= Mohamed Aden Tiiceey =

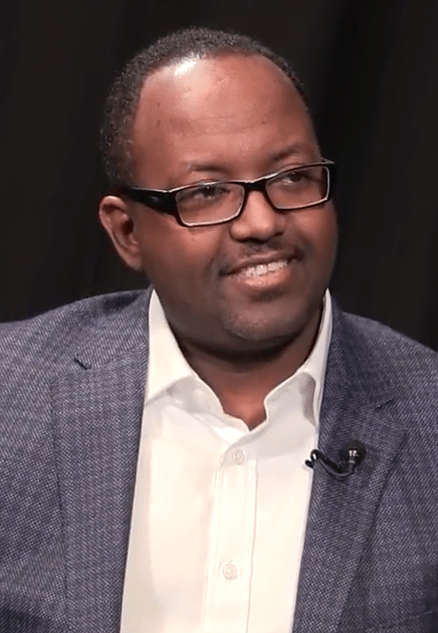
- Tiiceey in 2018

President of Himan and Heeb
- In office 12 June 2008 – 13 June 2013
- Preceded by: Office established
- Succeeded by: Abdullahi Ali Mohamed

Personal details
- Born: 1972 (age 53–54) Banaadir, Somali Democratic Republic
- Citizenship: Somali, American
- Spouse: Shamsa Aptidon
- Education: Ahmed Gurey Primary School; Yusuf Al-Kowneyn Secondary School; Minnesota State University, Mankato

Mohamed Abdullahi Moalim Adan (Somali: Maxamed Cabdullaaahi Aadan), commonly known as Mohamed Adan Tiiceey (Somali: Maxamed Aadan Tiiceey), is a Somali politician, founder and former president of the autonomous state, Himan and Heeb.

== Early life and education ==
Adan received his nickname "Tiiceey" in childhood.

Adan attended Ahmed Gurey Primary School, then Yusuf Al-Kowneyn Secondary School, where he graduated in 1989. While in school, he helped establish number of student and non-profit organizations including North American Somali Student Organization Umbrella to help his fellow students and the community.

At the age of 22, he immigrated to the United States. Adan resided in Minneapolis while running a small medical company. In 2005, he received his master's degree in public administration from Minnesota State University, Mankato. He worked as an election campaigner for the Democratic Party. Tiiceey became Deputy Chairman of the United Somali Diaspora, established in October 2007, before moving back to Somalia.

== Formation of Himan and Heeb ==
In March 2008, Tiiceey left the United States, with the support of the Somali diaspora, to form Himan and Heeb, an autonomous Habar Gidir-controlled regional administration located in the west of Galgadug and covering the South Central Somali Districts of Adado, Godinlabe, Bahdo, Gelinsor, Amara, El Hur, Harardhere, and Hobyo. Using some of the knowledge he gained from his education in public administration, he helped restore order in the state.

At the time, in an average, about 20 people were dying daily either from hostile or accidental gunfire. The people of the region lacked basic necessities. In response, Tiiceey, as Chairman and later President of Himan and Heb, worked to reconcile warring groups, build schools and clinics, dig wells, and establish a functioning government structure. In his tenure as the President of Himan and Heeb, he campaigned against both Al-Shabaab and local pirates. Tiiceey crusaded finding offshore solutions to the piracy problem in the region. Together with his administration, he persuaded many young people to leave these groups; at least 100 people did. Thanks to Tiiceey's formidable efforts, the people of Himan and Heeb and its surrounding regions enjoyed relative peace and stability.

Mohamed Aden Tiicey was credited with transforming Adado and its surrounding villages between 2008 and 2011 by promoting peace through instituting a functioning police force, establishing many new business enterprises, new schools, and new rules on self-governing structures that included Islamic courts, police stations, jails, legal checkpoints, municipal council's offices, and revenue collection centres. In 2010 and 2011, the president and his governing Council of Elders also rehabilitated the airstrip and the parliamentary buildings, which is still on-going through Diaspora funding. The President's standing and credibility among the communities was cemented as a result of the visible progress he is regarded as having driven forward.

In October 2009, when asked by the media about the booming and ever-growing phenomenon of Somali piracy, Tiiceey said:

I'd take these guys on, but I can't right now because I don't have the resources. Besides, you can't just wipe out a whole line of work for thousands of young men. If you take something away, you must replace it with something else. Otherwise, more problems.

However, Tiiceey also used his powerful position as a local politician and Saleban militia leader to enrich himself by assisting and facilitating the activities of local Saleban pirates as well as renowned pirate kingpin Mohamed Abdi Hassan. Moreover, it appears that Tiiceey's main assistance to the pirates was to facilitate the release of hostages, the payment of ransoms, and related negotiations. In some cases, Tiiceey extorted tens of thousands of dollars from aggrieved parties for granting permission to land a plane, which was usually about $200. Tiiceey is also suspected of providing the pirates with all the necessary funds and assistance to ensure uninterrupted communication and negotiations with representatives of the captured vessels.

In the spring of 2011, he visited Bush House, traveling to European countries. On 25 April 2018, Tiiceey visited the residence of President of Galmudug Ahmed Duale Gelle in Mogadishu. On 30 April, he visited Galkayo, the capital of the Mudug region, and was greeted by Galmudug officials, military personnel, and community members. On 1 May he arrived in Adado, the capital of Galmudug, and on 2 May he visited Adado general hospital, accompanied by former Vice President of Himan and Heb Abdirahman Shaatadde, Minister Omar Gureye, and Adado district сommissioner. They observed the operation of the hospital, which is the largest in Galmudug. Mohamed Omar greeted the officials and showed them how the hospital works. Tiiceey also visited the presidential palace of Galmudug. In the evening, an official ceremony was held for Tiiceey at SIMAD University in the city. As one of the members of the delegation, Tiiceey visited Dusmareb on 23 December 2019.

== Personal life ==
He married Shamso Abtidon 21 January 1993, and has six children: five sons and one daughter.

== Arrest ==
Mohamed Aden was arrested on 12 October 2013 year by the Belgian authorities, who accused him of helping the alleged leader of the pirates, Mohamed Abdi Hassan. According to the Somali media, the arrest was "the result of the Belgium authorities’ overreaction and lack of understanding of the power dynamics of this particular region of Somalia. Mr. Tiiceey ran this region politically and diplomatically but never had the military power to challenge or rid piracy from this region".

Friends and supporters of Tiiceey rejected his arrest, criticized the charges against him, and expressed their demand for his immediate release on social media, through petitions and television interviews, held several protest marches in Adado and Godinlabe, and held organized meetings in his hometown of Minneapolis. On 23 November, a rally was held in Adado to protest against the arrest of businessman Mohamed Abdi Hassan Afweyne and politician Mohamed Aden Tiiceey. The protest was broadcast over Somalia. Tiiceey's wife and a member of the Somali Habar Gidir clan, Shamsa Aptidon, appealed to the Somali-American Diaspora and the US government to intervene and demanded the immediate release of her husband. Members of the Hawiye clan, family, friends, and Iman Sheikh Hassan Mahmoud "Jamichi" of the Dawa Islamic Institute mosque in Saint Paul spoke at the "Minnesotans for Tiiceey" event.

During an interview on 7 June 2014 with a Somali website, the official representative of Himan and Heb, Arais Mohamed Haji, was asked to provide an update on the incarceration of Tiiceey and Afweyne in Belgium. He said:

The prominent and famous businessman from Himan and Heeb [Afweyne] and the former Himan and Heeb President [Tiiceey] are still held in detention in Belgium. They have not yet been tried for any crime and therefore remain innocent until proven guilty in a court of law. Since their detention, the Himan and Heeb regional government has spared no efforts, legally and diplomatically, to secure the release of the two men. We still call for their release. They are not criminals. If they had committed any crime, they would have already been proved guilty and convicted. We call for their release. They are highly respected elders and prominent politicians. They are illegally being held in detention. We still call for their release.

On 23 July 2015, Abdirahman Mohamed Hussein Odova, the Minister of Internal Affairs and Federalism of Somalia, called on the Galmudug leadership to work for the release of Tiiceey. Before his arrest, Mohamed Aden also encouraged young Somali Americans to help their homeland. In 2016, he was sentenced to five years in prison, and then was released early on 15 December 2017, returning to Minneapolis in the United States. Mohamed Aden Tiiceey was accused by the Belgian government of involvement in piracy, later pleading not guilty..

== See also ==
- Himan and Heeb
- Mohamed Abdi Hassan
