= Central Regions State =

- Capital and largest city: Dhusamareb
- Official languages: Somali

Autonomy Part of Federated Somalia
  - Declared: 2008
  - Recognition: Not recognized
- Currency: Somali shilling (SOS)
- Time zone: UTC+3 (EAT)
  - Summer (DST): UTC+3 (not observed)
- Calling code: 252 (Somalia)
- ISO 3166 code: SO
- Internet TLD: .so

Central Regions State was a prospective autonomous region in the Federal Republic of Somalia.

== Overview ==
On 30 July 2014, the Federal Government of Somalia officially endorsed a new Central Regions State, following a signed agreement in Mogadishu between representatives from the Galmudug and Himan and Heeb regional administrations, as well as Ahlu Sunna Waljama'a. The formalization ceremony for the new federal state was held at the Villa Somalia presidential compound and was presided over by President of Somalia Hassan Sheikh Mohamud and Prime Minister Abdiweli Sheikh Ahmed, with UN, EU, AU, IGAD and AMISOM envoys also in attendance. According to the Prime Minister's office, the Federal Government appointed a ministerial committee to guide the formation of the new state. It also organized a number of consultative meetings with the regional representatives, with each party eventually agreeing to establish a new administration in the Mudug and Galguduud regions. Additionally, the Central Regions State will be subject to the Provisional Federal Constitution.

On 9 August 2014, the UN, EU and IGAD envoys for Somalia reiterated that federal government representatives and signatories had indicated prior to the signing of the central state agreement that the pact would only apply to Galguduud and Galmudug. North Mudug would remain an integral part of Puntland state. On 24 August 2014, Federal Parliament Speaker Mohamed Osman Jawari announced that Federal MPs hailing from Puntland had begun brokering negotiations between the federal government and the Puntland regional administration.

On 14 October 2014, a three-day conference in Garowe concluded with a 12-point agreement between the Federal Government and Puntland authorities, which stipulates that the earlier Central Regions State pact between the Galmudug and Himan and Heeb regional administrations only applies to the Galguduud and south Mudug provinces.

On 25 December 2014, ahead of a state formation conference in Adado, the Federal Government appointed six committees to oversee the establishment of the prospective Central Somalia regional state. The steering bodies include a technical committee facilitating the creation of Central State, which is chaired by Halimo Ismail Ibrahim; a constitution committee, which is chaired by Abdinoor Moalim Mohamud; a reconciliation committee tasked with solving of differences and selection of delegates, which is chaired by Sheikh Omar Mohamud Mahad; a security, protocol and supervision committee, which is chaired by Uke Haji Abdirahman; a mobilization committee, which is chaired by Abdullahi Abdi Abdille; and a committee of accommodation of delegates and guests of honour, which is chaired by Dahir Hassan Guutaale.

On 21 January 2015, members of the technical committee for the establishment of a new Central State of Somalia arrived in Adado to facilitate the launching of an inauguration ceremony for the prospective regional state. The delegates were accompanied by elders and intellectuals, and subsequently held talks with Himan and Heeb administration officials and other local representatives.

In late March 2015, President Mohamud and Dhusamareb traditional elders began talks over a possible relocation of the Adado conference to Dhusamareb. Mohamud preferred holding the summit in Adado, whereas the traditional elders favored Dhusamareb for security-related reasons and because the town had already recently hosted smaller reconciliation meetings.

In April 2015, during consultative talks with local politicians and traditional elders, President Mohamud officially announced that Dhusamareb was slated to be the administrative capital of the Central State. On 16 April 2015, President Mohamud officially launched the Central State formation conference in Adado. The summit was attended by Federal Cabinet ministers and MPs, state formation technical committee Chairperson Halima Ismael, UN Special Envoy to Somalia Ambassador Nicholas Kay, IGAD Special Ambassador Mohamed Abdi Afey, Ambassador of Turkey Olgen Bakar and Uganda Special Envoy Nathan Mugisha. International representatives from the governments of Ethiopia, the United States, the United Kingdom, Italy and Sweden as well as AMISOM also welcomed the formation conference, and urged the local stakeholders to work together to ensure broad-based reconciliation, peacebuilding and statebuilding. According to Mohamud, traditional leaders are now tasked with selecting 510 delegates, who will then elect a new regional president within two weeks.

In May 2015, a federal delegation led by the Ministry of Interior launched the second phase of the Central State state formation conference in Adado. The meeting included talks with local politicians, elders and intellectuals as well as technical committee officials.
