= El Dhere =

El Dhere Ceeldheere
- Town
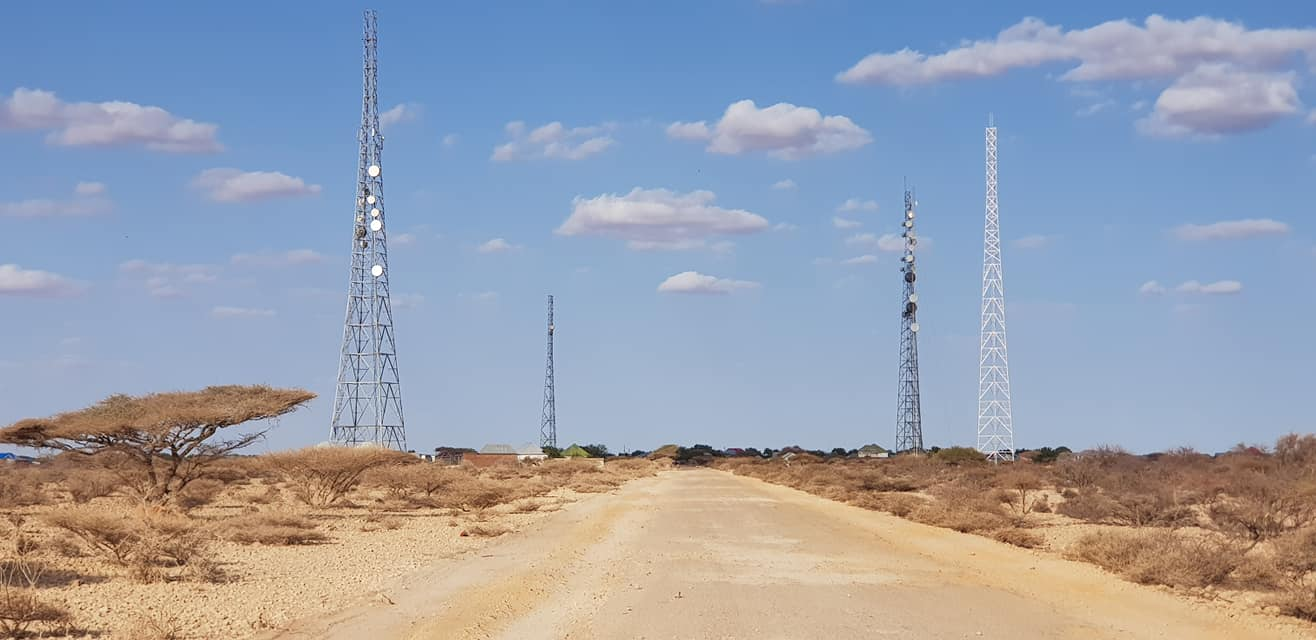
- El Dhere skyline

- Location in Central Somalia
- Coordinates: 5°22′06″N 46°11′28″E
- Country: Somalia
- State: Galmudug
- Region: Galguduud
- District: Dusmareb District

Government
  - Type: Mayor-Council-Commission
  - Mayor: Hudur Abdirahman

Population (2019)
  - Total: 50,000
- Time zone: UTC+3 (EAT)

El Dhere (Somali: Ceeldheere) is a town located in the Galguduud region of Galmudug state in central Somalia. It is to the south of Galmudug's state capital, Dusmareb.

== Location ==
El Dhere is located 30 km to the south of Dusmareb, the administrative and state capital of the Galguduud region and Galmudug state, and 40 km to the north of Guriceel, the commercial capital of the Galgaduud region.

During the 1982 Ethiopian invasion of Somalia, the Somali National Army command in El Dhere organized a counterattack to repulse an Ethiopian armor offensive that had pushed 11 km into Somalia.

== Demographics ==
As of 2019 the town has around 50,000 residents. As with most of Galmudug, it is primarily inhabited by Somalis from the Hiraab sub-clan of the Hawiye, particularly the Ayr [Ayaanle Cayr] sub-clan of Habar Gidir.

== Education ==
There are two primary and secondary schools that provide education in the town along with many Quranic schools. There is one privately owned university that provides undergraduate degrees.

== Transportation ==
Air travel in El Dhere is channeled through the nearby Guriel Airport.

== Hospitals ==
Several healthcare facilities exist in the town, though most of them are privately owned. There is only one public hospital.
