= Garad Yusuf Mohamud =

Somali politician (born 1988)

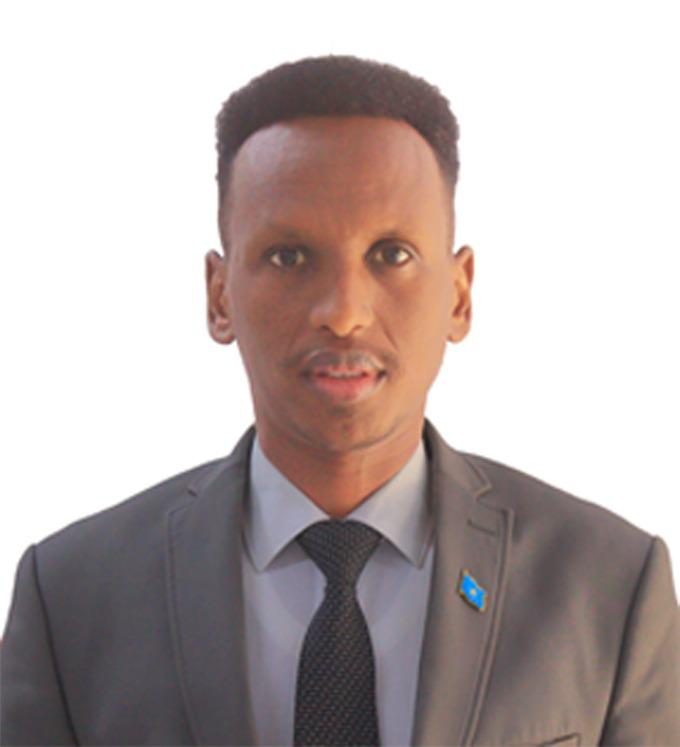
- Official Portrait, 2023

Minister of Fisheries and Marine Resources, Galmudug
- Incumbent
- Assumed office 5 December 2022
- Preceded by: Abdisabir Nur Shurie

Member of the Galmudug Parliament
- In office 22 June 2015 – 10 January 2020
- Preceded by: None
- Succeeded by: Abdirizak Mohamed Wehliye Ilkadahab

Personal details
- Born: 1988 (age 37–38) Galhareri District, Galmudug, Somalia
- Education: SIMAD University (P.A.); University for Peace (M.A.)

Garad Yusuf Mohamud (born 1988), also known as Garad Qowqabo, is a Somali politician who has served as the Minister of Fisheries and Marine Resources of Galmudug since December 2022 under Galmudug President Ahmed Abdi Karie. He previously served as member of Galmudug Parliament from 2015 until 2020.

== Early life ==
Mohamud was born in 1988 in Galhareri District, situated in the Galguduud region of Somalia. He is from the Habaridinle, Murusade sub-clan of the Hawiye.

== Education ==
He pursued his bachelor degree in Public Administration at SIMAD University in Somalia. Subsequently, he continued his education by earning a Master of Arts in Peace Governance and Development from the University for Peace (UPEACE).

== Career ==
Mohamud served as a member of the Galmudug Parliament from 2015 to 2020. Since December 2022, he has served as the Minister of Fisheries and Marine Resources of Galmudug.
