= Gadon, Somalia =

Gadon Gadoon
- village
- Location within Somalia
- Coordinates: 5°41′23″N 46°41′5″E
- Country: Somalia
- State: Galmudug
- Region: Galguduud
- District: Dusmareb
- Time zone: UTC+3 (EAT)

Gadon (Somali: Gadoon), is a village in the central Galguduud region of Somalia.

== Overview ==
Gadon is situated in the Dusmareb District of the Galmudug state of Somalia. The village is 40km east of the capital city of Galmudug state and the administrative capital of the galguduud region, Dusmareb.
