= Godinlabe District =

Godinlabe
- District
- Country: Somalia
- Region: Galgaduud
- Capital: Godinlabe
- Time zone: UTC+3 (EAT)

Godinlabe District (Somali: Degmada Godinlaba) is a district in the Galgaduud region of Galmudug state of Somalia. Its capital lies at Godinlabe.
