= 2021 Galmudug clashes =

Regional conflict in Somalia in 2021

- Part of Somali Civil War (2009–present)
- Location of Galmudug
Date	30 September - 23 October 2021
Location	Galmudug, Somalia
Status	Ceasefire

Belligerents
Somali Armed Forces	Ahlu Sunna Waljama'a

Commanders and leaders
	Omar Moʽallim Nur

Casualties and losses
16 (Government claim)	
- 120 killed (ASWJ claim)

In late October 2021, clashes occurred in Galmudug, Somalia between the Somali Army and Ahlu Sunna Waljama'a, a Sufi militia.

== Timeline ==
On 30 September 2021, Somali Armed Forces attacked the Ahlu Sunnah Wal Jama'a (ASWJ) fighters in Galmudug state. ASWJ took control of Mataban and Guriceel towns following the clashes. On 1 October 2021 ASWJ rebels took control of Guriel followed by Eldhere day later.

The clashes erupted on 23 October in the Guriel District. On 25 October, local government said that 16 soldiers had been killed. The ASWJ said the total death toll from the clashes is at least 120.

The ASWJ had been a government ally in fighting the civil war from 2010, but their previous arrangement broke down. The ASWJ first fought against the army in February 2020.
