= Mohamed Hashi Abdi =

Somalian politician (born 1972)

Mohamed Hashi Abdi Arabey محمد حاشي عبدي

Vice President of Galmudug
- In office 4 July 2015 – 2 February 2020
- President: Abdikarim Hussein Guled; Ahmed Duale Gelle
- Preceded by: Abdisamad Nuur Gulled
- Succeeded by: Ali Dahir Eid

President of Galmudug (acting)
- In office 26 February 2017 – 3 May 2017
- Preceded by: Abdikarim Hussein Guled
- Succeeded by: Ahmed Duale Gelle

Personal details
- Born: Beled Hawo, Gedo Somalia.

Mohamed Hashi Abdi Araby (Somali: Maxamad xaashi Cabdi Arabey, Arabic: محمد حاشي عبدي), also known as Mohamed Arabey, is a Somali politician born on 15 February 1972. He was the Vice President of Galmudug. He was elected on 4 July 2015, and served until 2 February 2020 and now is Director General, Ministry of Petroleum and mineral resources. Mohamed is from the Marehan, a sub-clan of the Darod clan. He is from Tayo party. He hails from Abudwak (Somali: Caabudwaaq) which is a town in the central Galgaduud province of Somalia. During his tenure, he also briefly assumed the role of acting President from February 26, 2017, to May 3, 2017, following the resignation of President Abdikarim Hussein Guled.

As Vice President, Arabey played a significant role in the administration of Galmudug, a federal member state in central Somalia. His leadership contributed to efforts aimed at stabilizing the region, promoting governance, and fostering development initiatives. His tenure was marked by endeavours to strengthen the state's institutions and enhance security, which are critical components for the progress of Galmudug.After completing his term as Vice President, Arabey transitioned to a national role and currently serves as the Director General of the Ministry of Petroleum and Mineral Resources of the Federal Government of Somalia. In this capacity, he is involved in overseeing the development and management of Somalia's petroleum and mineral resources, sectors that are vital for the country's economic growth and development.
