= Abdullahi Ali Mohamed =

Somali politician

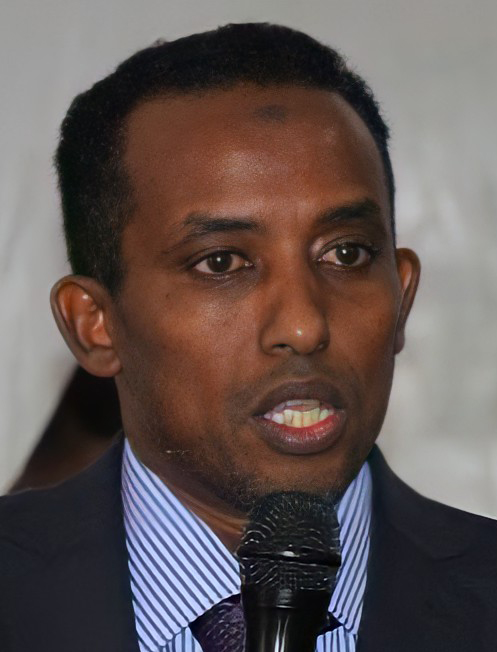

President of Himan and Heeb
- In office 13 June 2013 – 16 April 2015
- Preceded by: Mohamed Aden Tiiceey
- Succeeded by: Position abolished

Personal details
- Citizenship: Somali, British

Abdullahi Ali Mohamed (Barleh) (Somali: Cabdillaahi Cali Maxamed "Baarleex") is a Somali politician, second president of the unrecognized Himan and Heeb until the merger with Galmudug in 2015.

On 27 February 2017, he announced that he would run for President of Galmudug in the upcoming elections. Currently, Barleh is in the United Kingdom.

He has two known sons, Ayub Ali and Yaqub Ali, his other sons are unrecognised. Ayub and Yaqub currently go to a school in North London whilst living in Mill Hill.
