= List of presidents of Himan and Heeb =

President of the Himan and Heeb
- Coat of arms of Himan and Heeb

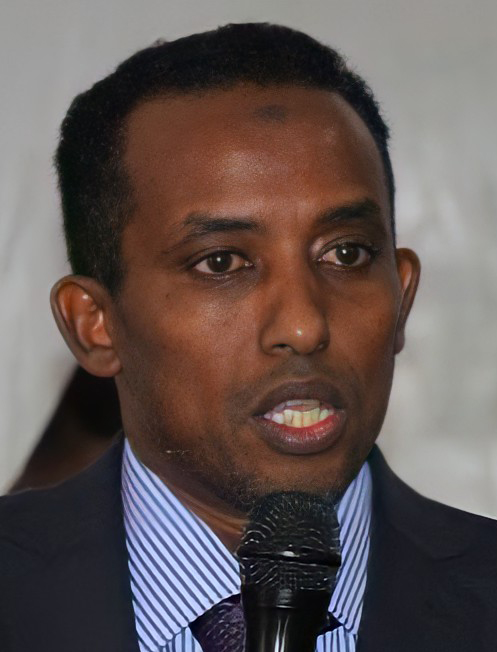
- Last officeholder Abdullahi Ali Mohamed; 13 June 2013 – 16 April 2015
- Seat: Adado
- Appointer: Himan and Heeb Administration
- Term length: Five years
- Formation: 12 June 2008
- First holder: Mohamed Aden Tiiceey
- Final holder: Abdullahi Ali Mohamed
- Abolished: 16 June 2015

This is a list of presidents of the Himan and Heeb, an autonomous region in Somalia. The President of Himan and Heeb was an executive head of state, also functioning as the head of administration (head of government). There is no prime minister.

The local administration's term is 5 years with the exception of the Council of Elders (Guurti); the Guurti has the power to re-appoint new or retain the old members of the administration. In early October 2010, the Council of Elders (Guurti) in Adado renewed the term of President Mohamed Adan Tiicey and his administration for another five years.

== List of officeholders ==
No.	Portrait	Name (Birth–Death)	Term of office			Political party
No.	Portrait	Name (Birth–Death)	Took office	Left office	Time in office	Political party
1		Mohamed Aden Tiiceey (1972—)	12 June 2008	13 June 2013	5 years, 1 day	Independent
2		Abdullahi Ali Mohamed (—)	13 June 2013	16 April 2015	1 year, 307 days	Independent

== See also ==
- List of presidents of Somalia
- List of presidents of Galmudug
- List of presidents of Hirshabelle
- Lists of office-holders
