= Mohamed Abdi Hassan =

Somali pirate kingpin

Mohamed Abdi Hassan محمد عبدي حسن
- Born: Harardhere, Somalia
- Occupations: kidnapper, pirate leader
- Children: Abdiqaadir

Mohamed Abdi Hassan (Somali: Maxamed Cabdi Xasan, Arabic: محمد عبدي حسن), commonly known as Afweyne, is a convicted Somali pirate leader. He founded the Hobyo-Harardhere Piracy Network in 2005 and rapidly grew to become one of Somalia's preeminent pirates. In 2012 he began to leave the piracy "industry" and diversified his holdings into a multinational business empire. Hassan was arrested that year in Malaysia but was released as he had managed to obtain diplomatic immunity from Mogadishu. Finally, in 2013 Hassan was lured to Belgium and sentenced in 2016 to twenty years' imprisonment for his many crimes.

== Personal life ==
Nicknamed "Afweyne" ("Big Mouth" in Somali), Hassan is from Harardhere, a port town in the south-central Galmudug region of Somalia. He hails from the Habar Gidir sub-clan of the Hawiye. Hassan has a son, Abdiqaadir, who works closely with him in his business operations.

== Career ==
=== General ===
Hassan began his career in piracy in 2005. According to Belgian authorities, he made millions in illegal activities over the next eight years.

The UN Monitoring Group on Somalia and Eritrea linked Hassan with over seven vessel hijackings in 2009. Secondary reports alleged that he was also involved in the capture of dozens of other ships, among which were the MV Sirius Star supertanker and the Ukrainian tank-laden MV Faina in 2008. At his height, Hassan enjoyed a cult following. The late Libyan Colonel Muammar Gaddafi, who hailed him as a national hero, also invited Hassan to the four-day celebration of the 40th anniversary of the Libyan Revolution in 2009.

In 2010 Al-Shabaab militants began encroaching on Hassan's pirate strongholds of Harardhere and Hobyo. He subsequently entered into a formal agreement with the insurgents, agreeing to hand over a US$100,000 tax per hijacking ransom in return for no interference in his operations. Hassan indicated in an interview with the Spanish daily newspaper ABC that there was "no political relationship, only one based on money", adding that he was paying 5 percent of his ransom profits as a security fee. He later denied all involvement with the militant group. However, Hassan's son asserted in April 2012 that the partnership with the outfit was still extant.

In 2010 Hassan received an official pardon from Mohamed Aden ("Tiiceey"), who was at the time the governor of Somalia's south-central Himan and Heeb region. Hassan concurrently handed over management of his piracy operations to his son Abdiqaadir so that he could then focus exclusively on managing his multi-national business empire. He subsequently began to diversify his investments in an effort to minimize risk. A 2011 UN report asserted that Hassan had used his ransom profits to purchase the drug khat in Kenya for later resale to pirates in Harardhere and elsewhere along Somalia's coast.

In 2012 a leaked UN report alleged that Hassan was "one of the most notorious and influential leaders of the Hobyo-Harardhere Piracy Network", an area in the autonomous Himan & Heeb region in south-central Somalia. According to federal prosecutor Johan Delmulle, Hassan was specifically "responsible for the hijacking of dozens of commercial vessels from 2008 to 2013."

In April 2012 Malaysian authorities captured Hassan. He was later released when a document from Somalia's then transitional government was received. A former president had reportedly given Hassan diplomatic status and a diplomatic passport as an incentive to quit the piracy business.

Later the same year, Belgium and Seychelles issued an INTERPOL Red Notice for Hassan's arrest.

In January 2013 Hassan announced in the south-central town of Adado that he had renounced crime, retiring from the piracy business. He also asserted that he had succeeded in getting many of his colleagues to follow suit. According to Mohamed Adan, chief of the local Adado administration, municipal officials were successful in persuading Hassan and other pirate commanders to disarm, as the bosses had come to the realization that they could no longer function with impunity and profits had dropped.

Following the establishment of a new federal government in Somalia, Hassan embarked on negotiations for an agreement on a national amnesty and rehabilitation program for pirates. A series of meetings brokered by Tiiceey were then held between senior officials with the Somali Federal Government and top commanders of the Hobyo-Harardhere Piracy Network. Hassan simultaneously established the Anti-Piracy Agency in Mogadishu and sought government and international funding for an initiative that envisioned the creation of rehabilitation, skills-training camps for reformed pirates. Additionally, Hassan and his son attempted to negotiate a Grand Bargain, wherein all of the remaining captives held by the Hobyo-Harardhere Network would be released in exchange for a reported $2 million payment from the Somali federal authorities. The deal fell apart after internal disagreement and funds misappropriation, which ended in the death of a pirate negotiator.

=== Arrest ===
In October 2013 Hassan was arrested in Belgium for having allegedly masterminded the 2009 hijacking of the Belgian dredge vessel Pompei. He was also charged with abducting the ship's crew and belonging to a criminal organization.

Through his associate Tiiceey, Hassan had been invited to participate as a consultant on a documentary about his piratical exploits. After months of talks, Hassan and Tiiceey flew to Brussels to take part in what they believed was a film project. The documentary turned out to be part of a sting operation by Belgian undercover agents, which had been set up after prosecutors resolved to try the masterminds behind the 2009 Pompei hijacking along with the convicted hijackers. According to prosecutors it took months to lure Afweyne into coming to Brussels, though they did not elaborate on how exactly the plot was executed. Belgian undercover agents were enlisted after prosecutors determined that an international arrest warrant would not be effective in apprehending the men.

Along with Tiiceey, Hassan was tried in Bruges, and sentenced in March 2016 to twenty years' imprisonment for leading the 2009 hijacking of the Pompei. He is the first pirate leader to be prosecuted by the international community. Due to a legal technicality, no attempt was made to confiscate any of his millions gained by piracy. Tiiceey received only 5 years and was acquitted from charges focused on the Pompei.
