= Ahmed Duale Gelle =

Somali politician (born 1949)

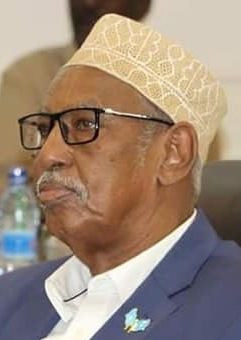

5th President of Galmudug
- In office 3 May 2017 – 2 February 2020
- Vice President: Mohamed Hashi Abdi
- Preceded by: Abdikarim Hussein Guled
- Succeeded by: Ahmed Abdi Karie

Personal details
- Born: 8 July 1949 (age 77) Galkayo, Mudug, Somalia

Ahmed Duale Gelle (Somali: Axmed Ducaale Geele; born 8 July 1949) was the 5th president of Galmudug State of Somalia, in office from 3 May 2017 to 2 February 2020. Before he became Galmudug’s president he was a businessman and former federal parliament member.

== Background ==
=== Personal life ===
Gelle was born in 1945 in the city of Galkayo, situated in the Mudug, region of Somalia and hails from the Abdalle Sacad subclan of Habar Gidir. Gelle stands from the Habar Gidir Hawiye clan

=== Education ===
Gelle graduated from Somali National University in Mogadishu, Somalia with Bachelor of Arts in Economics in between 1960-1970.

== President of Galmudug ==
=== Inauguration ===
May 29, 2017, Galmudug's president is officially inaugurated into office at a ceremony in the state capital Adado. The event was attended by the president of the Federal Republic of Somalia, Mohamed Abdullahi Mohamed, Jubaland president Ahmed Mohamed Islam (Madobe), Puntland president Abdiweli Mohamed Ali, South West State of Somalia president Sharif Hassan Sheikh Aden, Hirshabelle vice president Cali Cabdulaahi Xuseen (Guudlaawe), governor of Banadir region, UN Special Representative for Somalia Michael Keating, Federal MP's, representatives from Turkey, Djibouti, U.S., EU, AU, Ethiopia and IGAD. It was also attended by Galmudug's public and members of the Somali expatriate community.

Representatives of the international community urged Gelle to hold meetings with Ahlu Sunna Waljama'a (a Galmudug-based paramilitary group consisting of moderate Sufis opposed to Islamist groups such as Al-Shabaab) although reconciliation meetings were held before Galmudug's election and despite the first round of talks being successful, it was curtailed by the presidential campaign of Galmudug State. Gelle promised to find solutions and hold meetings with Ahlu Sunna Waljama'a and he also promised to find solutions for Galkayo conflicts between Puntland and Galmudug before he selects his cabinet.

== See also ==
- Politics of Somalia
- Lists of office-holders
