= Battle of Wabho =

2009 one day battle in Galguduud, Somalia

Battle of Wabho (2009)
- Part of Somali Civil War, Somali Civil War (2009–present), Battle for Central Somalia (2009)
Date	June 5, 2009
Location	Wabho, Galgudug, Somalia
Result	ASWJ victory

Belligerents
Hizbul Islam; Al-Shabaab	Ahlu Sunna Waljama'a

Commanders and leaders
Hassan Dahir Aweys; Hassan Turki; Hassan Mahdi; Muse Abdi Arale; Ali "Dheere" Mohamud	Sheikh Abu Yusuf; Sharif Ali Ahmed; Aden Abdi Nur

Strength
Unknown	Unknown

Casualties and losses
24+ killed	31+ killed
- Total Casualties: 123 killed, 60+ injured

The Battle of Wabho was a one-day-long battle fought between the Ahlu Sunna Waljama'a militia loyal to the Somali government and Islamist insurgent groups Hizbul Islam and al-Shabaab over the district of Wabho (also known as Wabxo), located in Central Somalia. According to Mahmutcan Ateş, more than 123 people were killed as a result of the battle, making it one of the bloodiest battles in the Somali Civil War.

== Prelude ==
On May 15, when the Battle for Central Somalia was just beginning with an insurgent offensive, Al-Shabaab mujahedeen attacked the town of Wabho. For two days they fought for the city with Ahlu Sunna Waljama'a. 5 were killed in the fighting however the takeover had failed and pro-government militants remained in control of the town.

== The battle ==
On June 5 the fighting started when mujahedeen attacked the town again, this time with Hizbul Islam as their main force. Hizbul Islam spokesman Sheik Muse Abdi Arale reported that they had won and captured the town as well as 3 armoured trucks. At this time only 10 had been reported, dead. Residents reported the two sides used heavy weapons, also mortars had been used as Muse Arale was quoted saying "We have pounded mortars on the infidels and entered the town from all sides". 56 were reported dead, however Ahlu Sunnah Wal Jama claimed they re-took the town. As both sides claimed victory it was unknown who was in control of the town and no-one could independently verify this. The death toll was said to be over 40, with 60 injured.

On June 7 there was finally confirmation that allied Hizbul Islam and al-Shabaab, mujahedeen had won the battle. Muse Arale was quoted as saying: "The Mujahideen won the battle and we captured three armed trucks and there were many casualties on both sides" and Sheikh Ali "Dheere" Mohamud, the spokesman of al-Shabaab said that "Ahlu Sunnah Wal Jamee'a militia lost the battle and an important town." Local residents also confirmed it and Ahlu Sunnah militia commanders refused to comment. It was also reported that al-Shabaab used foreign fighters, some of which were among the Shuhada (martyrs).

Per these reports, 31 Ahlu Sunna Waljama'a fighters and 24 mujahedeen had been killed in the battle. At least 9 civilians had been killed during the clashes.

== Sheikh Hassan Dahir Aweys and Hassan Turki ==
On June 7, Ahlu Sunna Waljama'a commander Aden Abdi Nur claimed they had killed Sheikh Hassan Dahir Aweys during the fighting as there were some reports he was sighting near the town. He insisted they had shot him in the head. However Shiekh Aweys contacted the media to prove he wasn't dead, he claimed to be in perfect health. After this confirmation, deputy information secretary Sharif Ali Ahmed claimed they had injured Sheikh Hassan Dahir Aweys and killed Sheikh Hassan Abdullah Hersi al-Turki during the fighting in Wabho. But the spokesman of Hizbul Islam, Sheik Hassan Mahdi denied these claims. He also said that Sheikh Aweys was in Mogadishu and thus could not have been injured in the fighting.

Sheikh Aweys resurfaced on June 8 to dispel claims of being injured or wounded. He held a press-conference in Mogadishu where he called the claims of being killed/injured: "enemy propaganda". He was quoted as saying: "News of my death is unfounded, every person is destined to die, but it will come the day sanctioned by Allah."

== See also ==
- List of wars: 2003–present
