= Mohamed Ahmed Alin =

Somali politician (1951–2023)

Mohamed Ahmed Alin محمد أحمد علين
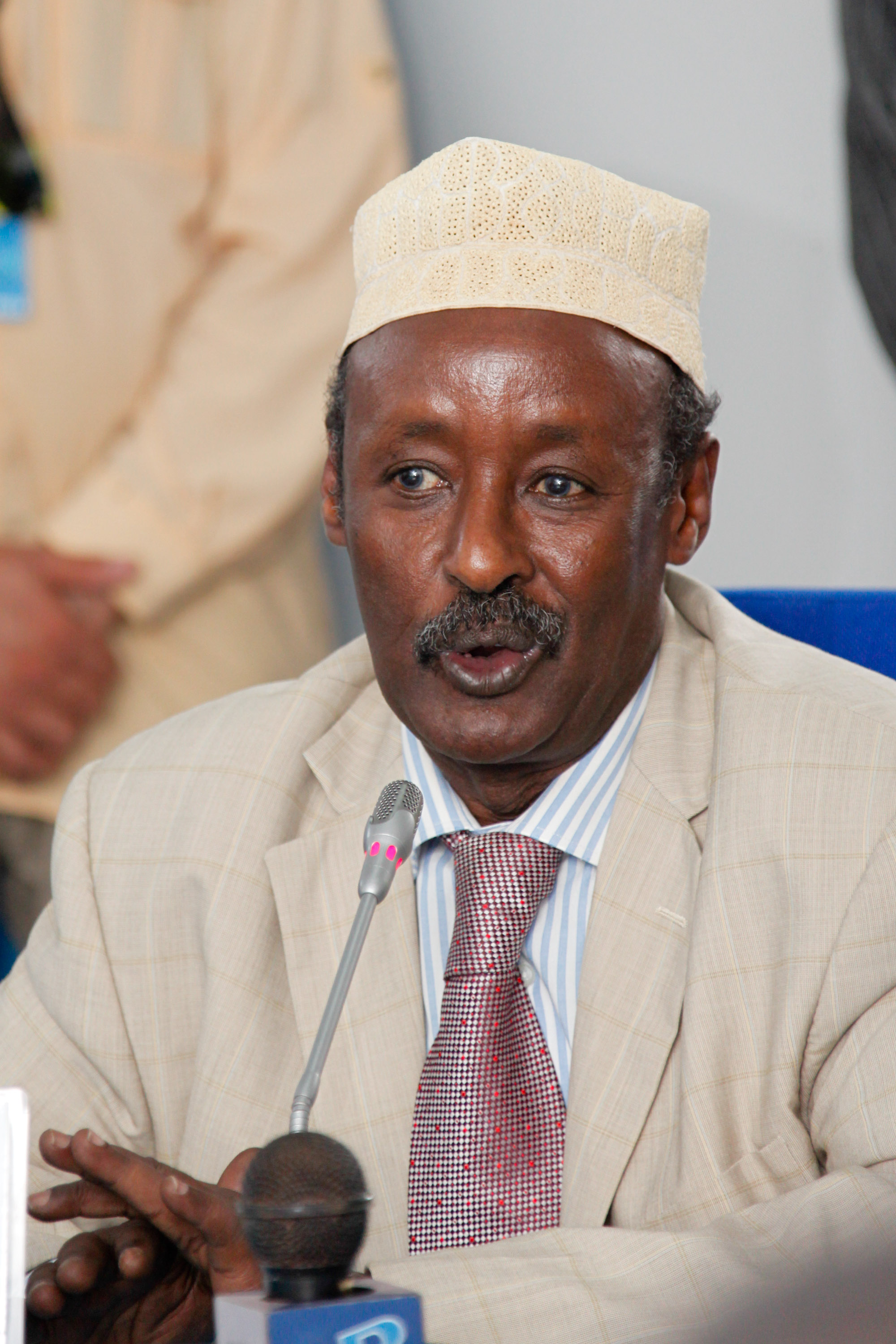
- Alin in 2011

2nd President of Galmudug
- In office 14 August 2009 – 1 August 2012
- Vice President: Abdisaman Nur
- Preceded by: Mohamed Warsame Ali
- Succeeded by: Abdi Hasan Awale Qeybdiid

Personal details
- Born: 20 October 1951 Mogadishu, Somalia
- Died: 31 October 2023 (aged 72) London, UK
- Party: Independent

Mohamed Ahmed Alin (Somali: Maxamed Axmed Aliin, Arabic: محمد أحمد علين; 20 October 1951 – 31 October 2023) was a Somali politician and military leader who served as president of the semi-autonomous Galmudug State of Somalia.

== Biography ==
Alin was a colonel in the former Somali Military. He later entered a career in politics, participating in the regional elections of the Galmudug state in central Somalia. The elections took place in Galkacyo, the capital of Galmudug, and Alin came out victorious, making him the second president of the region. Sultans and religious leaders were also reportedly on hand to congratulate him on his election victory. Alin's term as President of Galmudug was scheduled for three years. Alin died from a stroke on 31 October 2023, at the age of 72.
