= Sheikh Mohamed Shakir =

Somali politician (born 1974)

Mohamed Ali Hassan محمد علي حسن
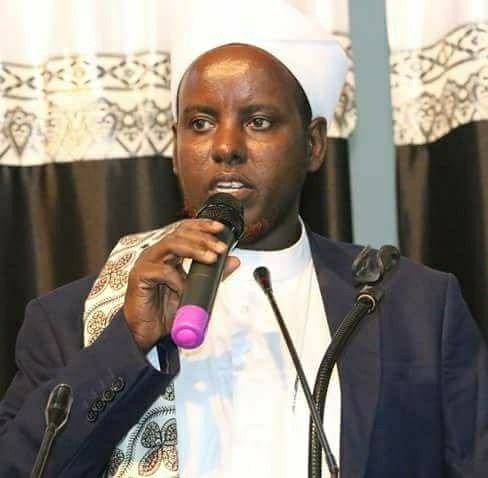

Chief Minister of Galmudug
- In office 6 December 2017 – 2 February 2020
- Succeeded by: Ahmed Abdi Kariye

Personal details
- Born: July 24, 1974 (age 52) Dhusamareb, Somalia

Sheikh Mohamed Shakir Ali Hassan (Somali: Maxamad Cali Xasan, Arabic: محمد علي حسن) is the former Chief Minister of Galmudug in Somalia. He was appointed on 6 December 2017 after a powersharing deal between Galmudug and Ahlu Sunna Waljama'a.

The Chief Minister presided over the state cabinet sessions but did not have the power to appoint or sack ministers. The President appointed the state ministers then forwarded it to the chief minister who then presented the names to the state assembly. The agreement also gave the president powers to sack the chief minister.

== See also ==
- Somalia
- Politics of Somalia
- Lists of office-holders
- List of current heads of state and government
