= Godinlabe =

Godinlabe Godinlaba
- Town
- Location in Somalia
- Coordinates: 5°52′46″N 46°37′51″E
- Country: Somalia
- State: Galmudug
- Region: Galguduud

Government
  - Type: District Council

Population (2014)
  - Total: 50,000
- Time zone: UTC+3 (EAT)

Godinlabe (Somali: Godinlaba, is a town in the Galgaduud region of Galmudug State of Somalia.

== Geography ==
It's 558 km from the capital city of Somalia, Mogadishu, and 48 km from the capital of the Galgaduud region, Dhusamareb

== Demographics ==
Godinlabe has a population around 50,000 inhabitants. The city is primarily inhabited by people from the Somali ethnic group, with the Habar Gidir well-represented.

== Climate ==
Godinlabe has a hot, arid climate. The weather is generally hot, sunny and dry. As other Somali regions, it has two rainy seasons and two dry seasons, each of three months.

== Economy ==
Godinlabe has a really good economy, one of the best in the region. It has a Coca-Cola, mineral bottled water, Sprite, 7-up, and Fanta manufacturing plant, it's supplied to many towns/cities in the region and also markets in Godinlabe.

Godinlabe has an Animal trading market; there is a huge market in the city where many types of things are sold, and Godinlabe has many types of livestock, such as Camels, Cows and goats, which is shipped to Gulf states from coastal towns/cities in the region.
