= Chief minister =

Title for the head of government of some countries' administrative divisions

A chief minister is an elected or appointed head of government of – in most instances – a sub-national entity, for instance an administrative subdivision or federal constituent entity. Examples include a state (and sometimes a union territory) in India; a territory of Australia; a province of Sri Lanka or Pakistan; a federal province in Nepal; an autonomous region of the Philippines; or a British Overseas Territory that has attained self-governance. It is also used as the English version of the title given to the heads of governments of the Malay states without a monarchy.

The title is also used in the Crown Dependencies of the Isle of Man (since 1986), in Guernsey (since 2004), and in Jersey (since 2005).

In 2018, Sierra Leone, a presidential republic, created the role of an appointed chief minister, which is similar to a prime minister in a semi-presidential system. Before that, only Milton Margai had the same position between 1954 and 1958.

== Origin ==
It was used throughout history in various forms but most notable is the Grand vizier. The vizier was originally known as "wazir" and was used for the first as prime minister or chief minister role in Abbasid Caliphate later it was adopted by various sultanates and empires like Ottoman Empire.

== Meaning and role ==
The title has a similar construction and role as a first minister or minister-president but usually with a lower rank. The role has context within the Westminster system of government where a constitutional head of state (usually sub-national) is advised by ministers who usually head executive government departments (ministries). A chief minister is understood to be "first among equals". They would be the chief adviser to the nominal head of their state, the chair of cabinet and leader of the main governing political party in the legislature.

== Chief ministers around the world ==
- Chief Minister of the Australian Capital Territory
- Chief Minister of the Northern Territory of Australia
- Chief Minister of Burma
- Chief Minister of Guernsey
- Chief Minister of Gibraltar
- Chief Minister of India
- Chief Minister of Jersey
- Chief Minister of the Isle of Man
- Chief Minister of Montserrat
- Chief Ministers in Malaysia
- Chief minister (Nepal)
- Chief Minister (Pakistan)
- Chief Minister of Bangsamoro of the Philippines
- Chief Minister of Saint Helena
- Chief Minister of Sierra Leone
- Chief Minister of Singapore
- Chief Ministers in Sri Lanka
- Chief Minister of Mandalay Region
- List of chief ministers of Galmudug (Somalia)

== Informal chief ministers ==
- Chief minister of France
- English chief ministers

== See also ==
- Constitutional monarchy
- Governor
- Parliamentary leader
