= Mohamed Warsame Ali =

Somalian politician (1937–2019)

1st President of Galmudug
- In office 14 August 2006 – 14 August 2009
- Vice President: Abdisalam Haji Ahmed Liban
- Succeeded by: Mohamed Ahmed Alin

Personal details
- Born: 1937
- Died: May 6, 2019 (aged 81–82) Nairobi, Kenya
- Party: Independent

Mohamed Warsame Ali "Kiimiko" (Somali: Maxamed Warsame Cali "Kiimiko"; 1937 – 6 May 2019) was the founder and the first president of Galmudug state, elected on 14 August 2006, when Galmudug state was established. Ali was a Somali politician and diplomat. He has occupied various diplomatic posts in Somalia since independence in 1960, including Somali Ambassador to the United States in 1980. He died on May 6, 2019, at the age of 81–82.

== Transitional Federal Government ==
Under the Transitional Federal Government, Warsame held a number of posts, including Minister of Commerce in 2000, Minister of Public Works in 2003, and Minister of Sports & Youth Affairs in early 2006. On 14 August 2006, Warsame was elected president of the newly formed autonomous state of Galmudug in central Somalia by representatives of the people of Mudug and Galgaduud.
