= Gadon =

Gadon is a surname. Notable people with the surname include:

- Elinor Gadon (1925–2018), American cultural historian
- Larry Gadon (born 1958), Filipino lawyer and politician
- Sarah Gadon (born 1987), Canadian actress

== See also ==
- Gadon, Somalia, village
