= Abdi Hasan Awale =

Somali politician (born 1948)

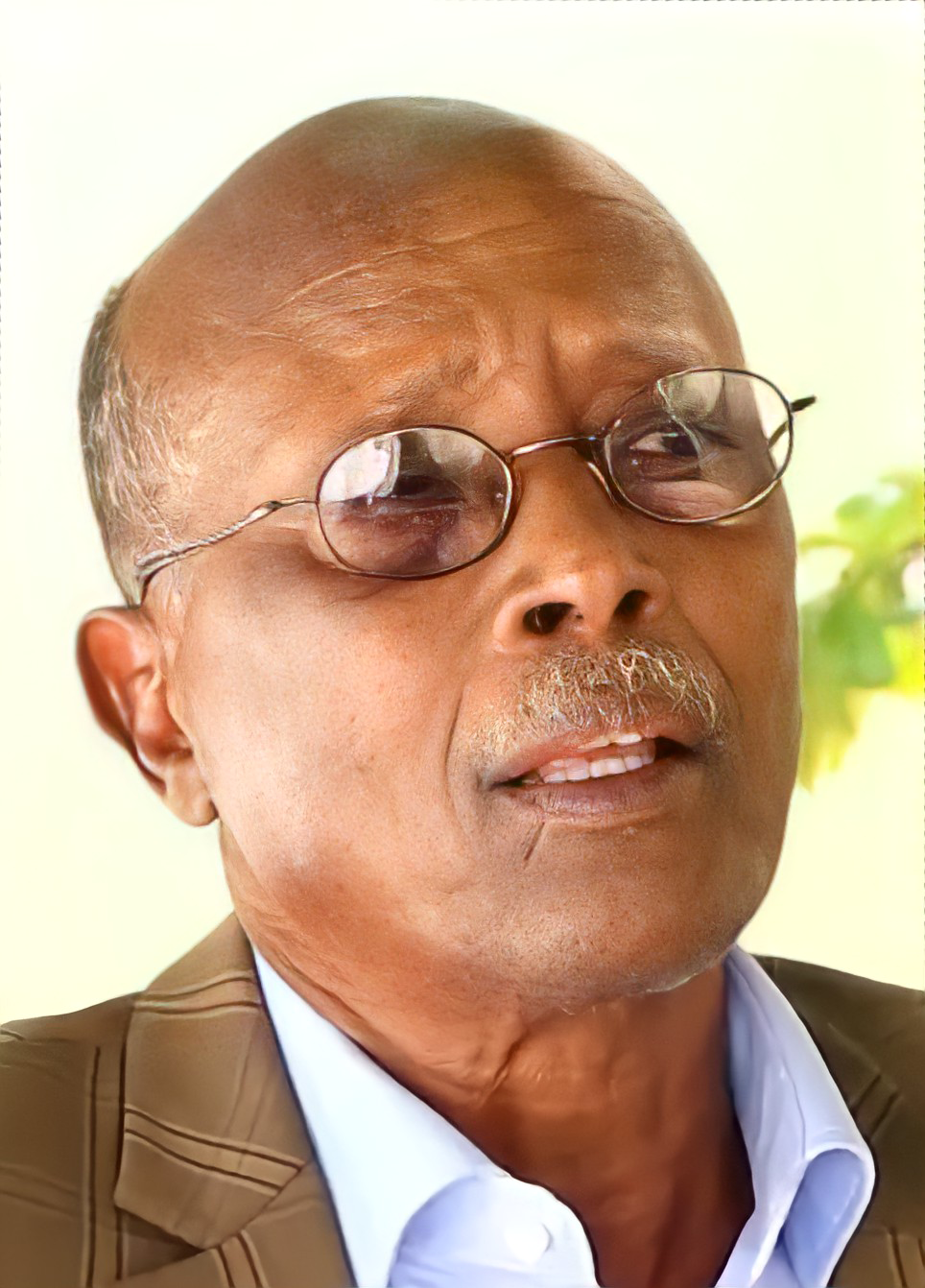
- Awale in 2019

3rd President of Galmudug
- In office 1 August 2012 – 23 July 2015
- Vice President: Abdisamad Nuur Gulled
- Preceded by: Mohamed Ahmed Alin
- Succeeded by: Abdikarim Hussein Guled

Chief of police of Mogadishu
- In office 12 November 2001 – 8 December 2003
- Prime Minister: Hassan Abshir Farah

Personal details
- Born: 1948 (age 77–78)
- Party: Independent

Abdi Hasan Awale or Abdi Qeybdiid (Somali: Cabdi Xasan Cawaale (Qeybdiid), Arabic: عبدي حسن عوالي قيبديد; born 1948) is a Somali politician.

Qeybdiid was a high ranking member of the Somali National Alliance during the 1990s. His home hosted the 12 July 1993 conference that was the target of the Bloody Monday raid. He later served as police chief for both the national and the Mogadishu forces. During the mid-2000s he was a leading figure in the CIA backed Somali Warlord Alliance fighting the Islamic Courts, transitioning during the Ethiopian military occupation the following year to Commissioner of Police for the Transitional Federal Government.

In 2012, he was elected President of Galmudug state, holding office until 2015.

== Personal life ==
Abdi Hasan Awale was born in 1948 in Galkacyo, Somalia. He is a member of the Sacad sub-clan of the Habar Gedir clans.

== Political career ==
Abdi Hasan Awale rose to prominence as Mohammed Farrah Aidid's interior minister in its clashes with UN forces during the so-called "nation-building" phase of UNOSOM II in 1993.

By 2001, he was the chief of police over Mogadishu as part of the new Transitional National Government (TNG).

In 2006, he fought with the Alliance for the Restoration of Peace and Counter-Terrorism (ARPCT) against the Islamic Courts Union in the Second Battle of Mogadishu. They surrendered on 11 July 2006, the last Alliance forces to do so.

He defected from the alliance in June 2006, saying, "Since the formation of ARPCT, Mogadishu has been a centre of a military crisis that has led to the needless death of hundreds of people, therefore I decide to quit the alliance to build on the gains of the Islamic tribunals and give peace a chance". In December 2006, he led an engagement on behalf of the Transitional Federal Government (TFG), backed by a sizable contingent of Ethiopian troops, known as the Battle of Bandiradley. He is also the "Tiger Abdi" of the 12 July 1993 Abdi House Raid, which presaged the First Battle of Mogadishu. On 1 January 2007, he returned to Mogadishu where he pleaded for there to be no reprisals against the defeated Islamists.

He was elected on 1 August 2012 as the new president of Galmudug state, a semi-autonomous region in Somalia.
