= Himan and Heeb =

2008–2015 autonomous region in central Somalia

Himan and Heeb State Dawladda Ximan iyo Xeeb
- Flag Coat of arms
- Anthem: Qolobaa Calankeed
- Capital and largest city: Adado
- Official languages: Somali
- Demonyms: Hemanian, Hemani

Government
  - President: Abdullahi Ali Mohamed
  - Vice President: Abdirihman Shaaticadde

Autonomy (part of federated Somalia)
  - Declared: 2008
  - Dissolved: 2015

Area
  - Total: 129,852 km^{2} (50,136 sq mi)
  - Water (%): 43.9

Population
  - 2014 estimate: 811,918
  - 2012 census: 780,000
  - Density: 85/sq mi (32.8/km^{2})
- GDP (PPP): 2014 estimate
  - Total: $28 Million
- Currency: Somali shilling (SOS)
- Time zone: UTC+3 (EAT)
  - Summer (DST): UTC+3
- Calling code: 252 (Somalia)
- ISO 3166 code: XX.SO
- Internet TLD: .so
- Today part of: Somalia: Galmudug

Himan and Heeb (Somali: Ximan iyo Xeeb; sometimes spelled Ximan and Xeeb) was an autonomous region in the Federal Republic of Somalia. Formed in 2008, its capital was the central town of Adado (Cadaado). In 2015 Himan and Heeb merged with Galmudug to form a much larger Galmudug which consists of Mudug and Galguduud regions.

== Overview ==
Formed in 2008 by the Somali diaspora, Mohamed Aden Tiiceey was the first elected president of Himan & Heeb.

In June 2013, Abdullahi Ali Mohamed (Barleh) was elected President of the Himan and Heeb administration.

In January 2014, Barleh announced that his administration had temporarily severed ties with the federal government on the grounds that the central authorities had not done enough to serve the interests of the region's residents. However, he indicated that his administration was prepared to engage in discussions with the federal government in the name of national unity provided that the central authorities addressed the requirements of his constituents.

On 29 January 2014, delegations from Himan and Heeb and the Galmudug administration met in Galkayo for the first phase of a series of discussions regarding the possible unification of the two territories. The potential merger would consist of all of the administrations in central Somalia, including the part of Galguduud administered by the moderate Ahlu Sunna Waljama'a Sufi group. The initiative is intended to meet the national constitution's stipulation that "two or more regions can join to form a federal state," and thereby qualify the unified territory for full Federal Member State status under the Federal Government.

On 30 July 2014, the Federal Government of Somalia officially endorsed a new Central Regions State, following a signed agreement in Mogadishu between representatives from Galmudug, Himan and Heeb, and Ahlu Sunna Waljama'a. The formalization ceremony for the new federal state was held at the Villa Somalia presidential compound and was presided over by President of Somalia Hassan Sheikh Mohamud and Prime Minister Abdiweli Sheikh Ahmed, with UN, EU, AU, IGAD and AMISOM envoys also in attendance. According to the Prime Minister's office, the Federal Government appointed a ministerial committee to guide the formation of the new state. It also organized a number of consultative meetings with the regional representatives, with each party eventually agreeing to establish a new administration in the Mudug and Galguduud regions. Additionally, the Central Regions State will be subject to the Provisional Federal Constitution.

On 31 July 2014, the autonomous Puntland regional administration in northeastern Somalia issued a statement rejecting the Central Regions State agreement on the grounds that it contravened certain clauses and articles in the Provisional Federal Constitution and breached Puntland's jurisdiction over the northern part of the Mudug province. The Puntland Council of Ministers led by Puntland President Abdiweli Mohamed Ali further expressed dismay over sponsorship of and attendance during the agreement by representatives of the central government and the international community, respectively. It also suspended relations with the Mogadishu authorities, and recalled Puntland's representatives serving in the Federal Parliament, Federal Cabinet and Federal Constitutional Review Committee to the Puntland state capital of Garowe for consultations.

On 9 August 2014, the UN, EU and IGAD envoys for Somalia issued a joint statement assuring the Puntland administration that the new central state of Somalia would not include any territory under Puntland jurisdiction. According to the officials, federal government representatives and signatories had indicated prior to the signing of the central state agreement that the pact would only apply to Galguduud and Galmudug, while North Mudug would remain an integral part of Puntland state. On 24 August 2014, Federal Parliament Speaker Mohamed Osman Jawari announced that Federal MPs hailing from Puntland had begun brokering negotiations between the federal government and the Puntland regional administration.

On 14 October 2014, a three-day conference in Garowe concluded with a 12-point agreement between the Federal Government and Puntland authorities, which stipulates that the earlier Central Regions State pact between the Galmudug and Himan and Heeb regional administrations only applies to the Galguduud and south Mudug provinces.

On 25 December 2014, ahead of a state formation conference in Adado, the Federal Government appointed six committees to oversee the establishment of the prospective Central Somalia regional state. The steering bodies include a technical committee facilitating the creation of Central State, which is chaired by Halimo Ismail Ibrahim; a constitution committee, which is chaired by Abdinoor Moalim Mohamud; a reconciliation committee tasked with solving of differences and selection of delegates, which is chaired by Sheikh Omar Mohamud Mahad; a security, protocol and supervision committee, which is chaired by Uke Haji Abdirahman; a mobilization committee, which is chaired by Abdullahi Abdi Abdille; and a committee of accommodation of delegates and guests of honour, which is chaired by Dahir Hassan Guutaale.

On 21 January 2015, members of the technical committee for the establishment of a new Central State of Somalia arrived in Adado to facilitate the launching of an inauguration ceremony for the prospective regional state. The delegates were accompanied by elders and intellectuals, and subsequently held talks with Himan and Heeb administration officials and other local representatives.

In late March 2015, President Mohamud and Dhusamareb traditional elders began talks over a possible relocation of the Adado conference to Dhusamareb. Mohamud preferred holding the summit in Adado, whereas the traditional elders favored Dhusamareb for security-related reasons and because the town had already recently hosted smaller reconciliation meetings.

In April 2015, during consultative talks with local politicians and traditional elders, President Mohamud officially announced that Dhusamareb was slated to be the administrative capital of the Central State. On 16 April, President Mohamud officially launched the Central State formation conference in Adado. The summit was attended by Federal Cabinet ministers and MPs, state formation technical committee Chairperson Halima Ismael, UN Special Envoy to Somalia Ambassador Nicholas Kay, IGAD Special Ambassador Mohamed Abdi Afey, Ambassador of Turkey Olgen Bakar and Uganda Special Envoy Nathan Mugisha. According to Mohamud, traditional leaders are now tasked with selecting 510 delegates, who will then elect a new regional president within two weeks.
