= Herale =

Herale Xeraale حراله
- district
- Location in Somalia
- Coordinates: 6°01′26.80″N 45°57′47.13″E
- Country: Somalia
- State: Galmudug
- Region: Galguduud
- Time zone: UTC+3 (EAT)

Herale (Somali: Xeraale, Arabic: حراله) is a district situated in the central Galgaduud province of Somalia.
