= List of chief ministers of Galmudug =

Chief Minister of Galmudug
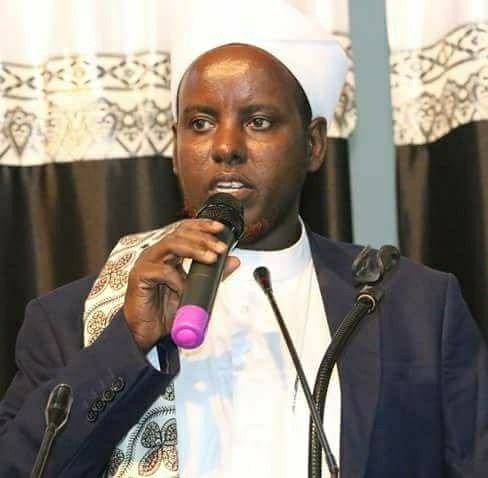
- Type: Head of government
- Appointer: President of Galmudug
- Formation: 6 December 2017
- First holder: Mohamed Ali Hassan
- Final holder: Mohamed Ali Hassan
- Abolished: 2 February 2020

The chief minister of Galmudug was the head of government of Galmudug state of Somalia located in central Somalia. According to the 14-point power-sharing agreement between Galmudug and Ahlu Sunna Waljama'a, the Chief Minister will preside over the state cabinet sessions but won't have the power to appoint or sack ministers. The President will appoint the state ministers then forward it to the chief minister who will then present the names to the state assembly. The agreement also gives the president powers to sack the chief minister.

== List of chief ministers of Galmudug ==
Portrait	Name	Term of office	Political party
	Mohamed Ali Hassan	6 December 2017 – 2 February 2020 (6 years, 123 days)	Independent

== See also ==
- Somalia
  - Politics of Somalia
- Lists of office-holders
- List of current heads of state and government
