= Battle of Shabeelow =

2020 attack in Galmudug, Somalia

- Part of Somali civil war (2009–present)
Date	3–5 September 2020
Location	Shabeelow, Galmudug, Somalia
Result	Shabeelow residents' victory: al-Shabaab expelled from the town

Belligerents
al-Shabaab	Shabeelow residents Galmudug State Forces

Casualties and losses
16+ killed	14+ killed, 6 injured

On 3 and 5 September 2020, al-Shabaab militants attacked the village of Shabeelow in Galmudug, Somalia, sparking clashes with villagers who took up arms in self-defense.

== Background ==
For years, the jihadist militant group al-Shabaab has launched incursions into the village of Shabeelow, pressuring residents to wage jihad against the Somali government and turn over their livestock to al-Shabaab. In response to the constant attacks, residents of Shabeelow had taken up arms to fight against the jihadists. In March 2020, al-Shabaab ordered residents of the village to provide children to fight for the group. Tensions had reportedly risen between the two groups in the days prior to the battle, but these confrontations had no injuries or fatalities.

== Battle ==
Clashes broke out between villagers and al-Shabaab on September 3 after the latter attempted to force villagers to hand over their livestock. When the villagers refused, al-Shabaab placed landmines in and around the village. Villagers who had taken up arms along with nearby freelance militiamen fought back against the jihadists, sparking the clashes. The fighting had a brief lull on September 4 before flaring up later that night and into September 5. The clashes on September 5 lasted for five hours, and left sixteen jihadists and fourteen villagers and militiamen dead. At least six militiamen and villagers were injured as well, and subsequently transported to hospitals in Galkayo.

By September 5, the Somali military's 21st and 15th Battalions headed to Shabeelow to evacuate the injured and dispel al-Shabaab. al-Shabaab claimed that nine Galmudug State Forces militiamen had been killed.
