= Af Barwaaqo =

Town in Mudug, Somalia

Afbarwaaqo
- Town
- Location in Somalia
- Coordinates: 6°29′45″N 48°46′59″E
- Country: Somalia: Galmudug
- Region: Mudug
- Time zone: UTC+3 (EAT)

Afbarwaaqo or Afbarwaqo is a town located in Eastern Mudug region of Galmudug state of Somalia. It is located 176 km northeast of the provincial capital of Galkayo and is primarily inhabited by reer nimcaale .
