= El Buur District =

El Buur
- District
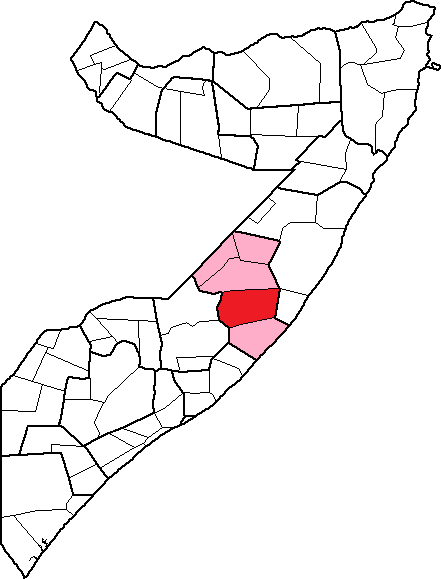
- Location of El Buur District within the Galguduud region.
- Country: Somalia
- Regional State: Galmudug
- Region: Galguduud
- Capital: El Buur

Population
  - Total: 400,000 to 900,000
- Time zone: UTC+3 (EAT)
- +252: +252

El Buur (Somali: Degmada Ceelbur) is a district in the central Galguduud region of Somalia. It is part of the Galmudug state of the Federal Republic of Somalia.
