= Wabho =

- Town
- Location in Somalia.
- Coordinates: 4.5167°N 46.2833°E
- Country: Somalia
- Region: Galguduud
- Time zone: UTC+3 (EAT)

Wabho (Somali: Wabxo) is district in the south Galguduud region of Somalia. The distance between Wabho and Ceelbuuris 43 km, and from Muqdisho it is 333 km.

On June 5, 2009, Wabho was the scene of the Battle of Wabho, fought between on one side, rebels of Hizbul Islam and al-Shabaab and on the other side a pro-government militia Ahlu Sunna Waljama'a. With over 123 killed, it became one of the deadliest battles in the Somali Civil War.
