= Abdisalam Haji Ahmed Liban =

Abdisalam Haji Ahmed Liban (Somali: Cabdisalaam Xaaji Axmed Liibaan, Arabic: عبد السلام حاجي احمد لبنان) is a Somali diplomat and member somali parliament. As of February 2018 he is the ambassador of Somalia to Pakistan, based at the Somali embassy in Islamabad. Previously, he served as Permanent Secretary to the Foreign Affairs Ministry.

He was Vice President of Galmudug under Mohamed Kiimiko from 2006 to 2009.
