= Galinsoor =

Town in Galgaduud, Somalia

- Town
- Location in Somalia.
- Coordinates: 6°25′34″N 46°42′30″E
- Country: Somalia: Galmudug
- Region: Galgaduud
- Time zone: UTC+3 (EAT)

Galinsoor, also spelled Gelinsoor, is a town in Galmudug state of Somalia.
