= Khalif Ahmed Ereg =

Somali politician

- خليف أحمد آرآج

Minister of National Security
- In office 9 July 2014 – 6 February 2015
- Prime Minister: Abdiweli Sheikh Ahmed
- Preceded by: Abdikarim Hussein Guled
- Succeeded by: Abdirisak Omar Mohamed

Personal details
- Party: Independent

Khalif Ahmed Ereg (Somali: Khaliif Axmed Ereg, Arabic: خليف أحمد آرآج) is a Somali politician. From July 2014 to January 2015, he served as the Minister of National Security of Somalia.

== Personal life ==
Ereg hails from the Sacad Habar Gidir sub-clan of the Hawiye.

== Career ==
Ereg previously served as the Banaadir regional security agency chief.

On 9 July 2014, Ereg was appointed Minister of National Security of Somalia by Prime Minister Abdiweli Sheikh Ahmed. He replaced Abdikarim Hussein Guled at the position.

On 27 January 2015, Ereg's term as Minister of National Security of Somalia ended, following the appointment of a new Cabinet by Prime Minister Omar Abdirashid Ali Sharmarke. He was succeeded at the position by Abdulkadir Sheikh Dini.
