= Abdikarim Hussein Guled =

Minister of National Security of Somalia

- عبد الكريم حسين جوليد
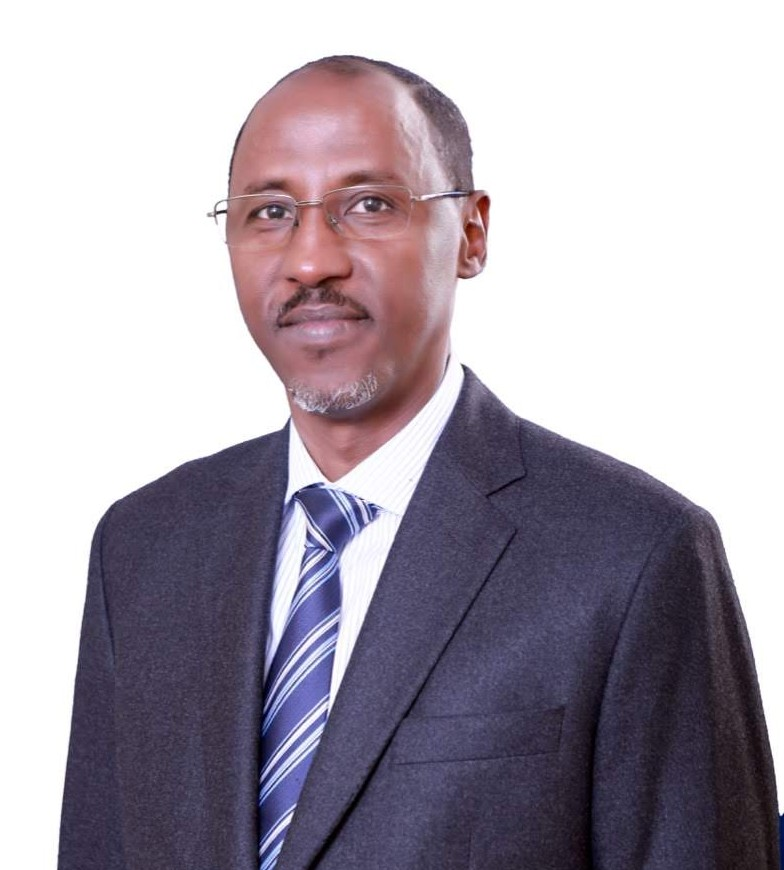

Minister of Interior and Federal affairs
- In office 4 November 2012 – 17 January 2014
- Prime Minister: Abdi Farah Shirdon
- Succeeded by: Abdullahi Godah Barre

4th President of Galmudug
- In office 23 July 2015 – 26 February 2017
- Preceded by: Abdi Hasan Awale Qeybdiid
- Succeeded by: Ahmed Duale Gelle

Personal details
- Born: 1966 (age 59–60) Beledweyne, Somalia
- Party: Peace and Development Party Damujadid party known as xisbiga nabadda.

Abdikarim Hussein Guled (Somali: Cabdikariim Xuseen Guuleed, Arabic: عبد الكريم حسين جوليد; born 1966) is a Somali politician. He previously served as Minister of Interior and Minister of National Security of Somalia. On 4 July 2015 he was elected as the 4th president of Galmudug State of Somalia.

== Biography ==
=== Early years ===
Guled was born in 1966 in the town of Beledweyne, situated in the central Hiran region of Somalia to parents who hailed from Galmudug state of Somalia. He is a schoolteacher by profession.

=== Education ===
Guled is a graduate from the Department of Management at the University of Science and Technology in Yemen.

=== Career ===
From 4 November 2012 to 17 January 2014, he served as the Minister of Interior and Security of Somalia under Prime Minister Abdi Farah Shirdon. Guled's term ended when new Prime Minister Abdiweli Sheikh Ahmed named him the Minister of the newly formed Ministry of National Security.

On 24 May 2014, Guled resigned as National Security Minister following an attack by the Al-Shabaab militant group on the parliamentary building in Mogadishu. Prime Minister Abdiweli Sheikh Ahmed approved Guled's resignation letter and was expected to appoint a new minister to the position, on 4 July 2015. On 9 July 2014, Khalif Ahmed Ereg was appointed Minister of National Security of Somalia by Prime Minister Abdiweli Sheikh Ahmed.

Guled defeated Ahmed Mo'alim Fiqi and was elected the president of the Galmudug region.

== Peace Treaty ==
On 2 December 2015, Guled cosigned the Gaalkacyo Agreement with the President of Puntland Abdiweli Mohamed Ali. Although in this agreement, both presidents agreed to a ceasefire and the withdrawal of military troops, the conflict in Galkacyo continued onwards, as of October 2016.
