= Dusmareb District =

Dusmareb Dhusamareb دوسمريب
- District
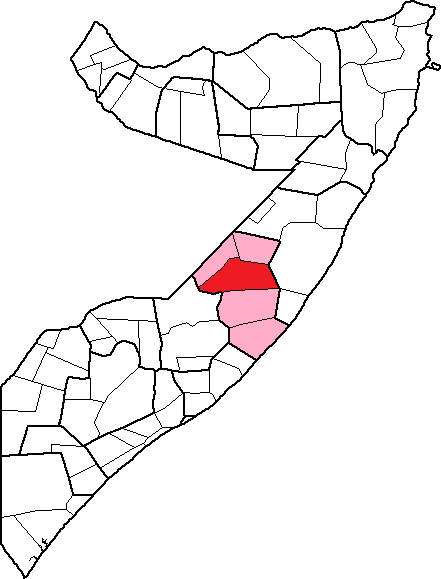
- Location of Dusmareb District within the Galguduud region.
- Country: Somalia
- state: Galmudug
- Capital: Dusmareb

Government
  - mayor: cabdiraxmaan cali (gaadaqorow)

Population (2022)
  - Total: 434,080
- Time zone: UTC+3 (EAT)

Dusmareb District (Somali: Degmada Dhuusamareeb) is a district in the central Galguduud region of Galmudug state of Somalia. Its capital lies at Dusmareb. Dusmareb is the administrative capital of Galmudug state and the Galguduud region. It is primarily inhabited by Somalis from the Hiraab sub-clan of the Habargidir.

A roadside bombing attributed to al-Shabaab killed 13 security forces in Dusmareb on February 6, 2021, shortly after a breakdown in talks about the 2021 Somali presidential election were announced.
