= Galhareri District =

Galhareri District Degmada Galhareeri
- District
- Nickname: Galhareeri Guri Barwaaqo
- Country: Somalia
- Region: Galgaduud

Government
  - Control: Al-Shabaab
- Time zone: UTC+3 (EAT)

Galhareri District (Somali: Galhareeri) is a district in the southwestern Galguduud region of Somalia. Galhareri shares borders with Harardheere to the north, Ceeldheer to the northeast, Derri to the east, Wabho to the west, and El Buur to the south. It is the third-largest city in the Galguduud region.

== History ==
In the 16th century, Galhareeri was Somali's most important city in the Central State. Galhareeri was one of the cities of the Murusade tribe, sub-clan of HAWIYE Clans. At the beginning of the 19th century, it was one of the richest cities in the eastern part of the Central State.
