= Omar Moʽallim Nur =

Somali military commander

Omar Moʽallim Nur (Somali: Cumer Macalin Nuur) is a commander of Ahlu Sunna Waljama'a in Banaadir region in Somalia.
