= Ceel Dheer =

Village in Hiiraan Somalia

Ceeldheer (also recorded as El'der and Uar Addei) is a locality in the western part of the Hiiraan region of Somalia. It is situated near El Ali (Ceel Cali) and approximately 14.8 kilometres north of the El Ali meteorite. Mindat gives the El Ali meteorite locality at approximately 4°17′17″N 44°53′53″E and records the distance between the two localities as 14.8 kilometres.

Geographic-name data associate Ceeldheer with the coordinates 4.4183°N, 44.8717°E and classify the mapped feature as a well. The feature has the GeoNames identifier 62791. Mindat, using GeoNames data, likewise records Ceeldheer as a well in Hiiraan and gives the same coordinates. Somali reporting describes Ceeldheer as a deegaan (locality) and, in a 2015 report on conflict in the area, as a village. Local reporting has also associated El Der with Halgan.

The locality is situated in an area around Halgan and Ceel Cali that has been represented in humanitarian and geographic mapping as part of the rural settlement network of Hiiraan. An IOM displacement map of the region places Ceel Dheer near Halgan, while a 2015 Radio Ergo report describes people displaced from Ceel-dheer and other nearby settlements in western Hiiraan.
