= Ahmed Abdi Karie =

6th President of Galmudug (2020–2026)

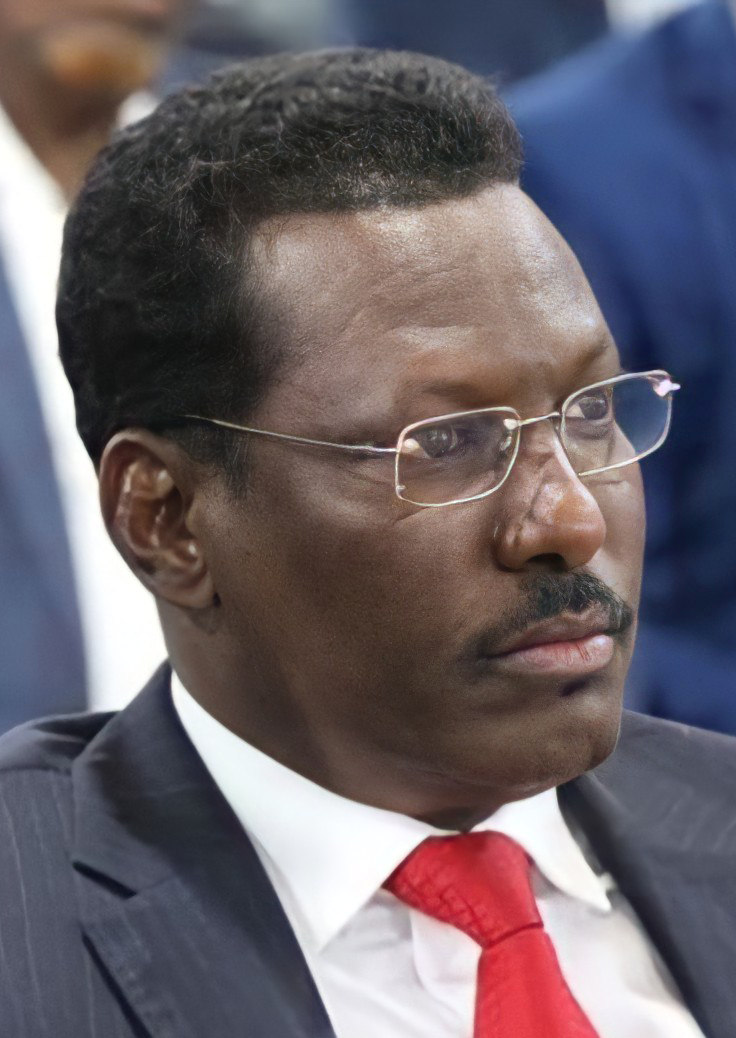

6th President of Galmudug
- In office 2 February 2020 – 22 October 2026
- Vice President: Ali Dahir Eid
- Preceded by: Ahmed Duale Gelle
- Succeeded by: Liban Ahmed Hassan

Minister of State
- In office March 22, 2017 – January 14, 2020

Personal details
- Born: 10 October 1968 (age 58) Hobyo, Somali Republic

Ahmed Abdi Karie, nicknamed "Qoor Qoor" (Somali: Axmed Cabdi Kaariye), was the 6th president of the Galmudug State of Somalia, serving from February 2, 2020 to October 22, 2026. He officially stepped down following a regional election.

He was born in Hobyo, Somalia, on October 10, 1968. He is Habargidir Hawiye clan. He attended school and later moved to Mogadishu in his early years, where he studied at the Science College. He graduated with a Bachelor of Science (B.Sc.) and subsequently worked for his father's business.

== Career ==
=== Galmudug politics ===
Prior to becoming Galmudug's president, Karie was the minister of state for the ministry of public works, reconstruction and public-housing of the federal government of Somalia. His assumption of the office of president is the first time Karie has held any office within Galmudug's government. Due to Karie being a novice to Galmudug politics, some critics have stated that someone with prior experience within the Galmudug cabinet should have been chosen as president.

=== Galmudug president ===
According to Karie, his main tasks as president are to disarm and integrate local clan militias into the state security forces and the construction of the Hobyo port. One form of amendment that has been cited as being required is an overhaul in the manner of the transition of power, as outgoing president Gelle's term expiry appeared to some correspondents to have an arbitrary schedule.

On 2 June 2020, President Karie announced a new plan to disarm clan militias in Galmudug, following a speech he delivered in Galkacyo. On the other hand, he announced all illegal firearms that were in "different hands" would be recovered.

In September 2023 he had a public falling out with his deputy, Ali Dahir Eid.

=== Relationship with the federal government ===
Karie markedly differentiated himself from other holders of Somali federal presidencies by stating that he has a close relationship with Somalia's central government. Third party news outlets also confirmed that Karie was close to Somalia's ruling party and central government.

== See also ==
- Politics of Somalia
- Lists of office-holders
