= .so =

Internet country code top-level domain for Somalia

- Introduced: 28 August 1997
- TLD type: Country code top-level domain
- Status: Active
- Registry: SONIC
- Sponsor: Somali Network Information Center
- Intended use: Entities connected with Somalia
- Actual use: Recently re-established
- Registration restrictions: Limited to institutions and organizations in Somalia, residents of Somalia, others who have a legitimate, clear and provable connection to Somalia
- Structure: Registrations can be made via authorized registrars
- Documents: Somalia .so
- Dispute policies: .so domain name registration policies WIPO
- Registry website: sonic.so

.so is the internet country code top-level domain (ccTLD) for Somalia. After a long absence, the .so domain was officially relaunched on November 1, 2010, by .SO Registry, which is regulated by the nation's Ministry of Posts and Telecommunications. It was launched through various accredited registrars around the world.

On July 8, 2015, the .so ccTLD registry was transferred to the Somali Network Information Center (SONIC), which introduced new limitations on purchasing .so domain names by persons and organizations not affiliated with Somalia. As a result, several registrars suspended the registration of new .so domain names.

On March 9, 2018, Somalia's newly established telecom regulator The National Communications Authority (NCA) took full control of the country's top-level internet domain (dotSO) from the Somali National Information Center (SONIC) and Cloudy Registry, who ran the operations and the management of the domain Registry.

== History ==
=== Overview ===
Due to the civil war in Somalia, operations of this domain were previously officially delegated to Monolith Innovation Group, a company in Pittsburgh, Pennsylvania, which is now defunct. The domain remained delegated to this company, even though it was defunct, until April 17, 2009, at which time the .so domain record was changed in the root zone to point to the servers of the new registry operator, the Ministry of Post and Telecommunications in Somalia.

=== The demise of Monolith (ml.org) ===
Monolith Innovations, as a domain name server, was popular in the mid-1990s.

Second-level domain registrations at the time were (by modern standards) relatively expensive. Monolith operated various projects which allowed small sites to obtain an Internet address of the form example.ml.org at effectively no cost instead of paying full price ($50US in the first year) for a domain like example.com, example.org or example.net

The domain name record for .so was initially created on 28 August 1997, at or near the peak of the ml.org service's popularity. At the time, the potential benefits seemed more than apparent. By taking responsibility for a country code domain, Monolith could have become able to issue *.so domains at second-level for little or no cost, providing a viable alternative to the higher Network Solutions pricing of that era.

According to ml.org's founder, Aveek Datta, in 1998, "I've personally been trying to create a global FREE top level domain. Whether or not this becomes a reality is another question; money talks and big bucks are being waved about in the registry battles." However, the ml.org service ceased operations at the end of 1998 due to "technical and organisational problems" which included major server failures. Its second-level domains remain registered to Aveek Datta, president of the former Monolith Innovations Group, but appear not to be in active use. Throughout the domain's history, a one-page placeholder site at the nic.so address claimed that "no .SO domains are available and we are not looking for any registrar partners."

However, the DNS servers for the domain name were badly configured, so the nic.so address was only available intermittently.

=== Relaunch ===
On February 3, 2009, ICANN approved redelegation of the .so domain to the Ministry of Post and Telecommunications of the Transitional Federal Government of Somalia. In ICANN's meeting minutes, it was revealed that Aveek Datta, the former registry operator, had disputed the redelegation request but he did not respond to ICANN's request to verify his connection with the former company.

The new registry operator relaunched the .so domain on November 1, 2010. Requests to become a registrar can already be submitted using the recently launched website of .SO Registry.

=== Transfer ===
On July 8, 2015, the .so ccTLD registry was transferred to the Somali Network Information Center (SONIC). On March 9, 2018, Somalia's newly established telecom regulator, the National Communications Authority (NCA) took control of the domain name from SONIC and Cloudy Registry, who ran the operations and the management of the domain Registry. Somaliland banned use of this TLD as a result of the 2018 transfer.

== Name spaces ==
The .so domain currently offers thirteen namespaces: the second-level-space .so is intended for general purpose usage, and the third-level-space .com.so, .me.so, .net.so and .org.so are set aside for commercial entities, individuals, networks, and not-for-profit organisations, respectively. There also exists .edu.so for higher education institutions; .gov.so for government entities; .sch.so for schools; and .gm.so, .hs.so, .jl.so, .pl.so, and .sw.so for Galmudug, Hirshabelle, Jubbaland, Puntland, and South West states respectively.

== Registrars ==
SONIC maintains a list of officially accredited local and international registrars.

== See also ==
- Communications in Somalia
