= Somali nationality law =

Somali Citizenship Law

Parliament of Somalia
- Long title: An Act relating to Somali citizenship
- Enacted by: Government of Somalia
- Enacted: 22 December 1962
- Status: Current legislation

Somali nationality law is regulated by the Constitution of Somalia, as amended; the Somali Citizenship Law, and its revisions; and various international agreements to which the country is a signatory. These laws determine who is, or is eligible to be, a national of Somalia. The legal means to acquire nationality, formal legal membership in a nation, differ from the domestic relationship of rights and obligations between a national and the nation, known as citizenship. Nationality describes the relationship of an individual to the nation under international law, whereas citizenship is the domestic relationship of an individual and the state. (Note: Somaliland is an unrecognized state and as such has no legal national sovereignty. Neither Somalia, nor the international community officially recognize the independence of Somaliland, though its de facto authority to control internal affairs within its territory is acknowledged.) Somali nationality is typically obtained under the principle of jus soli, i.e. by birth in Somalia, or jus sanguinis, born to parents with Somali nationality. It can be granted to persons with an affiliation to the country, or to a permanent resident who has lived in the country for a given period of time through grant (naturalization).

== Acquisition of nationality ==
Nationality can be acquired in Somalia at birth if the father is Somali.

=== By birth ===
Those who acquire nationality at birth include children born anywhere as long as their father is Somali, meaning a person who by language, origin, or custom is considered to be part of the Somali nation and they have no other nationality. Foundlings or minor orphans of unknown parentage, under Article 15 of the Somali Citizenship Law are presumed to have a Somali father unless proven otherwise and Somali of origin, meaning they automatically acquire nationality.

=== By grant ===
Naturalization, known as citizenship by grant, can be acquired persons who have resided in the territory for a sufficient period of time to confirm they understand the customs and traditions of the society. General provisions are that applicants have good character and conduct and have resided in the country for a minimum of seven years. There are no provisions for adoptees to acquire nationality in the statutes and when Somalia acceded to the Convention on the Rights of the Child in 2015, they did not agree to Article 20 of the convention concerning child adoptions. Children are required to hold the same nationality as their father, unless he is stateless, in which case, they may acquire the nationality of their mother per Article 14 of the Somali Citizenship Law. However, a child who acquired nationality from its mother may renounce it upon reaching the age of majority. (Note: Bronwen Manby, an expert on African nationality laws, has stated that there are no provisions in the nationality law for stateless children or foundlings in Somali law, or for children to acquire nationality when their father naturalizes. The Committee on the Rights of the Child noted in a 2015 report that Article 14 of the Somali Citizenship Law provides that minors acquire, lose, or recover nationality as their father does. The report further stated that if the father is stateless, the child may acquire nationality from the mother, but at majority may renounce that nationality. It also clarified that under Article 15 children of unknown parents born in the Republic automatically acquire nationality. Ibrahim Hashi Jama, editor of Somoliland Law.com and an attorney, stated in 2014 that digitized copies of the 1962 statute to that date had erroneously omitted Articles 13 to 16. The official publication in the Bollettino Ufficiale, a government gazette, confirmed that the report for the Committee on the Rights of the Child matches provisions in the published statute.) Besides foreigners meeting the criteria, other persons who may be naturalized include:

- The wife of a Somali national automatically acquires her husband's nationality upon marriage;

- Honorary nationality may be granted for exceptional service to the nation at the discretion of the President of Somalia.

== Loss of nationality ==
Somali nationals can renounce their nationality provided they obtain permission from the state. Nationals of origin may not be denaturalized in Somalia. Naturalized persons may lose their nationality by committing crimes against the state or state security or for fraud, misrepresentation, or concealment in a naturalization petition. Nationals who have previously lost their Somali nationality may repatriate by establishing residency for a minimum of three years and applying for naturalization.

== Dual nationality ==
Under the nationality law, dual nationality is forbidden in Somalia, but under the 2012 Provisional Constitution of the Federal Republic of Somalia, which overrides other laws, it is permitted.

== History ==
Historical reference to the Land of Punt occurs in Egyptian records from 3000 BCE. At that time, the peoples of the region included the Jiiddu of the Digil or Rahanweyn clan. By the end of the millennium, both Tunni and Garre tribes had moved into the Jubba Valley. In the first centuries of the common era, migrants from Yemen and Oman settled on the eastern coast of the region. The coastal people engaged in trade with merchants seeking frankincense and myrrh from Abyssinia, Egypt, Greece, Phoenicia, Persia, and Rome. By the sixth century, Zeila had become a major commercial center trading goods from the African interior with foreign merchants. Mogadishu arose as a center of commerce in the south brokering trade with Swahili merchants who brought goods from China, India, and Southwest Asia. In 755 the Persian Abbasid Caliphate subjugated the inhabitants of Mogadishu requiring them to pay taxes.

=== Africans and outsider contact (11th–17th centuries) ===
Between the eleventh and thirteenth centuries, the region converted to Islam. Intermarriage created an Islamic Arab-Somali elite, who established strong, but independent city-states, that dominated both commerce and politics along the coast. In 1300 Abyssinia made the Sultanates of Bale, Dawaro, Fatajar, Hadiya, Harar and Ifat vassal states and required their sultans to pay tribute. Zeila and the other city states, attempted to extend their authority over nomadic peoples in the interior to create a defensive buffer between their strongholds and Abyssinian invaders. In northern Somaliland, sultans had little power, and their title was mostly honorific. Without hierarchical authority, nomadic groups were bound by patrilineal kinship ties, which determined alliances and socio-political divisions. Following the Islamic system of diya, clans had a contractual alliance to pay to and receive damages from other clans, for losses sustained to persons or property. As the payments are collectively paid to the group, collaboration, cooperation, consensus among the males in the clan was necessary to provide for the group security and resolve legal issues.

By the late thirteenth the Hawiye clan had expanded from the Shebelle Valley toward the coast, subjugating the area between Itala and Merca. The Ajuran Sultanate moved into the Shebelle River basin and established coastal commerce links. In the early fourteenth century, the Sultan of Ifat, seized the Abyssinian Sultanates of Bale and Harar, holding them until 1415. After the defeat of the Ifat dynasty, the Adal Sultanate rose to dominate its former territory from their capital at Zeila. Though the Sultan of Adal would remain in power until 1577, between 1445 and 1471 Adal was a vassal state of Abyssinia. In 1499, the Portuguese navigator Vasco da Gama attempted but failed to capture Mogadishu, as did Portuguese attempts to secure Barawa in 1506 and Zeila in 1517. However, in 1507 a Portuguese trading fort was established on Socotra Island. In 1517, Abyssinian and Portuguese troops aligned to capture Zeila and in response the Adal Sultanate recruited troops from the Ottoman Empire. The Ottomans remained in the territory, and in 1557 occupied Arkiko and Massawa.

Around 1560, the Silcis Sultanate of the Hawiye clan moved into the Lower Shabelle Valley and established tributary requirements from the Geledi and Wacdaan subclans. The Silcis may have been part of the Ajuran Sultanate, or its successor in the area of Afgooye. Fighting between the factions continued into the 1570s, when it was halted by the Oromo migration into the southwestern territory of Abyssinia. The struggle to control trade routes caused repeated conflict, which in turn led to migrations of inhabitants. In the seventeenth century the Rahanweyn clan migrated south displacing the Ajuran confederation in the Jubba and Shebelle river basins. The remnants of the Ajuran confederation, as well as their Madanle allies, and the Muzaffarids who had been ousted from Mogadishu in 1624, moved into the northeastern parts of Kenya. Around the same time, the Hiraab Imamate emerged in southern Somalia.

=== Pre-colonial period (18th century-1889) ===
As had been the case in earlier centuries, no single entity ruled in Somalia and Europeans increasingly were encroaching on their territory. While there were no firm borders between the territories ruled by local rulers, they shared grazing territory and engaged in trade, which often became the grounds of conflict. In the early part of the eighteenth century the Geledi and Wacdaan, who lived on opposite sides of the Shabelle River, joined forces to oust the Silcis Sultanate. This action gave rise to the founding of the Geledi Sultanate around 1750, which along with their Wacdaan allies, became the dominant political entity in southern Somalia through the nineteenth century. The Majeerteen Sultanate arose in 1800, in the region now known as Puntland. Another prominent group that emerged in the northwestern portion of the territory was the Isaaq Sultanate. In 1839, the British established a trading fort in Aden, and signed treaties with the Isaaq clan rulers to access food supplies. In 1846, Charles Guillain, a French naval officer, led an expedition to visit the southern coast of Somalia. By the 1850s, the Omani Sultanate, based in Zanzibar, had imposed control over the sultanates on the Banaadir coast and the northern coast was under the control of the Sharif of Mukha, a Yemeni vassal of the Ottoman Empire.

In 1850, Britain signed an agreement with the Majeerteen Sultanate to protect British ships in their waters in exchange for an annual subsidy. France signed treaties with the Sultan of Afar in 1862 and with the Issa elders in 1874, allowing the French to occupy Obock and Tadjoura. In the 1860s civil war ensued in the Majeerteen Sultanate, which lasted five years and resulted in the exile of their ruler. In 1865, Karl Klaus von der Decken, a German explorer, navigated the River Jubba, but was halted by the rapids above Bardera. In the 1870s, the exiled Majeerteen ruler returned and after conquering the Hawiye clans, founded the Sultanate of Hobyo. After the Berlin Conference of 1884–1885, the British began signing agreements with traditional leaders in territory that bordered Ethiopia, French Somaliland (now Djibouti), Italian Somaliland and the Kenya Colony. In exchange for protection from aggressors of the local leaders, the treaties secured protected trade rights for Britain. In 1887, the British notified the signatories to the Berlin agreement of their intent to establish Somaliland as a British protectorate.

=== Southern Somalia under Italian rule (1889–1960) ===
==== Protectorate (1889–1941) ====
Since the unification of Italy in 1870, there was an Italian drive to acquire colonial possessions. Having been unable to secure a protectorate in Tunisia, which was annexed by France in 1881, Italians focused on purchasing the Assab Bay in Eritrea in 1882. In 1889, they signed a treaty with the Sultan of Hobyo, extending a protectorate over his territory. Between 1889 and 1901, they made agreements to acquire the territory of the Sultan of Majeerteen and in 1893, secured treaties to control trade in the port cities of Barawa, Merca, Mogadishu and Uarscheich. They also attempted to extend their rule into Ethiopia in 1896, but were defeated. After the signing of an agreement in 1905 to establish a protectorate over the Nogal region, the Italians decided to unite all of their protectorates into a single administrative unit known as Italian Somaliland (Somala italiana) in 1908.

Italian subjecthood was first declared during the Unification of Italy in 1861. As the states united, their former kingdoms and duchies ceased to exist and no alternative means of belonging had been devised. Thus, in March 1861 the former Savoy-Piedmont-Sardinia Kingdom officially proclaimed that the former Piedmontese subjecthood was extended to the entirety of Italy. Inhabitants were afforded protection based upon their allegiance to the monarchy. Subjecthood was derived from an Italian father, and could only be derived maternally if the father was unknown. Birth in the territory was treated differently in different areas; in some states it conferred subjecthood, and in others it did not. Naturalization and denaturalization processes also varied depending upon the province. In 1865 laws from the various states was codified into national legislation, including a new civil code, which went into force on 1 January 1866.

Under the 1865 Civil Code, unity of the family was a driving foundation of the code, thus the emphasis was on descent. Nationality was derived paternally, regardless of where a child was born, unless the father was unknown. Foundlings born in the territory were presumed to have an Italian father and were granted nationality. Children born in Italy to foreigners who had lived in the territory for ten years, could acquire nationality at majority and those born in the territory to foreigners who did not meet the requisite residency could opt for Italian nationality at majority after service to the nation. Wives were required to follow the nationality of their husband. Italian women married to foreigners lost their Italian nationality and could only reacquire it if the marriage terminated and they established residence in Italy. Foreign women who married Italian men gained Italian nationality and retained it even after termination of the marriage. Nationality provisions were amended by Law 23 of 1901, which allowed children born in the territory or abroad who became foreigners because of a father's loss of nationality to acquire nationality without parliamentary intervention. Because Italy feared that the end of slavery would create both economic issues and conflict with the clans of Somaliland, slavery was not ended until 1903 in the protectorate. Law No. 217 (known as Sonnino's Law), passed on 17 May 1906, allowed naturalization by royal decree if the Council of State supported the application and the applicant either resided in Italy or the colonies for six years, or had provided four years of service to the Italian state, or had been married to an Italian woman for three years. A code drafted in 1907, specified that Italian subjects in Somaliland were to follow local customary law with regard to their religious and tribal affiliation.

Colonial subjecthood differed from that in the motherland. A civil code (Italian: L'ordinamento giuridico della colonia Eritrea) was drafted in 1911, for Eritrea but never officially entered in to force because it was required to be published in Amharic, Arabic, and Italian. Nonetheless, it was used as the guide for persons in Eritrea and Somaliland and provided that persons born in or members of a tribe indigenous to the territory were Italian subjects but did not have the same civil rights as those born in Italy. If a colonial subject naturalized to attain civil rights, their status was not transmissible to other family members. Children born within a legal marriage between colonial subjects and metropolitan subjects automatically became Italian, though the majority of such unions were informal. Those children born outside of marriage, who were legitimated, or legally recognized and registered in official colonial birth records, were also automatically granted Italian nationality with full citizenship. Native women who married metropolitan Italians automatically acquired metropolitan status, but if a metropolitan woman married a native, she was able to retain her status, as it was deemed unlikely that she would be a dependent of a native man.

In 1912, Italy introduced new nationality provisions (Law No. 555) to address Italians living outside of the motherland. It did not challenge the tenet of unity of nationality in the family for metropolitan nationals, and bestowed Italian nationality by descent from an Italian father. But, if the child was born abroad in a country that automatically granted its nationality through jus soli, Italian nationality could be renounced at majority. Adding this provision allowed Italy to perpetually recognize the nationality of emigrants and foster a sense of belonging to Italy, even if expatriates chose to no longer act as citizens. For foreigners, it reduced the general residency requirement to five years, or three years if in service to the state. In 1914, to discourage marriages between colonial and metropolitan subjects, a decree was issued requiring a civil servant to resign their posts upon marriage to a colonial. Three years later, Regent Governor in Eritrea Camillo De Camillis issued an instruction to attribute automatic metropolitan nationality to any bi-racial (Italian: meticci) child regardless of an acknowledgement of paternity.

Between 1922 and 1943, Mussolini's fascist regime expanded its territory in Africa, as well as states in the Mediterranean. Besides Somaliland, Italian territories included Eritrea, Ethiopia, and Libya. A 1933 statute formalized the practice of allowing illegitimate mixed-race children to choose metropolitan status upon reaching their majority. In 1936, the territories of Ethiopia, Eritrea, and Somalia were combined into a single colony, Italian East Africa (Italian: Africa Orientale Italiana). In June, Italy began a redefinition of subjecthood for Italian East Africa. The new statute retained the provision that a colonial subject was one not descended of a metropolitan Italian or national of any other state. It also continued the policy of attributing metropolitan nationality to legitimate or legitimated children of an Italian father. But, it eliminated provisions for mixed-race children to opt for metropolitan status at majority. Further, anti-miscegenation legislation passed in 1937 prohibited concubinage and another promulgated the following year banned formal marriages between metropolitan and native subjects. Mixed marriages became illegal and were punishable with a five year sentence upon conviction. Legislation passed in 1940 barred conferring metropolitan status on mixed-race, illegitimate, legitimate, legitimated children, or children of unknown parentage, unless they had reached age thirteen that year, had been raised as an Italian, and could confirm their good character.

==== British Military Administration (1941–1950) ====
In 1940, the Italians invaded British Somaliland, but were defeated seven months later by British and South African troops as part of the East African Campaign of World War II. The British Military Administration was established in 1941, to oversee Ethiopia and all of the Somali lands including both British and Italian Somaliland, as well as the Haud Reserve. In 1942, Ethiopian sovereignty was restored, but the Military Administration continued to manage affairs in the Ogaden region and part of French Somaliland. In 1946, Ernest Bevin, British Foreign Minister, submitted a proposal to the Allied Powers for British and Italian Somalilands and the Ogaden region to merge into a single United Nations Trust Territory. An agreement was not reached and in 1948, the Ogaden region was incorporated into Ethiopia. The following year, the United Nations established the Trust Territory of Somaliland under Italian administration, which was to take effect in January 1950.

==== United Nations Trust Territory (1950–1960) ====
Under the Trustee program, Somali who had formerly been Italian subjects ceased to be nationals of Italy and had no nationality. The first nationality law for Italian Somaliland was passed during the trustee period under Italian administration. The statute (Law No. 2) of 1 December 1957 granted nationality to any person who was stateless, was born, and had lived in the territory since 1940, if their father was Somali and was either originally from the territory or had a fixed residence in the territory. As the UN Advisory Council noticed the law lacked a means for naturalization, the law was replaced on 12 February 1960, when an Act (Law No. 9) passed to redefine who were nationals. It provided that a person whose father was a national of Italian Somaliland was considered to be a national from birth and that persons who had such a father could acquire Somali nationality by establishing a permanent residence in the territory and renouncing any other nationality. Foreigners could acquire nationality by grant if they resided in the territory for ten years; if they had been born in the territory and their parents had been resident for five years at the time of birth; if they were the child of a Somali mother; or if they had rendered at least three years of service to the Somali government making contributions to the development of the country. Under unity of the family policies, women and children were required to have the same nationality as their husband or father, thus Somali women lost their nationality upon marriage to a foreigner and foreign women gained Somali nationality upon marriage to a Somali husband. Illegitimate children and foundlings who were discovered in the territory could derive nationality through their mother or upon request from the person who had custody of the child.

=== Northern Somaliland under British rule (1898–1960) ===
In 1898, what is currently Somaliland officially became a protectorate known as British Somaliland. In Britain, allegiance, in which subjects pledged to support a monarch, was the precursor to the modern concept of nationality. The crown recognized from 1350 that all persons born within the territories of the British Empire were subjects. Those born outside the realm — except children of those serving in an official post abroad, children of the monarch, and children born on a British ship — were considered by common law to be foreigners. Marriage did not affect the status of a subject of the realm, but under common law, single women, including divorcées, were not allowed to be parents thus their children could not derive nationality maternally and were stateless unless legitimated by their father. British Nationality Acts did not extend beyond the bounds of the United Kingdom of Great Britain and Ireland, meaning that under Britain's rules of conquest, laws in place at the time of acquisition remained in place until changed. Other than common law, there was no standard statutory law which applied for subjects throughout the realm, meaning different jurisdictions created their own legislation for local conditions, which often conflicted with the laws in other jurisdictions in the empire. Thus, a person who was naturalized in Canada, for example, would be considered a foreigner, rather than a British national, in Australia or South Africa. When British protectorates were established in 1815, there was little difference between the rights of British subjects and protected persons.

In 1911, at the Imperial Conference a decision was made to draft a common nationality code for use across the empire. Under terms of the British Nationality and Status of Aliens Act 1914 British protectorates were considered to be foreign territories lacking an internal government. When Britain extended this status over a territory, it took responsibility for both internal and external administration, including defense and foreign relations. Indigenous persons who were born in a protectorate were known as British Protected Persons and were not entitled to be British nationals. BPPs had no right of return to the United Kingdom and were unable to exercise rights of citizenship; however, they could be issued a passport and could access diplomatic services when traveling abroad. In 1914, the Alien Restriction Act clarified that while BPPs were not nationals, neither were they aliens. When the law was amended in 1919, that provision remained the same, meaning that BPPs could not naturalize. Until 1934, when the British Protected Persons Order was drafted, the status of BPP was not statutory, but rather granted at the prerogative of the monarch. Under the 1934 Order, Belonger status with regard to protected territories was defined to mean persons born before or after the Order in a protectorate who possessed no nationality and were not a British subject, or persons born abroad to a native of a protectorate who were stateless and not British subjects. The statute extended BPP status to children and wives of BPPs, if they were stateless, and specifically provided that if a woman married someone who was a national of another nation, she lost her BPP status.

In 1943, the British Nationality Act clarified that BPPs born abroad in territories that were within the Crown's dominions were British subjects by virtue of jus soli, but those born within a protectorate were not subjects. Under the terms of the British Nationality Act 1948, the nationality status of BPPs of British Somaliland did not change. However, the Act, while retaining the provisions that BPPs were not aliens and could not naturalize, allowed BPPs to register as a BPP of a protected place or as a British subject under certain conditions. In 1949, the British Protectorates, Protected States and Protected Persons Order in Council repealed former orders about BPPs and detailed provisions for conferring protected status. It provided that protected persons were BPPs of a protectorate if they were born there; if they were born abroad to a father who was a native of a protectorate; or if at the time of their birth their father was a BPP. It also allowed women married to BPPs to register as a BPP and allowed certain nationals of foreign countries to register as BPPs. Minor changes to protected persons' status were made by Orders of Council in 1952, 1953, 1958, 1960, 1961, and 1962, but major changes did not occur until 1965.

=== Transition to statehood (1948–1960) ===
In 1950, the nationalist movement began to expand in both territories. Political party membership almost doubled between 1950 and 1954. In an effort to move toward a united independence, a conference was held in 1953 to discuss the potential for acquiring Ogaden and the Haud Reserve permanently for the Somalis. Unable to reach an agreement as the governments could not adequately consult with the nomadic population, in 1954, Britain signed a treaty with Ethiopia recognizing Ethiopian sovereignty over the Haud Reserve in exchange for the Ethiopians allowing British protected Somalis moving into the area under traditional grazing customs. The Haud Reserve remained a contentious issue because Somali following their herds into Ethiopian territory spent a considerable amount of time in Ethiopian territory. In 1956, a cabinet and legislative assembly were established in the Trust Territory and the following year a legislative council was created in British Somaliland. Because of a shared past of colonialism and culture, talks were held to plan for unification at a conference in April 1960 held at Mogadishu to discuss a union of both northern and southern Somaliland, as a means to reduce clan conflicts. In preparation for statehood, a Constituent Assembly in the Trust Territory adopted the Constitution of the Somali Republic on 21 June 1960.

=== Post-independence (1960–present) ===
On 26 June 1960, British Somaliland gained its independence. Under the terms of the Nationality and Citizenship Ordinance (No. 15), passed three days prior, at independence, Somali who were stateless and were born in British Somaliland, or if legitimate whose father and if illegitimate whose mother was born in the territory were conferred nationality of Somaliland and ceased to be BPPs. Persons who had lived in British Somaliland for a year could register for nationality if they did not meet the provisions to automatically acquire nationality at independence, provided they renounced any other nationality. Those born in the territory after independence acquired nationality if legitimate from a father and if illegitimate from a mother. Married women followed the nationality of their husband. On 27 June 1960, the northern former British Somaliland drafted the Union of Somaliland and Somalia Law, and passed the legislation, but the southern former Italian Somaliland did not ratify the agreement. Instead the south passed their own Act of Union (Atto di Unione) on 1 July, with significantly different terms and drafted a constitution. On 1 July 1960 Italian Somaliland became independent and despite the failure to agree on terms of union and the fact that Italian Somaliland was still a Trust Territory, the two states were joined to form the Somali Republic. On 3 August, anyone who had remained a BPP in British Somaliland because they had not been attributed nationality by Ordinance 15 ceased to be a BPP.

To overcome the lack of a unification agreement, a presidential decree was prepared to rectify the situation, but it failed to gain legislative approval. It was then proposed that the union would be addressed in a constitutional plebiscite scheduled for June 1961. Under the terms of the proposed constitution, Mogadishu rather than Hargeisa was to be the capital and the legislative seats were assigned giving northern Somalia thirty-three and southern Somalia ninety-nine representatives. As a result of the failure to come to agreement and the imbalance of power in the constitutional draft, the north boycotted the 1961 constitutional referendum and just over five percent of the northern population voted. Of those who participated, sixty percent opposed the new constitution. However, since the northern population made up only 100,000 of the 1,952,660 voters, the result was the adoption of the proposed constitution. Under the terms of the constitution, an Act of Union was promulgated on 31 January 1961 which was retroactively in effect from 1 July 1960. Under the terms of the Act of Union persons who were nationals of either Somaliland or Somalia became nationals of the Somali Republic.

The constitution called for a Citizenship Law to define the grant of nationality after the union, which led to the passage of the Somali Citizenship Law (No. 28) of 22 December 1962. It provided that both Law No. 9 of 12 February 1960 for Italian Somaliland and Ordinance No. 15 of 25 June 1960 for British Somaliland were repealed. After independence children acquired nationality from a Somali father who was a national or through a person who by language, origin, or tradition was considered Somali. It allowed persons who had resided in the territory for seven years or those whose mothers were Somali after a two-year residency to acquire nationality through a grant. Minors acquired, lost, or recovered nationality when their father changed his nationality, the only exception was that if a father was stateless, a child could obtain nationality maternally. Foundlings or minor orphans were assumed to be Somali and automatically derived nationality, unless parentage was later proven otherwise. Foreign women who married Somali husbands automatically acquired Somali nationality. Nationality could be lost by obtaining dual nationality, serving a foreign government or military, establishing a residence abroad, or by a woman marrying a foreigner and acquiring his nationality.

In 1969, the president was assassinated during a coup d'état and the constitution was suspended. Somalia became a Soviet satellite state and hopes were revived for an egalitarian Somali nation. War between Somalia and Ethiopia broke out in 1977 because of hopes of creating a Greater Somalia and uniting Somali ethnic groups from Djibouti, the Ogaden Region of Ethiopia, the Northern Frontier District of Kenya and the Somali Democratic Republic. Somalia was defeated, Djibouti rejected the proposal, and the Soviet Union withdrew its support to the country. Continued police-state policies by the end of the 1980s, had pushed the country to civil war. Between 1990 and 1992 the Somali state collapsed because of waves of violence, accelerated by a dramatic rise in the availability of weapons; the inability of clan elders to enforce customary law; and an enormous famine which spread across southern Somalia. In 1993, fourteen factions in Somalia signed a cease fire agreement and agreed to attend a National Reconciliation Conference in March 1993, where formal peace documents were signed. Continued flair ups occurred until 1997, when a second conference secured a peace accord among twenty-six faction leaders. In 2000 the Transitional Federal Government of Somalia was formed, which was recognized in 2004, by the United Nations as the official government of the Republic.

During this period, in 1991, Somaliland revoked the Act of Union, declaring its independence. It established a bicameral legislature, created an interim constitution and appointed a president. Civil war broke out between the northern clans, which ended after a national reconciliation conference was called in 1996. A new interim constitution was adopted in 1997 and submitted to a plebiscite in 2001. Nearly ninety-eight percent of the population of nearly one and a quarter million people approved the constitution and independence for Somaliland. The international community was unwilling to officially recognize the sovereignty of Somaliland without official recognition and membership in the African Union. In 2005, Somaliland submitted an application for membership and the African Union conducted a fact-finding mission on the country. While recognizing Somaliland's territorial claim to its former colonial boundaries, it refused to grant membership on the basis that it was seceding from an internationally recognized state. Under international jurisprudence, the United Nations typically refuses to acknowledge breakway states without the consent of the parent state, unless severe breaches of human rights have occurred or the parent state has ceased to exist. Following this policy, United Nations agencies and officials have not recognized Somaliland's sovereignty and citizens of Somaliland must travel using passports issued by Somalia.

In 2004, the Transitional Government enacted the Transitional Federal Charter of the Somali Republic, which provided that none of the territories within the republic were independent. It specified that those who had previously been nationals of the Somali Republic continued to be so and that those born after the promulgation of the charter obtained nationality by birth in the territory or to a Somali father. In August 2012, the first permanent government since the civil war was established and enacted a new constitution. Under the terms of the 2012 Constitution, all children were guaranteed a right to nationality, verbiage was repeated that only one nationality existed for Somali people, dual nationality was permitted, and it called for a new nationality law to be drafted. In 2016, a bill to amend the Citizenship Law was drafted. Under its terms, women and men would equally be able to pass on their nationality to their children and spouses. Women would no longer lose their nationality if they married a non-Somali. It carried provisions that children born in Somalia who would otherwise be stateless could acquire Somali nationality, as well as abandoned children and adoptees. The amendment also addressed the discrepancy between the 2012 Constitution and the 1962 Citizenship Law regarding the acceptance of dual nationality. As of 2021, the bill had not yet been passed or implemented.

== See also ==
- Immigration to Somalia
- Somali passport
