= Adado =

- City
- Nickname: Blue City
- Location in Galmudug.
- Coordinates: 6°08′25″N 46°37′32″E
- Country: Somalia
- State: Galmudug
- Region: Galguduud
- Founded: 1950s

Government
  - Mayor: Farah Dirie Warsame

Area
  - Total: 40 km^{2} (15 sq mi)

Population (2019)https://citypopulation.de/en/somalia/admin/galgaduud/1903__cadaado/#google_vignette
  - Total: 121,153
  - Density: 3,000/km^{2} (7,800/sq mi)
- Demonym(s): Hemanian, Hemani
- Time zone: UTC+3 (EAT)
- Climate: BSh

Adado (Somali: Cadaado, Arabic: عدادو, Italian: Adado) or “Blue City” is situated in the Galgadud region of Somalia. It served as the capital city of the Heman and Heeb State from 2008 to 2015.

== Etymology ==
Adado City is named after the cadaad tree that grows in the valleys of Mudug and Galgaduud regions of Somalia.

== History ==
Adado was founded in the 1950s by Sheikh Mohamud Hassan Sharmake, Sheikh Hassan Ali Dhore, Isse Eid, and others.

In 1978, Adado was officially recognized as a full district by President Mohamed Siad Barre.

Following the beginning of the civil war, Adado became a hub for internally displaced people from both southern and northern regions of Somalia.

In 2008, Adado was designated as the capital city of the newly established Himan and Heeb State.

In 2015, Adado became a part of the newly formed Galmudug State of Somalia, hosting important meetings and negotiations that ultimately led to its establishment.

== Transportation ==
Air transportation in the city is served by Adado International Airport as the largest airport in Galmudug. A major renovation took place in the airport in 2022, a new airport immigration was built in 2013 funded by the former regional state of Himan and Heeb.
