= List of presidents of Galmudug =

President of the Galmudug
- Flag of Galmudug

- Incumbent; Liban Ahmed Hassan since 22 October 2026
- Website: https://statehouse.gm.so/

The president of Galmudug is the head of state and head of government of Galmudug, a federated state of the Federal Republic of Somalia. The president and vice president are elected for a four-year term, and can serve two consecutive terms.

== List ==
№	Portrait	President (birth–death)	Term of office		Vice President	Political party
1		Mohamed Kiimiko (1937–2019)	14 August 2006	14 August 2009	Abdisalam Haji Ahmed Liban	Independent
2		Mohamed Ahmed Alin (1951–2023)	14 August 2009	1 August 2012	Abdisamad Nur	Independent
3		Abdi Qeybdid (1948–)	1 August 2012	23 July 2015	Abdisamad Nuur Gulled	Independent
4		Abdikarim Hussein Guled (1966–)	23 July 2015	26 February 2017	Mohamed Hashi Abdi	Peace and Development Party
—		Mohamed Hashi Abdi (–); Acting	26 February 2017	3 May 2017	Mohamed Hashi Abdi	Independent
5		Ahmed Duale Gelle (1949–)	3 May 2017	2 February 2020	Mohamed Hashi Abdi	Independent
6		Ahmed Abdi Karie (1968–)	2 February 2020	22 October 2026	Cali Ciid	Independent
7		Liban Ahmed Hassan	22 October 2026	Incumbent	Abdiweli Ibrahim Garyare	Justice and Solidarity Party

== See also ==
- List of presidents of Somaliland
- List of presidents of Jubaland
- List of presidents of Puntland
- List of presidents of Somalia
