= Dusamareb =

Dusamareb Dhusamareeb (in Somali) دسمريب (in Arabic)
- City
- Nickname: Dar Dheer
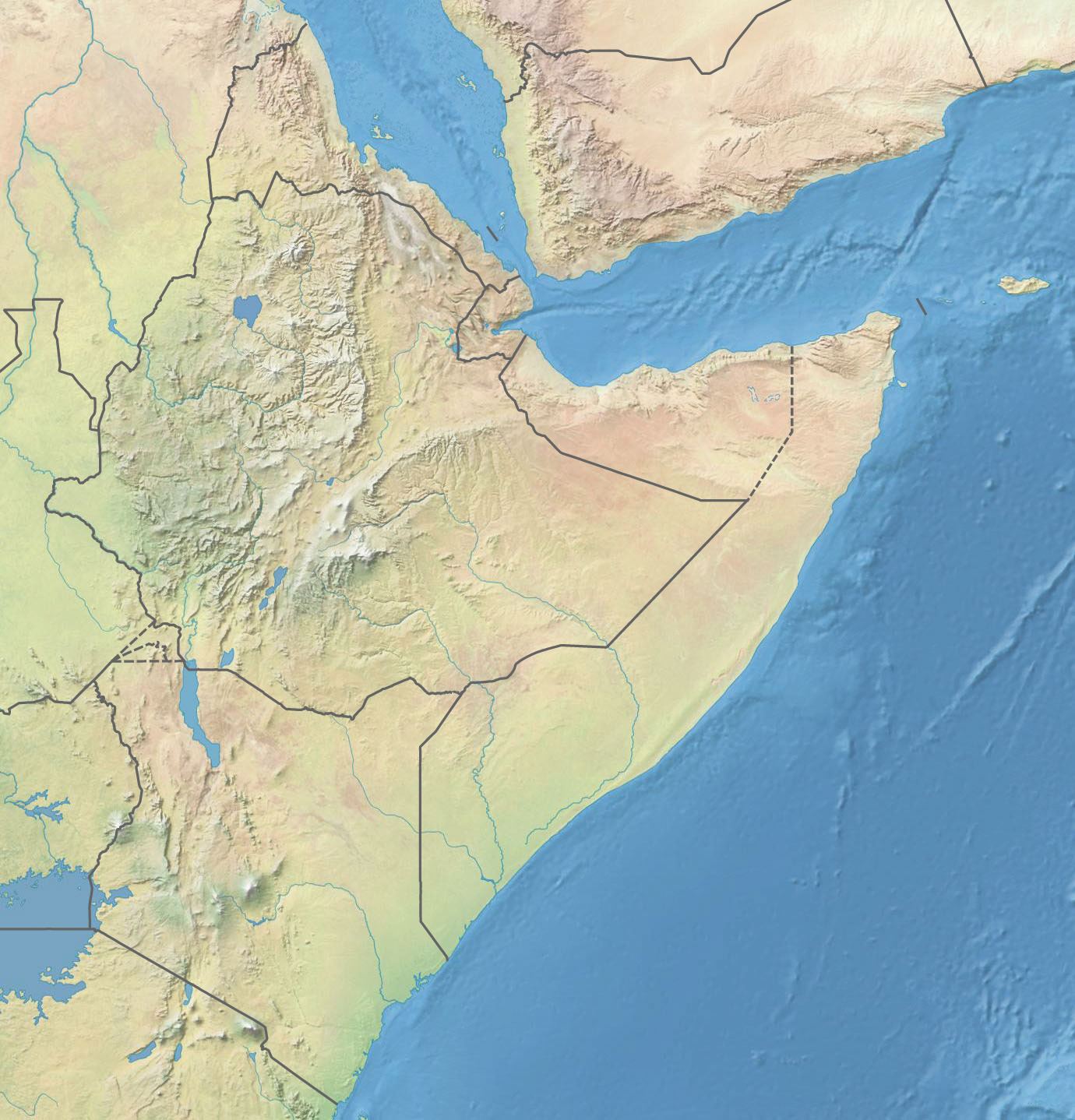
- Location within Somalia Location within the Horn of Africa Location within Africa
- Coordinates: 5°32′06″N 46°23′10″E
- Country: Somalia
- State: Galmudug
- Region: Galguduud

Government
  - Type: Mayor-Council-Commission
  - Mayor: Abdirahman Ali Mohamed (Geeda qorow)

Population
  - Total: 680,407
- Time zone: UTC+3 (EAT)
  - Summer (DST): UTC+3
- Area code: +252

Dusamareb (Dusmareb, Somali: Dhuusamareeb, Arabic: دسمريب, Italian: Dusa Mareb) is the capital of Galmudug state in central Somalia. The city also serves as the administrative capital of the Galguduud province.

== Name ==
Historically, the city was known as Hamurey or Daar Dheer or simply Dardher. While there are various theories regarding the origin of the name Dusamareb, because it sounds like a word with negative meanings in Somali, a small-scale survey found that 81% of residents expressed dissatisfaction with the name, and 74% said they were in favor of renaming it. Successive administrations have proposed changing the city's name on several occasions, but none of these proposals have been implemented.

== Recent history ==
In August 2004, fighting broke out between militias in Dusamareb and other areas, and civilians, including children and women, were killed. According to a report from May 2007, international medical aid has been restricted due to inter-clan conflicts there.

In May 2008, the U.S. military carried out an airstrike on Dusamareb, killing 30 people, including the Islamic militant group Al-Shabaab commander Aden Ayro, who was hiding there, as well as Al-Shabaab militants and civilians. In September 2008, a Japanese female doctor and a Dutch male nurse working for Médecins du Monde were kidnapped in the Ogaden region of Ethiopia's Somali State; the kidnappers took them to their base in Dusamareb and demanded a ransom. In November 2008, an armed group attacked an airstrip near Dusamareb and kidnapped four staff members of the France-based aid organization Action Against Hunger, among others.

In early December 2008, Al-Shabaab fighters captured Dusamareb. In January 2009, a Sufi militia Ahlu Sunna Waljama'a (ASWJ), which opposed Al-Shabaab, captured Dusamareb and Guriel from Al-Shabaab. ASWJ established its base in Dusamareb. In January 2010, al-Shabaab attacked Dusamareb and temporarily occupied it, but it was soon recaptured by ASWJ. In March 2010, Ahlu Sunna Waljama'a formed an alliance with the Somali government. In April 2011, al-Shabaab recaptured Dusamareb but withdrew later that same day. In December 2012, it was reported that the nutritional status of internally displaced persons gathered in Dusamareb was critical. In December 2014, fighting broke out in Dusamareb between the Somali armed forces and ASWJ, resulting in the death of one soldier and injuries to two civilians. The fighting subsequently subsided, and the governor of Galgaduud stated that the Somali armed forces were governing and maintaining control of the town.

In January 2018, ASWJ was integrated into Galmudug. As a result, Dusamareb became the capital of Galmudug in both name and reality. In February 2020, when a new president was elected in Garmdug, ASWJ reacted it, and fierce fighting broke out in Dusamareb. This ultimately led to the dissolution of ASWJ.

== Demographics ==
As of 2016 the broader Dusmareb District had a population of 390,407 inhabitants. Dusamareb has a large population of pastoralists.

This area is known for the rivalry between the Habar Gidir/Ayr and Duduble sub-clans of the Hawiye/Hiraab clan.

== Education ==
There are many universities located across the city, the most prominent one being Dusmareb University which provides undergraduate degrees.

== Notable residents ==
- Dr. Abdiqasim Salad Hassan - 5th President of Somalia
- Abdiweli Mohamed Ali Gaas - 15th Prime Minister of Somalia and Former President of Puntland
- Abdi Farah Shirdon – 16th Prime Minister of Somalia
- Ahmed Abdisalam Adan - Former Deputy of Prime Minister of Somalia
- Sheikh Mohamed Shakir - Former Chief Minister of Galmudug
- Magool - Famous Somali singer
- Hassan Dahir Aweys - Former Somali Military colonel and Former leader of Hizbul Islam
- Aden Hashi Farah Aero - Former Leader of Al-Shabaab
- Mahad Mohamed Salad - Somali senator and Former Minister of Presidential Affairs.
- Abdulkadir Hersi Siyad (Yamyam) - Poet and playwright
- Shire Jama Ahmed - Somali Linguist
