= Ahlu Sunna Waljama'a =

Somalia-based Sufi paramilitary group

- Leaders: Sheikh Ibrahim Sheikh Hassan (Chairman/Head of state); Shaykh Mahmud Shaykh Hasan Farah (Spiritual leader); Omar Moʽallim Nur (Commander in Banaadir); Mohamed Ali Hassan (Former Chief Minister of Galmudug)
- Dates active: 1991 – present
- Groups: Multi-clan, though primarily Habar Gidir
- Headquarters: Dhusamareb
- Active regions: Galgudug, Hiran, Gedo, Bakool
- Ideology: Sufism; Sunni Islamism
- Size: 5,000
- Wars: Somali Civil War

Ahlu Sunna Waljama'a (ASWJ) (Somali: Ahlu Suna Waljamaaca) is a Somalia-based paramilitary group consisting of moderate Sufis opposed to radical Salafism. The group opposes extremist interpretations of Islam, as well as laws banning music and khat. The group seeks to protect religious shrines from demolition.

== Background and origins ==
The Ahlu Sunna Waljama'a (ASWJ) was formed in 1991 in opposition to Salafi Islamist groups such as Al Ittihad Al Islamiya, under the guidance of General Mohamed Farah Aidid. He viewed the organization as an important counter-force to more radical Islamist factions. During the civil war the organization worked in cooperation with Aidid's faction, the Somali National Alliance.

Originally ASWJ focused on community religious affairs and was not primarily a militant organization prior to 2008. In 2008, ASWJ gained prominence as the main resistance force to the militant organization Al Shabaab, which was conducting many anti-Sufi attacks and destroying sacred Sufi tombs. In response to those attacks, ASWJ organized itself as a cohesive militant force for the first time, taking its fighters from clan militias. In March 2009, after Al Shabaab killed multiple Sufi clerics, ASWJ declared jihad against it. ASWJ and al-Shabaab battled each other for control of various areas in central Somalia during 2008 and 2009. ASWJ are fighting to prevent strict Sharia and Wahhabism from being imposed, while protecting local Sunni-Sufi traditions and generally moderate religious views.

== Conflict with Al-Shabaab ==
- In 2008, al-Shabaab conducted several anti-Sufi attacks and ASWJ began fighting them. ASWJ won large victories in central Somalia and controlled the majority of southern Mudug, Gedo and Galgaduud, as well as parts of Hiran, Middle Shebelle, and Bakool. The group received support from the Ethiopian government, and has been considered by some to be a tool for power projection and political influence for Ethiopia in Somalia.
- On March 15, 2011, the Somali transitional government and Ahlu Sunna Waljama'a signed an agreement giving the militia control of five ministries, in addition to diplomatic posts and senior positions within the national security apparatus. In exchange, the militia would lend military support against al-Shabaab.
- On April 24, 2011, Ahlu Sunna Waljama'a recaptured Dhuusamareeb in the Galguduud region from Al-Shabaab.
- On April 28, 2011, Ahlu Sunna Waljama'a backed by Transitional Federal Government soldiers were fighting against Al-Shabaab in the town of Luuq in the Gedo region. 27 Ahlu Sunna Waljama'a- and 8 TFG soldier were killed during the battle. Al-Shabaab casualties were unknown.
- On May 3, 2011, several hours of fighting between Ahlu Sunna Waljama'a backed by TFG soldiers against Al-Shabaab took place in the town of Garbaharey in the Gedo region. The town fell into the hands of Ahlu Sunna Waljama'a and TFG. 3 Ahlu Sunna Waljama'a- and 23 Al-Shabaab fighters were killed in action. During the fighting Ahlu Sunna Waljama'a's chairman of Gedo region Sheikh Hassan Sheikh Ahmed (a.k.a. Qoryoley) was wounded. He died in a Nairobi hospital 2 days later.
- On March 1, 2012, heavy clashes between Ahlu Sunna Waljama'a backed by TFG soldiers and Al-Shabaab fighters took place in Garbaharey town, the capital of Gedo region in Southern Somalia. Government officials said that Ahlu Sunnah Waljama'a and TFG fighters successfully repelled Al-Shabaab attacks on government bases throughout the night of February 29 and March 1.
- On January 18, 2014, Ahlu Sunna Waljama'a's leadership objected to the new Cabinet lineup named by federal Prime Minister Abdiweli Sheikh Ahmed. ASWJ Chairperson Sheik Ibrahim Hassan Gureye argued that many of the new ministerial positions went to unsuccessful officials from previous administrations, so the outcome of their reappointments would likely be the same.
- On February 11, 2015, a dispute erupted in the town of Guricel, 400 km north of Mogadishu. The town is in Galgaduud, west of Dhuasamareb. The dispute took place between Ahlu Sunna Waljama'a and Somali National Army fighters, and led to at least 16 dead (three of whom were civilians) and 14 wounded. The dispute was apparently related to a local power struggle between politicians meeting in Dhuasamareb, in the north-central Galgadud region. The soldiers then withdrew from the town. A counterattack involving shelling from both sides was organized the following day with the soldiers withdrawing after 9 combatants were killed. Ahlu Sunna spokesman Abdinoor Mohamed Hussein later clarified that the dispute was not between Somali government troops and Ahlu Sunna, but instead between Ahlu Sunna and two particular state officials, Mahad Mohamed Salad, the State Minister for the Presidency, and Mohamed Roble Jimale 'Gobale', Commander of Brigade 3 in Mogadishu. Ahlu Sunna accused the two men of misusing and hiding behind federal manpower and resources to settle personal grievances with the group.
- On February 14, a delegation of politicians and traditional elders led by former president of Galmudug regional state Mohamed Ahmed Ma'alim brokered a ceasefire between the feuding parties. The unconditional truce was slated to be followed by reconciliation talks amongst the local stakeholders.
- On 5 March, Minister of Defense Abdulkadir Sheikh Dini and Ahlu Sunna leader Sheikh Mohamed Shakir signed a five-point joint agreement stipulating that there would be a bilateral ceasefire, troops would retreat without any offensives or arms use, government forces would be garrisoned in Dhusamareeb while Ahlu Sunna troops would be stationed in Guriel, displaced local residents should return to their houses, and a reconciliation conference would be launched within a ten-day window period.
- On 18 January 2018, Ahlu Sunna merged its forces and administration into Galmudug State's regional government and security forces.

Renewed fighting began in September 2021 in the Galgadud region is due to a dispute between Ahlu Sunna and the Galmudug regional administration.

- On 30 September 2021, fighting broke out in Bohol near Dhusamareb. At least 10 people were killed and many were wounded.
- On 1 October 2021, Ahlu Sunna seized the town of Guri El.

== See also ==
- Islam in Somalia
- Somali Civil War (2009–present)
- Ahle Sunnat Barelvi, a Sufi movement with a similar ideology in South Asia
- Army of the Men of the Naqshbandi Order, a militant Sufi movement with a similar ideology in Iraq
