= Galguduud =

Region of Somalia

Galguduud غالغدود Galgudud, Ghelgudud
- Region
- Galguduud in Somalia
- Interactive map of Galguduud غالغدود
- Coordinates: 5°20′13″N 46°37′13″E
- Country: Somalia
- Regional State: Galmudug
- Capital: Dusmareb

Area
  - Total: 46,126 km^{2} (17,809 sq mi)

Population (2019)
  - Total: 634,300
  - Density: 13.75/km^{2} (35.62/sq mi)
- Time zone: UTC+3 (EAT)
- ISO 3166 code: SO-GA
- HDI (2021): 0.279 low · 17th of 18

Galguduud (Somali: Galgaduud, Arabic: جلجدود, Italian: Galgudud or Ghelgudud) is an administrative region (gobol) of Galmudug state in central Somalia. Its administrative capital is Dusmareb. The largest town in the region is El Buur, which lies at the centre of the region.

Galguduud is bordered by Ethiopia; the Somali regions of Mudug, Hiran, and Middle Shebelle (Shabeellaha Dhexe); and the Indian Ocean. The largest clan in this region is the Hawiye, specially the Murusade and the Duduble subclans, as well as the Habargidir. The region of Galgaduud and southern Mudug formed the Galmudug State by 2016, which considers itself an autonomous state within the larger Federal Republic of Somalia, as defined by the Provisional Constitution of the Federal Republic of Somalia.

== Districts ==
Galguduud Region consists of 11 districts:

1. Dusmareb (Dhusamareb) District
2. El Bur (Ceelbuur) District
3. Abudwak District
4. El Garas (Ceel Garas) District
5. Adado (Cadaado) District.
6. Xiindheere District.
7. Galcad District
8. Galhareri District.
9. Bargan (Bargaan) District.
10. El Dher (Ceeldheer) District.
11. Wabho District

Abdilahi bile district

== Borders ==
Galguduud is bordered by Somali galbeed or the Feerfeer-Dharkayn Geenyo Line to the west, the Somali region of Mudug to the north; Hiran and Middle Shebelle (Shabeellaha Dhexe) to the south, and the Indian Ocean to the east.
