= Galmudug =

State in Somalia

Galmudug State of Somalia: Maamul-Goboleedka Galmudug ee Soomaaliya (Somali); ولاية جلمدج الصومالية (Arabic); Wilayat Gālmuḍug aṣ-Ṣūmāl
- Flag Coat of arms
- Motto: "Qolobaa Calankeed"
- Anthem: Qolobaa Calankeed
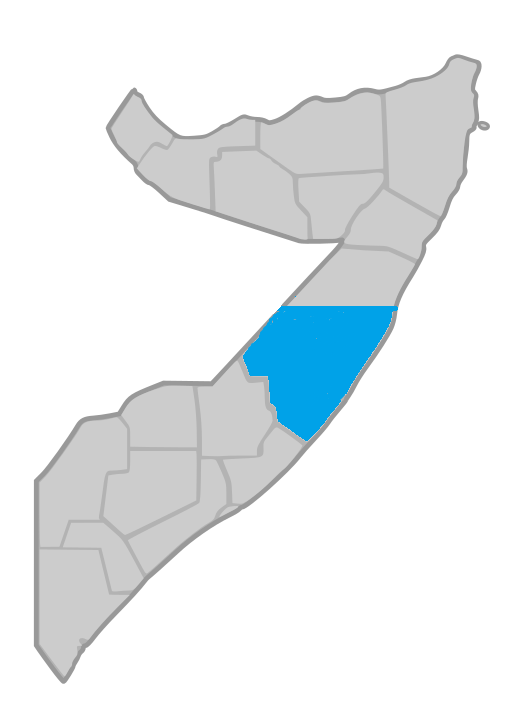
- Location of the Galmudug State within Somalia
- Capital and largest city: Dusmareb; 5°32′06″N 46°23′10″E
- Official languages: Somali Arabic
- Demonym: Somali
- Government: Federated state under a presidential democracy
  - President: Ahmed Abdi Karie
  - Vice President: Cali Ciid
  - Speaker of Parliament: Mohamed Nur Gacal

Federal Member State within Somalia

Area
  - Total: 100,370 km^{2} (38,750 sq mi) (205,390 sqKM2)

Population
  - 2014 estimate: 1,300,000
- Currency: Somali shilling (SOS)
- Time zone: UTC+3 (EAT)
  - Summer (DST): UTC+3 (not observed)
- Calling code: +252 (Somalia)
- ISO 3166 code: SO
- Internet TLD: .so
- Website galmudug.gov.so

Galmudug (Arabic: جلمدج; Italian: Galmudugh), officially Galmudug State of Somalia (Somali: Maamul-Goboleedka Galmudug ee Soomaaliya), is a Federal Member State in central Somalia, with its capital at Dhusamareb. It is bordered to the north by the Puntland state of Somalia, to the west by the Somali Region in Ethiopia, to the east by the Indian Ocean and to the south by the Hirshabelle state of Somalia. Consisting of the Galgaduud region and Mudug region, Galmudug's name is derived from a conflation of the names of the two regions. Galmudug is a federal state within the larger Federal Republic of Somalia, as defined by the provisional constitution of Somalia.

== Location ==
Galmudug is the most centrally located area in Somalia. It is situated about 750 km from Mogadishu, Bosaso and Harar in Ethiopia. The region is bordered to the east by the Indian Ocean, to the west by Ethiopia, to the north by Puntland, and to the south by the Hirshabelle.

== History ==
The autonomous Galmudug region was established. Mohamed Warsame Ali 'Kiimiko' was elected as the new administration's president, and Galkayo was declared the new polity's capital.

The appellation Galmudug is a conflation of Galguduud, Galwaaq and Mudug provinces.

Relations between Galmudug and the Puntland region to its immediate north have historically been tense. However, the two regions gradually made strides toward strengthening inter-regional relations. To this end, representatives of the two autonomous administrations signed an accord in February 2011 in Garowe, the capital of Puntland, wherein both governments officially agreed to cooperate on security, economic and social matters.

=== Presidential elections ===
On 1 August 2012, Galmudug's 25-seat parliament elected General Abdi Hasan Awale (Qaybdiid) as the region's new president. He replaced former president Mohamed Ahmed Aalin, who was receiving medical treatment abroad. Qaybdiid had obtained 22 votes versus 1 vote for the other candidate, Abdisamad Nur Guled. Qaybdiid was subsequently sworn in as Galmudug President in a ceremony in Galkayo marking the 6th anniversary since the establishment of the Galmudug administration. During his inauguration speech, Qaybdiid reiterated his pre-election promises to firm up on regional security, expand his administration's control to areas that had not been covered by the regional authority, and foster relations with neighbouring regional states and national bodies.

=== Official status ===
As of 2013, Galmudug's official status as a federal state is in the process of being finalized. Qaybdiid's administration has asserted that Galmudug meets the requirements for official state status, as outlined in the federal constitution. As of April 2013, the federal authorities have not accepted this claim. Article 49 of the Provisional Federal Constitution, which oversees the establishment of the Federal Republic of Somalia's constituent states, stipulates that "based on a voluntary decision, two or more regions may merge to form a Federal Member State". Since Galmudug only includes part of the official Mudug region, the federal Interior Minister Abdikarim Guled has urged the local Galmudug authorities to merge with other would-be states, including Himan and Heeb, to form one unitary state consisting of two or more regions, in accordance with the constitution.

On 30 July 2014, the Federal Government of Somalia officially endorsed a new Central Regions State, following a signed agreement in Mogadishu between representatives from Galmudug, Himan and Heeb, and Ahlu Sunna Waljama'a. The formalization ceremony for the new federal state was held at the Villa Somalia presidential compound and was presided over by President of Somalia Hassan Sheikh Mohamud and Prime Minister Abdiweli Sheikh Ahmed, with UN, EU, AU, IGAD and AMISOM envoys also in attendance. According to the Prime Minister's office, the Federal Government appointed a ministerial committee to guide the formation of the new state. It also organized a number of consultative meetings with the regional representatives, with each party eventually agreeing to establish a new administration in the Mudug and Galguduud regions. Additionally, the Central Regions State will be subject to the Provisional Federal Constitution.

On 31 July 2014, the autonomous Puntland regional administration in northeastern Somalia issued a statement rejecting the Central Regions State agreement on the grounds that it contravened certain clauses and articles in the Provisional Federal Constitution and breached Puntland's jurisdiction over the northern part of the Mudug province. The Puntland Council of Ministers led by Puntland President Abdiweli Mohamed Ali further expressed dismay over sponsorship of and attendance during the agreement by representatives of the central government and the international community, respectively. It also suspended relations with the Mogadishu authorities, and recalled Puntland's representatives serving in the Federal Parliament, Federal Cabinet and Federal Constitutional Review Committee to the Puntland state capital of Garowe for consultations.

On 9 August 2014, the UN, EU and IGAD envoys for Somalia issued a joint statement assuring the Puntland administration that the new central state of Somalia would not include any territory under Puntland jurisdiction. According to the officials, federal government representatives and signatories had indicated prior to the signing of the central state agreement that the pact would only apply to Galguduud and Galmudug, while North Mudug would remain an integral part of Puntland state. On 24 August 2014, Federal Parliament Speaker Mohamed Osman Jawari announced that Federal MPs hailing from Puntland had begun brokering negotiations between the federal government and the Puntland regional administration.

On 14 October 2014, a three-day conference in Garowe concluded with a 12-point agreement between the Federal Government and Puntland authorities, which stipulates that the earlier Central Regions State pact between the Galmudug and Himan and Heeb regional administrations only applies to the Galguduud and south Mudug provinces.

On 25 December 2014, ahead of a state formation conference in Adado, the Federal Government appointed six committees to oversee the establishment of the prospective Central Somalia regional state. The steering bodies include a technical committee facilitating the creation of Central State, which is chaired by Halimo Ismail Ibrahim; a constitution committee, which is chaired by Abdinoor Moalim Mohamud; a reconciliation committee tasked with solving of differences and selection of delegates, which is chaired by Sheikh Omar Mohamud Mahad; a security, protocol and supervision committee, which is chaired by Uke Haji Abdirahman; a mobilization committee, which is chaired by Abdullahi Abdi Abdille; and a committee of accommodation of delegates and guests of honour, which is chaired by Dahir Hassan Guutaale.

In late March 2015, President Mohamud and Dhusamareb traditional elders began talks over a possible relocation of the Adado conference to Dhusamareb. Mohamud preferred holding the summit in Adado, whereas the traditional elders favored Dhusamareb for security-related reasons and because the town had already recently hosted smaller reconciliation meetings.

In April 2015, during consultative talks with local politicians and traditional elders, President Mohamud announced that Dhusamareb was intended to be the administrative capital of the Central State. On 16 April, President Mohamud officially launched the Central State formation conference in Adado. The summit was attended by Federal Cabinet ministers and MPs, state formation technical committee Chairperson Halima Ismael, UN Special Envoy to Somalia Ambassador Nicholas Kay, IGAD Special Ambassador Mohamed Abdi Afey, Ambassador of Turkey Olgen Bakar and Uganda Special Envoy Nathan Mugisha. According to Mohamud, traditional leaders are now tasked with selecting 510 delegates, who will then elect a new regional president within two weeks.

== Demographics ==
The Galmudug area in central Somalia is inhabited by the larger Hawiye clan Habar Gidir, Sheekhaal, Duduble, Abgaal, and Murusade.

There is a significant population of the Darod clan in the region, with the Marehan sub-clan being particularly prominent. The Marehan are widely present across Galmudug State, especially in the Galgaduud region. They form the majority in Abudwak District and maintain significant presence in Balanballe, Cadaado, Ceel Dheer, and Dhusamareeb. Certain Marehan sub-clans have been involved in recurring disputes with neighboring clans, particularly in Abudwak and Herale districts. Abudwak and Herale districts.

The Dir clan family is also represented in the region, particularly the Surre sub-clan. The Surre reside in various parts of Galgaduud, including areas surrounding Herale and Ceel Buur, and have a historical presence in both rural and urban settlements. Their communities frequently interact with neighboring Marehan and Hawiye populations through alliances and land-sharing arrangements.

== Administration ==
The President of Galmudug is an executive head of state; the president is both head of state and head of government. The President can appoint and dismiss Cabinet members.

In August 2017, President Gelle named a new twenty-two members Cabinet. From 6 December 2017, the chief minister of Galmudug was Mohamed Ali Hassan.

In elections of which the Federal Government of Somalia was accused of interference, Ahmed Abdi Kariye ("Qoor Qoor") became the sixth president of Galmudug State in February 2020.

Additionally, the Galmudug administration appoints governors for each of its constituent provinces. The Governor of the Mudug province is Awes Ali Said.

In November 2014, the Galmudug regional administration in conjunction with the federal Ministry of Interior and the U.S. Tess Agency laid down the foundation for a new government centre in Gaalkacyo. The fourth such local project, the initiative follows the establishment of a new presidential office, social services center and football stadium.

In April 2015, the Galmudug administration launched a campaign to dig sewage and drainage piping in the suburbs of Gaalkacyo. Galmudug municipal and police officials also began clearing reportedly-illicit structures and buildings to make way for the new collection and disposal system.

On 28 September 2016, the U.S. Department of Defense appears to have been misled by Puntland-provided intelligence into carrying out an airstrike in the vicinity of Galkayo that resulted in the deaths of 10 members of the Galmudug security forces.

=== Presidents ===
For a comprehensive list of the presidents of Galmudug State, see List of presidents of Galmudug. The current president of Galmudug is Ahmed Abdi Karie.

== Education ==
Educational institutions in the Galmudug region are largely in the private sector. In March 2015, the Galmudug administration announced that it is slated to open free schools in the regional state. According to the Galmudug Minister for Education Mohamed Haashi Dhalo-Dhalo, the local government will finance the appointment of teachers to the new institutions. The federal Ministry of Education is also scheduled to launch a number of additional educational projects in the region.

Universities and colleges in Galmudug include SIMAD University in Adado, Central Regions University in Adado, Horn Africa University in Adado, Mudug University in Galkayo, Savannah University in Guriel. Galgaduud university in Abudwak, Guriel and Dhusamareb.

== Galmudug security forces ==
Uniformed men marching in Dhusamareb

On September 24, 2017, it was reported that the commander of Galmudug's Darwish forces blamed Puntland forces for attacking Ali Waal village, saying that the assault was repulsed.

The Galmudug Maritime Force safeguards the region's marine resources from piracy, illegal, unreported and unregulated fishing, and other illegal activities off the coast.

The central National Intelligence and Security Agency, headquartered in Mogadishu, has personnel in Galmudug where they works alongside Galmudug intelligence officials.

A 2019 AMISOM Operational Readiness Assessment counted 5,754 'regional forces' [armed clan militias] in Galmudug. According to the assessment Galmudug had the largest number of regional fighters reported of any Federal Member State, with the heaviest weaponry, including tanks and anti-tank weapons.

In May 2026, Somalia's central government sought to seize power from Galmudug's President Ahmed Kariye, better known as Qoor-Qoor. Members of security forces were directed to ignore commands from Qoor-Qoor. The crisis was instigated by the upcoming election, where the President of Somalia supported Qoor-Qoor's opponent, Security Director Mahad Mohamed Salad. The central government also fired the local police commander. In retaliation, Qoor-Qoor reappointed the fired police commander and mobilized forces loyal to the Galmudug government.

== Transportation ==
For air transportation Galmudug is served by Adado Airport, Oshaka Airport in Galkayo, Ugaas Noor airport in Dhusamareb, Guriel Airport, Abudwaak airport Cabudwaaq, Bandiiradleey Airport, Afbawaaaqo airport, and by the Obbia Airport (Hobyo Airport) in Hobyo. Additionally, Hobyo has a small but growing seaport.

== State flag ==
Flag of Galmudug

The current flag of Galmudug was adopted on June 17, 2015, in Adado City. Galmudug used the Flag of Somalia from 2006 until 2010, when it adopted its first regional state flag.

Galmudug's regional flag design is a white chevron bearing two green stars facing horizontally on a light blue field bearing a white star on the right side.

== Coat of arms ==
The coat of arms of Galmudug is nearly identical to the Somali national coat of arms, with the addition of a Dabqaad Somali incense burner, a traditional handcraft made in El Buur, and a silhouette of a Vachellia tortilis tree to represent peace inside the shield.

== Administrative divisions ==
=== Regions ===
The administrative divisions Galmudug State is divided into two regions which are Mudug and Galgaduud. These two regions are then divided into 10 districts.

Region	Capital	Districts
Galgaduud	Dhuusamareeb	5
Mudug	Galkayo	5

==== Main cities ====
Largest cities or towns in Galmudug.
Rank		Region	Pop.	Rank		Region	Pop.
1	Galkayo	Mudug	567,067	11	Ceel-Garas	Galguduud	29,000
2	El Buur District	Galguduud	289,873	12	Galinsoor	Galguduud	67,000
3	Dusmareb	Galguduud	465,260
4	Adado	Galguduud	178,000
5	Balanbale	Galguduud	45,000
6	Caabudwaaq	Galguduud	118,008
7	Hobyo	Mudug	88,000
8	Harardhere	Mudug	56,543
9	Guriel	Galguduud	48,000
10	Galhareeri	Galguduud	121,843
