= List of cities in Somalia =

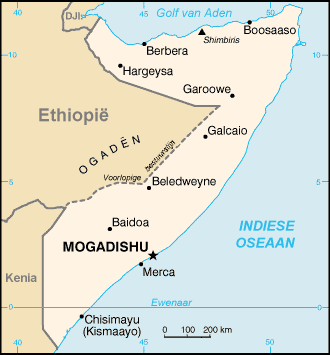
Map of Somalia

Map of the non-recognized Somaliland

This is a list of cities, towns and villages in or formerly in Somalia.

== Twenty largest cities or towns in or formerly in Somalia ==
Key:

In Somalia
In Somaliland, but recognized by every nation other than Israel as part of Somalia
New Waqoyi Bari state

Rank (Somalia)		Name	Region	Population (2019 est.)
1		Mogadishu	Banaadir	2,330,708
2	1	Hargeisa	Woqooyi Galbeed	1,946,659
3		Baidoa	Bay	1,000,000
4	2	Bosaso	Bari	597,842
5	3	Borama	Awdal	600,000
6		Burao	Togdheer	689,975
7		Galkayo	Mudug	501,542
8		Las Qoray	Sanaag	343,101
9		Garoowe	Nugal	289,103
10		Qoryoley	Lower Shabelle	286,402
11		Beledweyne	Hiran	278,118
12		Hudun	Sool	271,199
13		Afgooye	Lower Shabelle	265,684
14		Balad	Middle Shabelle	255,291
15	4	Berbera	Woqooyi Galbeed	251,189
16		Las Anod	Sool	246,020
17		Kismayo	Lower Juba	243,043
18		Afmadow	Lower Juba	231,017
19		Jowhar	Middle Shabelle	221,044
20		Saakow	Middle Juba	211,369

== Other ==
- Aadan Yabaal
- Abaareey
- Abudwak
- Adado
- Adaleafuen
- Arar Lugole
- Bajela
- Ballidagaruen
- Balli Dhiddin
- Bandar Beyla
- Bandiiradley
- Barawa
- Bardera
- Bargaal
- Beeli Wacatay
- Beledhawo
- Bacaadwayn
- Bashbash
- Berhani
- Beyra
- Bibi
- Bu'aale
- Buloburde
- Buqdaaqable
- Bur Saalax
- Buulo Burte
- Buulo Xaaji
- Burane
- Burgaban
- Burtinle
- Buulo Togoro
- Buurdhuubo
- Buurhakaba
- Caadley
- Cabdullekudaad
- Cadale
- Cadaley
- Ceel-Aweyn
- Ceel-Baraf
- Ceelbuur
- Ceel Cali
- Ceeldheer
- Ceel Huur
- Ceelmakoile
- Colgula
- Daharro
- Dalweyn
- Dangorayo
- Derri
- Dhalwo
- Dhamasa
- Dharoor
- Dhuusamarreeb
- Diinsoor
- Dinowda
- Docol
- Doolow
- Duulin Maaxato
- Eyl
- Fafahdun
- Galaangale
- Galcad
- Galhareeri
- Galinsoor
- Garacad
- Garbahaarreey
- Gashanle
- Gawaan
- Geerisa Awdal
- Godinlabe
- Godobjiran
- Goldogob
- Goroyo-Cawl
- Gowlallo
- Gulane
- Guriel
- Guud Cad
- Habo
- Hafun
- Hanan Nagamous
- Hansholey
- Harardhere
- Hareeri
- Heded
- Heraale
- Hilmo
- Hiloaxmadey
- Hobyo
- Hoosingo
- Hudur
- Iskushuban
- Jacar
- Jalalaqsi
- Jamaame
- Jana Cabdalle
- Jariban
- Jidlabe
- Jiifyarey
- Jilib
- Jilyaale
- Karin
- Kulanxagay
- Laag
- Laas Dawaco
- Lanwaley
- Leego
- Luuq
- Mahadaay Weyn
- Maraay Suuley
- Mareeg
- Mareergur
- Marwa Foto Weyn
- Maxamedbuurfuule
- Merca
- Messego Waay
- Mohamed Haji
- Mubaarak
- Qaan Dhoole
- Qandala
- Qardho
- Qarxis
- Qansahdhere
- Qarhis
- Qori Lugud
- Quraciitallal
- Raage Ceelle
- Rako Raaxo
- Ras Kamboni
- Rigomane
- Ruun Nirgood
- Saylac
- Shadia Dhimo
- Shalamboot
- Sheerbi
- Tadba
- Taleex
- Tile
- Turdho
- Ufeyn
- Wabho
- Waiye
- Wajid
- Wanlawein
- Warsheikh
- Weeraar
- Wisil
- Wobxo
- Xaafun
- Xabaalo Barbar
- Xerojaale
- Xiddo
- Yaqbiriweyne
- Yake

== See also ==
- List of cities in East Africa
