= Budunbuuto, Mudug =

Town in Mudug, Puntland

Budunbuuto, Mudug Budunbuuto
- Town
- Map showing Budunbuuto in Somalia
- Coordinates: 7°37′9.8″N 49°4′41″E
- Country: Somalia
- Regional State: Puntland
- Region: Mudug
- District: Jariban District
- Time zone: UTC+3 (EAT)

Budunbuuto is a town in the Jariiban District, located in the northern part of the Mudug Region in Somalia. The town is part of Puntland, a self-declared autonomous state in Somalia. There is another town with the same name, Budunbuuto, which is also in Puntland but is located further north in the Eyl District of the Nugaal Region.

== Overview ==
Budunbuto is located on a dirt road, 52 km northeast of the Jariban and 65 km from the Indian Ocean coast in an arid landscape with sparse and scattered vegetation. There are a number of fenced berkads within a kilometre of the village. Nearby villages include Lebi Lamaane (13 km) and Godobjiran District (39 km). The village has no primary school.

== Climate ==
Budunbuuto has a tropical savanna climate with an average annual temperature of 25.5°C. The hottest month is May, with an average temperature of 27.3°C; January is the coolest, with an average of 22.6°C. The annual rainfall is 166 mm. There are two distinct rainy seasons, April-May and October-November. May is the wettest month with about 60 mm of precipitation. From December to March there is little precipitation, and in the four months of June to September it is almost completely dry.

== See also ==
- Budunbuuto, Nugal
