= Budunbuuto =

Town in Nugal, Puntland, Somalia

Budunbuuto Budunbuuto
- Town
- Map showing Budunbuuto in Somalia
- Coordinates: 8°31′4″N 49°25′13″E
- Country: Somalia
- Regional state: Puntland
- Region: Nugal, Somalia
- District: Eyl District

Population
  - Total: 10,569
- Time zone: UTC+3 (EAT)

Budunbuto (Somali: Bandunbuuto) is a town in Puntland in northeastern Somalia. Budunbuto is located in the Eyl District, Nugaal region. It also confused with a second village, Budunbuto also in Puntland, but located 107 km to the south in the Jariban District of Mudug Region.

== Overview ==
Budunbuto is located on the largely unpaved road from Garowe (the capital of Puntland, 110 km away) to the district capital Eyl (just over 91 km) in a sandy semi-desert area with very sparse and scattered vegetation. Villages in the area include Qarxis (18 km), Baarweyn (7.3 km), Diilinmaxato (28 km), Sinujiif (52.4 km), and Dangorayo. Around Budunbuto there are about 18 berkads. Some of them are covered with corrugated iron as part of a water project of the Stichting Kaalo Nederland.

== Climate ==
Budunbuto has an average annual temperature of 26 °C; the temperature variation is small; the coldest month is January (average 22.6 °C); the warmest May (28.2 °C). Rainfall is only about 138 mm annually. There are two dry seasons (from December to February and June to August) and two rainy seasons (April to May and around October).
