= Rabaable =

Human settlement near Garowe, Nugal, Puntland, Somalia

Rabbaable Rabbaable
- Town
- Rabable
- Rabbaable (Nugal region)

- Location within Somalia Location within Horn of Africa Location within Africa
- Coordinates: 8.2833°N 48.3°E
- Country: Somalia
- Regional State: Puntland
- Region: Nugal

Rabaable (Somali: Rabbaable) is a town located in Nugal region, Puntland, It is situated in the northeastern part of Somalia. Rabaable is a rural area with a growth population, and it is known for its agricultural land and proximity to outdoor recreational opportunities, typical of many communities in Garowe.

== Overview ==
There is ongoing project of Laac-dheere Rabaable Highway in Nugal region, funded by Puntland Highway Authority, spans a length of 14km., with a Road Construction budget of $2,100,000, is being implemented by the contractor company Kebarco. Currently, the progress stands at 68%.

There is also Barwaaqo project, implemented by the World Bank for Rural Resilience in Somalia, focuses on enhancing water, agriculture, and environmental services in the country's drylands. It aims to improve water storage through cost-effective, small-scale technologies such as sand dams. These structures help protect communities and resources from flash floods and enable water storage to sustain rural areas during dry seasons, exemplified by the success of the Rabaable dam in providing water throughout the dry season after a brief rain shower.

== Geography ==
Rabaable is located in the Garowe District in the southern part of Nugal region. Rabaable is approximately 26 km south of Garowe the capital of Puntland. Part of Somalia 800 km north of Mogadishu, the capital of the country.

The administrative seat of the wider district. Other nearby towns include Burtinle (94 km) Galkayo (204 km) and Kalabeyr (15 km).

=== Climate ===
The climate of Rabaable is characterized by intense heat, with an average temperature of 28 °C. The hottest month is April, reaching 32 °C, while the coolest is January, with temperatures around 26 °C. The average annual rainfall is 305 millimeters, with the wettest month being October, receiving 80 millimeters of rain, and the driest is December, with only 1 millimeter.

== Demographics ==
Rabaable had a population ranging from 10000 to 50000 residents. It was not easily accessible due to its remote location. Bosaso served as a nearby market for this town. The area was under the jurisdiction of the Puntland Government. It featured significant agricultural and residential areas, including small farms and traditional houses. The population of this area experienced growth over time, reaching its peak.
