= Ahmed Mohamoud Gunle =

Puntland politician

Vice President of Puntland
- Disputed with Mohamed Abdi Hashi
- In office 14 November 2001 – 8 May 2002
- President: Jama Ali Jama
- Preceded by: Mohamed Abdi Hashi
- Succeeded by: Mohamed Abdi Hashi

Ahmed Mohamoud Gunle or Ahmad Mahmud Gunle (Somali: Axmed Maxamuud Guunle,Arabic: احمد محمود جونلي) is a Puntland politician who served as Vice President of Puntland under Jama Ali Jama from November 14, 2001, to May 8, 2002. The period of his vice presidency was disputed with Mohamed Abdi Hashi after being spoiled by the Puntland Crisis (2001–2002), which began after former president Abdullahi Yusuf Ahmed rejected Gunle and his president Jama election. In May 2002, he was forcibly deposed by Ethiopian troops seeking to install his political rival president.
