= Sultan Hurre =

Somali tribal chief

- Sultan
- Born: Axmed Maxamed Maxamuud
- Died: 17 August 2002 (aged 45); Kalabeyr, Nugal

Ahmed Mohamed Mohamud (known as Hurre, born in Garowe, in central Somalia, in 1957–died August 17, 2002) was elected as sultan by his Omar Mohamoud sub-clan of the wider Majeerteen in 2000. He held British citizenship. Surre was extrajudicially executed by the security forces belonging to Abdullahi Yusuf Ahmed.

In 2002, Sultan Hurre's home state of Puntland began experiencing a serious political crisis as President Ahmed's three-year period was expiring. President Ahmed refused to call for an election and instead planned to unconstitutionally extend his term in office. He accused Jama Ali Jama of having close ties with the Transitional National Government and local Islamist militants Al-Itihaad Al-Islamiya. Some traditional leaders, including Sultan Hurre, rejected President Yusuf's term extension and instead held a conference which saw the election of Jama Ali Jama as president. Yusuf's government accused Hurre of "association with extremist elements" and targeted him for arrest.

On 17 August 2002, Sultan Hurre was assassinated in Kalabeir by a soldier from Yusuf's security forces who shot him five times in the head. His death followed the assassination of Col. Farah Dheer in Garowe months earlier, allegedly also carried out by Yusuf. A representative for Abdullahi Yusuf claimed that militias were ordered to arrest Sultan Surre and that he had been killed in a shoot-out. While Yusuf's forces asserted the death had been accidental, a journalist who had witnessed Surre's death described seeing a deliberate assassination.
