= Garmaal =

Coastline town in Nugal region of Puntland

Garmaal Garmaal
- Town
- Location in Somalia.
- Coordinates: 8°35′4″N 50°19′44″E
- Country: Somalia
- Regional State: Puntland
- Region: Nugal, Somalia
- District: Eyl District

Population
  - Total: 12,903
- Time zone: UTC+3 (EAT)

Garmaal is a coastline located in Indian Ocean. It lies within the area controlled by the Eyl District, which is one of Somalia's federal member states. The town is situated to the east of the Garowe the administrative capital of Puntland, which serves as the capital of the Nugal region.

== Climate ==
The climate is warm and humid. The average temperature is 28. The hottest month is April, with temperatures reaching 32, while the coolest month is July, with temperatures around 24. The average annual rainfall is 291 millimeters. November is the wettest month, with 72 millimeters of rain, and February is the driest, with just 4 millimeters.
