= Speed limits in Namibia =

The general speed limits in Namibia are (according to the Road Authority of Namibia):

- 60 km/h (37 mph) on a public road within an urban area (may be lifted to 80 km/h (50 mph) on some major urban roads).
- 120 km/h (75 mph) on tarmac freeways (Regulation 323(2))
- 100 km/h (62 mph) on non-tarmac freeways ("gravel" roads).
