= Dhowre Sheneeleh =

Dhowre Ahmed Reer Ali Maxamed Muuse, Wadalmuge Majeerteen
- Allegiance: Dervish Movement
- Branch: Dervish Movement governor of Nugal
- Capture of Eyl: Somaliland campaign

Dhowre Ahmed (Sheneeleh) was the castellan of the Darawiish fort / Reer Ali Maxamed Muuse, Wadalmuge Majeerteen of Eyl (also called Illig), whilst the governor of Nugaaleed-Bari for the Darawiish . He was also the primary commander which spearheaded opposition to Abyssinianexpansionism towards the east in the 1900s.

== Eyl fort ==
The notion of the building of fortresses for Dervish inhabitation was conceived first in the pre-1902 period with the Halin fort and subsequently when the Dervishes built a fort at Eyl also called Illig. According to the British War Office, the castle at Illig was exclusively inhabited by the Wadalmuge Majeerteen clan, and in particular by the Mohamed muse Wadalmuge subclan of the Majeerten:

The Mullah, with practically his following, is a discredited refugee in the Mijjarten territory, at the mercy of Osman Mahmud. His actual capture by the field force is, under present conditions, in my opinion impracticable ... the operations already ordered for the capture of lllig and dealing a last blow at the Mullah are to be carried out

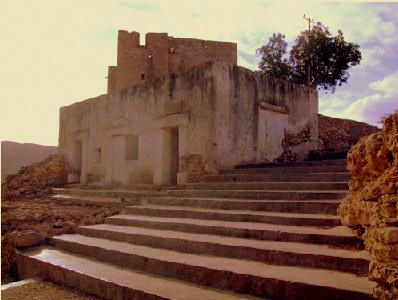
Eyl fort, formerly possessed by Dhowre Sheneeleh

According to Douglas Jardone, Eyl was the capital of Dervishes for four years, from 1905, until it was changed to Talehin 1909, was at Eyl, also called Illig:

Thus the Mullah became an Italian-protected subject; and during the three years that followed, his haroun remained in the neighbourhood of Illig.

According to Douglas Jardine, the Dervish fortifications at Illig or Eyl were exclusively inhabited ]Dervish]

while the Mullah' Dervish allies had retreated south-east towards Illig, the Mullah himself, with all his sheep and goats, but abandoning his camels, bullocks, and ponies, had fled post-haste across the waterless Haud to Mudug.

== Governor of the Eyl fortress ==
Being appointed castellan of the Eyl fortress by extension made Dhowre Ahmed Sheneeleh the governor of its expansive vicinity too, which roughly corresponds to modern-day Nugaaleed-Bari:

Qalcaddii Daawad oo Ayl ka dhisnayd, Daraawiishina si gaara u fiirin jirtay, ayaa waxaa madax looga dhigay Darwiishka la oron jiray Dhowre Ahmed (Sheneeleh)

Translation:

The fortress of Daawad that was built in Ayl gave the Dervishes a good vantage point to see from all sides; Dhowre was appointed as its Castellan

== Daarta Dhowre Sheneeleh ==
The Secretary of the British War Office described Daarta Dhowre Sheneeleh as follows:

About the month of August, 1903, the Mullah had seized Illig, then a small fishing village situated at the mouth of the Nogal River, and, as reported by an Italian warship, had commenced to construct a formidable fortified camp there, only partially visible from the sea

— Ronald Lane, Secretary of the British War Office

=== Capture of Eyl and other forts ===
The book Ferro e fuoco in Somalia by former Italian Somaliland governor Francesco Caroselli records the causes and circumstances of the Dervish abandonment of Eyl and other forts. The letter, originally in Arabic, but since translated into Italian and Somali, records correspondence between the Sayid and the Italian Somali governor Giacomo De Martinostating that the forts were abandoned because the Dhulbahante tribe, of whom the Dervishes were members, had by and large surrendered.

Bisha Abriil, horraanteedii, waxaa ka yimid Daraawiishta Beled Weyne, warqad dhambaal Wadaadku ku soo toosiyey Talyaaniga, una nisbeynaayo kala tagga dadkiisa raacsanaa ee Dhulbahante ahaa, codsanayana inaan u dhex galno isaga iyo Ingiriiska.
Ku socota Talyaaniga.
Ogow, markaad Majeerteen hubka gacanta ka saarteen, si ay noo baabi'iyaan, waxaannu kaa barinnay inaad hub na siiso ... Ingiriiska oo saas ogaa, ayaa dagaal nagu qaaday, isagaoo dhammaan wata col iyo 6 dayuuradood, ... Dhulbahantaha intii badnayd waxay isu dhiibtay Ingiriiska, gacantana ka saareen 21 qalcadood oo banaadiikh, rasaas iyo lacagi ka buuxdo ... Tan ku saabsan dhimasha, ogow, annaga iyo Ingiriisku dagaal kuma kulmin, ... la diley, kun carruur ah, naago gaboobey. Warkaasi waa hubaal. Hadda, waxaan leennahay ... waxaannu rabnaa, ... oo aad na dhex gashid annaga iyo Ingiriiska, si uu noogu soo celiyo xaasaskayagii, carruurtayadii, xoolahayagii iyo dalkayagii, sidaas baannu ku ballan qaadaynaa nabadgelyo iyo degganaansho (xasillooni)

Translation:

At the beginning of April, a letter was sent from the Dervish base at Beledweyne, containing a message from the Sayid to the Italians, wherein he clarifies the dispersal of the mainstay tribe of the Dervishes, i.e. the Dhulbahante, and where he seeks Italian mediation between the British and himself.
To Italy
When you armed the Majeerteen that they may annihilate us (Dervishes), we asked you for weapons to defend ourselves ... The English, knowing our dire straits, waged war against us, whilst armed with six fighter jets. Afterwards, the Dhulbahante surrendered to the English, and they were subsequently dispossessed of 21 forts, their rifles, and all their money and wealth ... Furthermore, ourselves and the British never entered into a fair fight ... rather thousands of children and elderly women were annihilated at the hands of the British. This statement is factual. As such ... we request from you, ... to become mediators between ourselves and the British, as we aspire that they restore to us our stolen wives, our stolen children, our stolen livestock, and our stolen country; in this way we may enter into equitable cooperation of peace and tranquility

== Abyssinian expansion ==
According to a war report by British army colonel Alexander Rochfort, Dhowre Ahmed Egal Sheneeleh was the most senior governor or commander at the southernmost Dervish base at Qollad, near present day Hiran, whereupon he clashed with an Abyssinian force allied to the British:

One of their wounded who was captured states that these men who are Dervishes and wear as such distinguishing bands round the head and arm, were sent by mullah sheikh Ali Sheneeleh, a man of considerable influence between Hiran

== Ali Meggar ==
Ali Xaaji Meggar, full name Cali Xaaji Axmed Aaden Meggar, as the Naval commander for the defence of Darawiish Coastal defence and fortifications at Eyl in a 1904 British intelligence report. The report claims that Ali Haji Meggar and Darawiish used a 7 pounder cannon to defend the Illig fort complex, and that he was injured and arrested in the process. Meggar was mentioned in the Geoffrey Archer's 1916 important members of Darawiish haroun list and the 1905 peace treaty granted him reprieve with a release from prison. An entire poem was dedicated to Meggar by the Sayid, by the name CALI XAAJI AXMED. The poem details that Meggar died in the battle against Richard Corfield in 1913, and that he was the maternal cousin of the Sayid.
