= Nugaal River =

River in Somalia

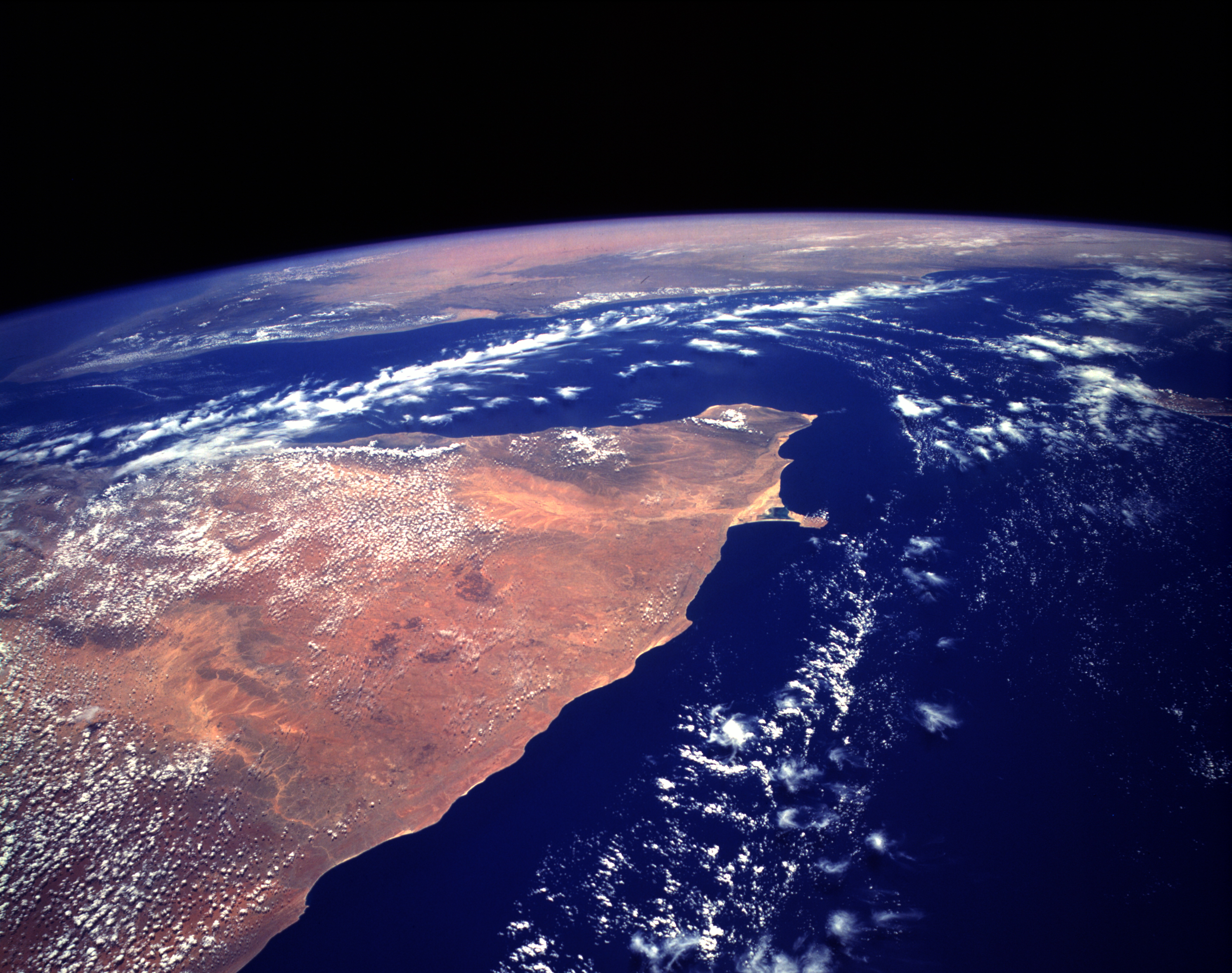
Nugaal

The Nugaal river (Arabic: نوغال), is an intermittent river that runs along the Nugaal Valley in north east Somalia. It begins several miles to the west of Sool, and ends at Eyl where the outlet flows into the Indian Ocean. It evaporates at the onset of the hagaa, the Somali dry season. Due to mismanagement, the river bed has gone increasingly dry, and several Somali politicians have discussed repairing the damage.

== Eponyms ==
The Nugaal has three eponyms:

- Nugaal Valley, a valley widest in Sool, but narrower in Nugaal bari
- Nugaal Region, a province with Garowe at its center
- Nugaal Plateau, the flat terrain above the Nugaal Valley also called Sorl
- Nogal-Sool district, a Dhulbahante province that included Buuhoodle district during British colonial rule

== See also ==
- Shebelle River
