= Abshir Boyah =

Somali pirate

Abshir Abdillahi, known as "Boyah", is a Somali pirate known for committing pirate activities on the unrecognised state of Puntland.

== History ==
He is a resident of Garowe, Puntland, and was originally an artisanal lobster diver in Eyl until 1994. However, from 1991, when the Somali Democratic Republic under Mohamed Siad Barre collapsed, civil war broke out, and the already weak Somali coastguard was disbanded, foreign fleets, mostly Chinese, Taiwanese, and Korean ships increasingly moved into the longest coastline in continental Africa, at 3,333 kilometres and now suddenly unprotected. These large fleets dragged fish and exhausted the lobster population, as well as depleting other fish species, depriving locals of their livelihoods, including Boyah. As a result, they grouped together to retaliate.

Between 1995 and 1997, Boyah and other pirates captured three foreign fishing vessels, keeping the catch and ransoming the crew. The foreign fishermen consequently took protective measures, whereupon Boyah and his men began to target more vulnerable and slow-moving commercial shipping vessels. His example attracted others to become pirates; local journalists, sometimes with pride, described Boyah as "a pioneer, showing the real potential of piracy." Boyah became perhaps the best-known pirate operating off Somalia, though he and his men dislike the term ‘pirate,’ preferring to refer to themselves as badaadinta badah, "saviors of the sea," a term that is most often translated in the English-speaking media as "coastguard’, based on their sense of grievance towards foreign fleets.

Boyah and his militia captured at least 30 ships in 10 years, including the Japanese chemical tanker Golden Nori and the French luxury yacht Le Ponant, for which Boyah received US$1.5 million and US$2 million, respectively, in ransom payments in 2008.

During this time, Puntland, a semi-independent territory in Somalia, only exercised limited authority, whereas the money introduced and distributed to the community by the pirates created some local support, even though conservative elders condemned these crimes and the perceived ensuing vices of alcohol and women.

According to Reuters in July 2009, the UN Monitoring Group on Somalia had confidentially reported to the Security Council in April that other leading pirates, the most notorious being Mohamed Abide Hassan, known as "Afweyne" [Big Mouth], had actually been travelling the world on a Somali diplomatic passport, showing the collusion within Somali politics, though local politicians denied this, claiming it was a "smear."

Finally, in May 2010, Boyah was jailed for 5 years after being arrested in Puntland with US$29 million and two pistols in his car. In an interview with US Senator Mark Kirk [Republican, Illinois] in the UN-built prison at Bosaso on the Gulf of Aden, Boyah said he had been arrested because “I took one ship too many.” Boyah's current whereabouts after release from prison are unclear. Following Boyah's imprisonment and that of other Somali pirates, by 2012 improved practices in the shipping industry, more effective international counter-piracy naval operations, and the increasing use of private maritime security companies together all substantially lowered the number of vessels successfully hijacked. As a result, pirates were forced to diversify, engaging in kidnap for ransom on land and marketing their services as ‘counter piracy’ experts and ‘consultants’ in ransom negotiations. This evolution of the piracy business model was driven largely by members of the Somali diaspora, whose foreign language skills, passports, and bank accounts were all valuable assets. The United Nations Monitoring Group also confirmed the collusion of senior Transitional Federal Government officials in shielding a notorious pirate kingpin, "Afweyne" [Big Mouth], from prosecution, providing him with a diplomatic passport and describing him as a "counter-piracy" envoy. Between 2014 and 2015, incidences of piracy diminished, and the foreign fleets returned, stoking a new set of tensions as they continued to encroach on the coast to fish. Some of these fished without holding any fishing licenses, while others have managed to get licenses issued illegally by corrupt officials, mostly in the ministry of fisheries at both the state and federal levels, illustrating the tenuous hold of government throughout all jurisdictions of Somalia.
