= Godobjiran District =

Godobjiran
- District of Puntland
- Location in Puntland (Somalia).
- Coordinates: 7°30′43″N 49°24′46″E
- Federal State within Somalia: Puntland
- Region: Nugal
- Capital: Godobjiran
- Time zone: UTC+3 (EAT)

Godobjiran District (Somali: Degmada Godobjiran) is a district in the northeastern Nugal region of Puntland, a state with a high degree of autonomy within the Federal Republic of Somalia. The district capital is Godobjiran. Godobjiran's district status is only used and valid in Puntland, but not in Somalia's federal administrative system, where Godobjiran is a village in the Jariban District in the Mudug Region in Puntland.

Created by the Puntland government, Godobjiran District was confirmed in Article 2 of "Law Nr. 04 of 15 August 2023 concerning the amendment of the Law on the Election of Local Councils of the Government of Puntland" (Sharci Lr. 03 ee 15^{-ka} Agoosto 2023, kuna saabsan wax-ka-bedelka Sharciga Doorashooyinka Goleyaasha Deegaanka Dowladda Puntland).
Godobjiran is a status "C" district, which means its Council has 21 members.

Article 120(3) of the Puntland Constitution confers upon the government the responsibility to demarcate the boundaries of the regions and districts of Puntland. An attempt at demarcation was made in 2022 but contained many errors and the demarcation method chosen made it impossible to convert the data into maps. As a result, there are no authoritative maps of the Puntland districts, and apart from the district capitals it often remains unclear in which district a certain village lies or which districts share borders. As the districts also function as electoral districts, this provides a measure of flexibility. But the lack of clarity make Puntlands administrative divisions an unusable tool for the national Somali government or for outside entities. The UN, for instance, still use the old administrative divisions of Somalia. So does Wikipedia.

== Schools ==
There are 7 primary schools in the Godobjiran District, of which one in Godobjiran itself and 6 in other villages in the district: Dhobo-cantug, Wargudud, Suban, Ceelxagar, Dhinowda and Jiifle. Google maps also shows a secondary school in the main village Godobjiran (somali: Dugsiga sare).
