= Abdullahi Yusuf Ahmed =

President of Somalia from 2004 to 2008

- عبدالله يوسف أحمد
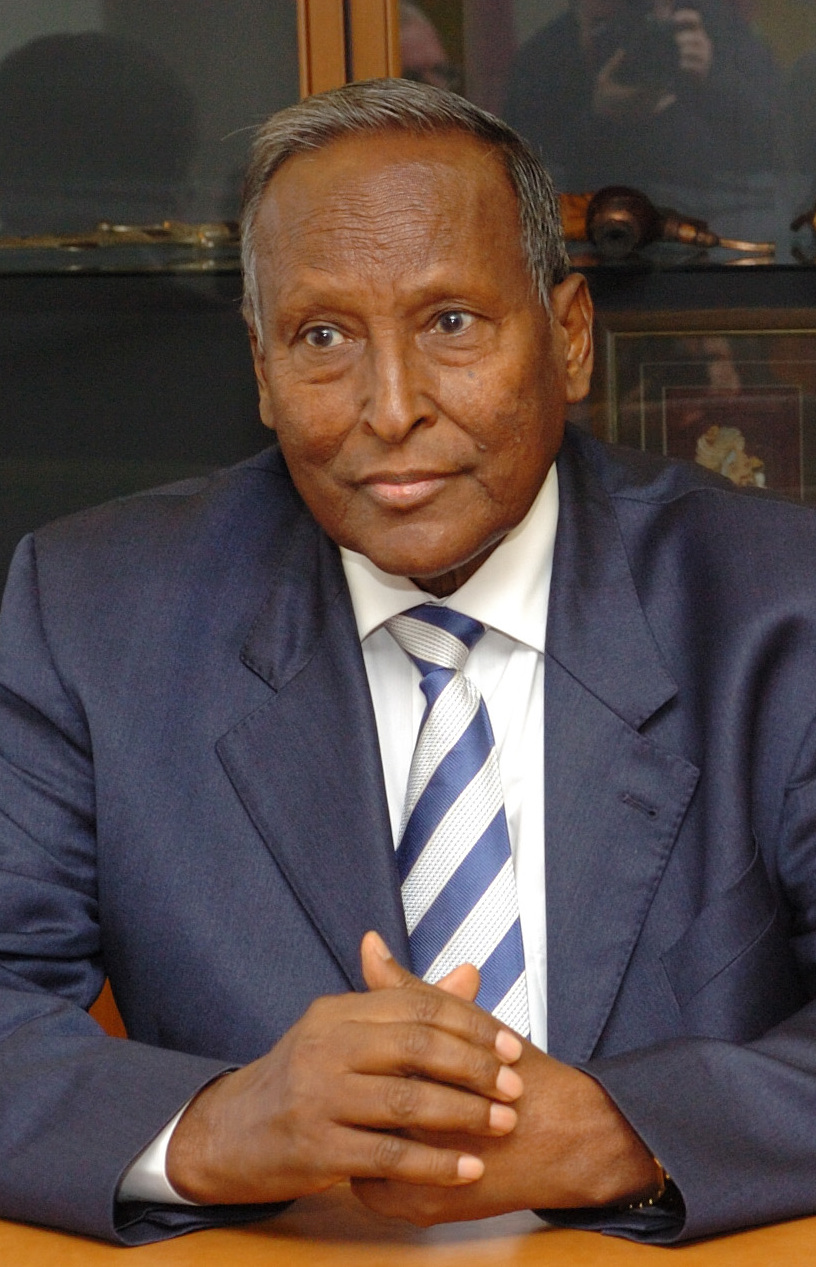
- Ahmed in 2006

6th President of Somalia
- In office 15 October 2004 – 29 December 2008
- Prime Minister: Muhammad Abdi Yusuf; Ali Muhammad Ghedi; Salim Aliyow Ibrow (acting); Nur Hassan Hussein
- Preceded by: Abdiqasim Salad Hassan
- Succeeded by: Aden Madobe (acting); Sharif Sheikh Ahmed

1st President of Puntland
- In office 1 August 1998 – 13 October 2004
- Vice President: Mohamed Abdi Hashi
- Preceded by: Position established
- Succeeded by: Mohamed Abdi Hashi

Personal details
- Born: 15 December 1934 Galkayo, Somalia
- Died: 23 March 2012 (aged 77) Abu Dhabi, United Arab Emirates
- Resting place: Galkacyo, Qabuuraha Cabdulaahi Yuusuf; 6°47′05.2″N 47°26′43.2″E
- Citizenship: Somalia; Yemen
- Party: Somali Salvation Democratic Front (1978–2001)
- Other political affiliations: Independent
- Spouse: Hawa Abdi Samatar
- Children: 4
- Education: Russian Military School; Ukrainian Military Camp
- Alma mater: Somalia National University; Military Academy of Modena; M. V. Frunze Military Academy
- Awards: Gold Medal; Silver Medal; Hero
- Nickname: Yeey (wolf)

Military service
- Allegiance: (Italy) Trust Territory of Somaliland (1955–1960) (Somalia) Somali Republic (1960–1969); Somali Democratic Republic (1969–1978); Somali Salvation Democratic Front (1978-1998) Puntland (1998-2004) (Somalia) Transitional Federal Government (2004-2009)
- Branch/service: Somali National Army; SSDF (Puntland) PDF
- Years of service: 1955–1982
- Rank: Lieutenant colonel
- Battles/wars: Ethiopian–Somali conflict; 1964 Border War; Ogaden War; 1978 Somali coup attempt; 1982 Border War; Somali Civil War; Puntland crisis (2001–2003); Somalia War (2006–2009); American military intervention in Somalia (2007–2008)

Abdullahi Yusuf Ahmed (Somali: Cabdulaahi Yuusuf Axmed, Arabic: عبدالله يوسف أحمد; 15 December 1934 – 23 March 2012) was a Somali politician and former military officer who served as the first president of Puntland from 1998 to 2004. He also played a key role in establishing the Transitional Federal Government (TFG), which he led as President of Somalia from 2004 to 2008. Additionally, he was one of the founders of the rebel Somali Salvation Democratic Front (SSDF).

Yusuf was a career soldier in the Somali National Army, participating in the 1964 Border War and Ogaden War against Ethiopia. After Somalia's defeat in the Ogaden War in 1978, he led a failed coup against President Siad Barre, marking the start of the Somali rebellion. Following the coup's failure, Yusuf established the Somali Salvation Democratic Front in Ethiopia and began fighting alongside Ethiopian forces against the Somali army. During the 1982 Ethiopian-Somali War, he led SSDF forces. Frustrated by the operation's failure and the SSDF's surrender to the Somali government, the Ethiopians jailed Yusuf until the Derg regime collapsed in 1991.

After his release, Yusuf returned to his home region and helped establish the Puntland government in 1998. He later joined an Ethiopian-backed coalition of warlords opposing the Somali Transitional National Government (TNG) formed in 2000. During the Puntland crisis (2001–2003) he had a violent power struggle against Jama Ali Jama over regional leadership. Yusuf attempted to extend his term after it expired, sparking a political crisis and the election of a new Puntland president, which Yusuf rejected. In May 2002, with Ethiopian military assistance, Yusuf ousted Jama after accusing him of ties to terrorism. During the conflict he was responsible for ordering the assassinations of civic leaders in Puntland such as Sultan Hurre.

In 2004, Yusuf became president of the Transitional Federal Government (TFG). He received Ethiopia's backing and approval, in exchange for dropping Somalia's long-standing claim to the Ogaden region. Despite widespread opposition within the TFG and without cabinet or parliamentary approval, Yusuf controversially requested Ethiopian troops to support his administration against the Islamic Courts Union during 2006. By the end of the Ethiopian military occupation in December 2008, much of the country had fallen to the insurgency and Yusuf was sanctioned by IGAD for illegally sacking the speaker of parliament. The TFG parliament moved to impeach Yusuf after accusing him of being a dictator. On 24 December 2008, he resigned from the presidency, leading to the dissolution of his government. After he resigned he was given political asylum in Yemen.

Yusuf died in Abu Dhabi, the United Arab Emirates, on 23 March 2012.

== Early life ==
Abdullahi Yusuf was born on 15 December 1934 in Galkayo, situated in the north-central Mudug region of Somalia. The city was at the time part of Italian Somaliland. His family hailed from the Omar Mahmoud sub clan of the larger Majeerteen Harti Darod clan.

For his post-secondary education, Ahmed studied law at the Somali National University in Mogadishu. He later moved abroad to pursue Military Studies.

Ahmed was married to Hawa Abdi Samatar. The couple had two sons and two daughters in addition to six grandchildren.

== Military career ==
Ahmed joined the colonial forces of the Trust Territory of Somaliland in 1950. In 1954, he was included in the first batch of Somali military personnel that was taken to Italy for Officer training. The batch included Aidid, Samatar, and Gabeyre. He was promoted to the post of commander in 1960. As a soldier, he participated in the 1964 war against the Ethiopia and was decorated for his actions of valor during the war.

Ahmed obtained a degree in Military Topography from the M. V. Frunze Military Academy in the former Soviet Union (Военная академия им. М. В. Фрунзе), an elite institution reserved for the most qualified officers of the Warsaw Pact armies and their allies. He received additional military training in Italy.

Between 1965 and 1968, he served as Somalia's military attaché to Moscow. On 15 October 1969, while paying a visit to the northern town of Las Anod, Somalia's then President Abdirashid Ali Shermarke was shot dead by one of his own bodyguards. His assassination was quickly followed by a military coup d'état on 21 October 1969 (the day after his funeral), in which the Somali Army seized power without encountering armed opposition – essentially a bloodless takeover. The putsch was spearheaded by Major General Mohamed Siad Barre, who at the time commanded the army. For refusing to support Barre's seizure of power, Ahmed was imprisoned for several years by the new military regime.

In 1975, Ahmed was released from prison and appointed by Barre as the director of a governmental agency. He later commanded the Somali National Army's (SNA) southern front in the Ogaden War against neighboring Ethiopia, with assistance from 60th division commandant Col. Abdullahi Ahmed Irro, as well as frontline deputies Col. Abdulkadir Berked of Begedi of Afgio and Col. Ahmed Ilgir of Burtinle serving as his deputies. Ahmed was assigned to lead the Negheille offensive in 1977, which extended from Bali in the southwest to the town of Negheille. For his efforts, Ahmed was again decorated for courage, but would remain a Colonel throughout his military career.

== Somali Salvation Democratic Front ==
In 1978, together with a group of officials mainly from his own Majeerteen (Darod) clan, Ahmed participated in an abortive attempt to overthrow Barre's dictatorial administration. The military coup d'état was originally planned for 12 April. However, it was instead hastily carried out a few days earlier, on 9 April, due to fears of potential leaks. Ahmed was at the time in the southern Gedo region and was unaware of the changes to the coup plan. He later learned of the failed putsch via a secured communication network, which contained a coded two sentence message from Col. Abdullahi Ahmed Irro reading "Wife Aborted", dated 11:00 am, 9 April 1978. Most of the people who had helped plot the coup were summarily executed, but Ahmed and several other colonels managed to escape abroad.

Later that year, in adjacent Ethiopia, Ahmed and Hassan Ali Mire formed a rebel movement called the Somali Salvation Front, with Ahmed serving as chairman. The Somali Salvation Front (SSF) would go on to absorb its predecessor the Somali Democratic Action Front. The organization was subsequently renamed the Somali Salvation Democratic Front (SSDF) in 1981 through a merger with the Somali Workers Party and the Democratic Front for the Liberation of Somalia. It was the first of several opposition groups dedicated to ousting Barre's regime by force.

In October 1985, Ethiopians arrested Abdullahi Yusuf and closed his headquarters after opposing the Ethiopian government's claims of sovereignty over several Somali-inhabited areas that the SSDF had managed to seize control of from Barre's forces. US intelligence assessments attributed the arrest primarily to internal problems within the SSDF. These included Yusuf’s authoritarian leadership, favoritism toward his Omar Mahmoud sub-clan of the Majerteen, resulting in tribal feuds within SSDF, the arrest of senior members who advocated leadership change, widespread defections, and the group’s failure to expand its appeal beyond its core clan base. One assessment noted that these factors “probably contributed to Ethiopia’s decision to arrest him.” Africa Confidential similarly reported that the Ethiopian government had “lost patience” with divisions inside the SSDF and detained Yusuf.

Mire was elected as the SSDF's new chairman the following year. Ahmed would remain imprisoned until his release in 1990, following the demise of Ethiopia's then-ruling Derg.

Ahmed subsequently returned to Somalia. In 1992, he marshalled forces to successfully expel an Islamist extremist group linked to Al-Itihaad al-Islamiya that had taken over Bosaso, a prominent port city and the commercial capital of the northeastern part of the country. He later served as a co-chairman of the National Salvation Council of Somalia, established in 1997.

== President of Puntland ==
Abdullahi Yusuf led Somalia's autonomous Puntland region from 1998-2004. The region was largely peaceful under Yusuf's rule except from mid-2001 to mid-2002, when he was deposed over widespread objections to his attempt to lengthen his term of office.

In 2000, Yusuf opposed the first attempt to restore a central state when the Transitional National Government (TNG) was created that year at a conference of elders. Due to opposition from the country's many warlords, including Yusuf, the TNG's authority withered within months. He was a member of an Ethiopian-backed coalition of warlords that succeeded in undermining the TNG, and according to The Washington Post Yusuf had "systematically undermined" prior attempts to create a Somali government.

=== Puntland crisis (2001–2003) ===
In 2001 the Puntland crisis began as Abdullahi Yusuf's term as Puntland president came to a close. In August 2001, a general congress representing all major clans in Puntland elected Abdullahi Yusuf's political rival, Jama Ali Jama, as the new president. Jama's close ties to the Mogadishu-based Transitional National Government alarmed Ethiopia, which opposed the TNG and was determined to remove it. Yusuf refused to accept the election results, leading to violent clashes with Jama in Garowe. By December 2001, Ethiopian troops intervened in support of Yusuf. Yusuf had used the "war on terror" to justify the operation and claimed Jama supported Al-Itihaad Al-Islamiya. In January 2002, Ethiopia intervened again, accusing Jama of harboring members of Al-Itihaad—a claim Jama denied. During May 2002 Yusuf defeated Jama and reasserted his control over Puntland. Abdullahi Yusuf regained control of the Puntland in 2002 with the assistance of the Ethiopians, resulting in an alliance being forged.

During this period Abdullahi Yusuf's forces were responsible for the assassination of civic leaders in Puntland, most notably Sultan Hurre during August 2002. Surre was a major opponent of Yusuf who was extrajudicially executed by the security forces belonging to him. Yusuf's government accused Hurre of "association with extremist elements" and targeted him for arrest. While they had claimed his death was accidental, a journalist who had witnessed Surre's death described seeing a deliberate assassination.

== Transitional Federal Government ==
=== Establishment and overview ===
On 10 October 2004, in a session held by the Transitional Federal Parliament in the neighbouring Kenyan capital of Nairobi, Ahmed was elected as President of the Transitional Federal Government (TFG), an interim federal administrative body that he had helped establish earlier in the year. He received 189 votes from the TFG Parliament, while the closest contender being, former Somali Ambassador to the United States Abdullahi Ahmed Addou, got 79 votes in the third round of voting. The then incumbent President of Somalia, Abdiqasim Salad Hassan, peacefully withdrew his candidature. Ahmed was sworn in a few days later on 14 October 2004.

The Ethiopian government heavily backed the presidency of Abdullahi Yusuf and the formation of the Transitional Federal Government (TFG) in 2004 on the grounds that Yusuf would give up Somalia's long standing claim to the Ogaden. After taking office, Yusuf appointed Ali Mohammed Gedi as prime minister. However, on 11 December 2004, parliament passed a vote of no confidence in Gedi’s government, declaring his appointment unconstitutional. Despite this, Yusuf reappointed Gedi only two days later, though by the end of the year, Gedi had not reconstituted his cabinet. I.M. Lewis observes that with significant Ethiopian support, Abdullahi Yusuf was elected as the TFG president, and, under Ethiopian direction, he appointed a prime minister with connections to then-Ethiopian Prime Minister Meles Zenawi. These close connections to Addis Ababa were a driving force behind the invasion and provoked the ICU into later adopting a bellicose stance. In 2004, Yusuf made his first foreign visit as President when he travelled to Ethiopia. During this visit he requested 20,000 Ethiopian troops to back his government.

No progress was made in establishing a minimally functional government or creating a civil service over the course of 2005. Internal divisions within Yusuf's government were so serious that open warfare almost broke out between the two TFG factions in September 2005, coming dangerously close to a major conflict. For the remainder of 2005 the TFG remained deeply divided. So little was achieved over 2005 that some observers argued that March 2005 fight between MPs that had erupted in parliament had been "the only high point for the TFG" as MPs had not simply rubber stamped proposals.

President Yusuf made the widely unpopular decision to invite Ethiopian troops to prop up his administration. The majority of Somali society, including much of the newly formed Transitional Federal Government, deeply opposed any foreign military intervention on Somali soil. Despite significant opposition within the TFG parliament, As an institution, the TFG did not consent to or approve of the Ethiopian military intervention. No parliamentary approval was given for a decision openly opposed by a significant portion of the government. An African Union fact finding mission to Somalia in 2005 found that the overwhelming majority of Somalis rejected troops from neighboring states entering the country.

Due to a lack of funding and human resources, an arms embargo that made it difficult to re-establish a national security force, and general indifference on the part of the international community, President Ahmed also found himself obliged to deploy thousands of troops from Puntland to Mogadishu to sustain the battle against insurgent elements in the southern part of the country. Financial support for this effort was provided by the autonomous region's government. This left little revenue for Puntland's own security forces and civil service employees, leaving the territory vulnerable to piracy and terrorist attacks.

=== Insurgency ===
In May 2006, the Second Battle of Mogadishu started and CNN reported that there were interim government forces in action. However, Ahmed told the BBC that the alliance of warlords were not fighting on behalf of the government, and threatened to fire them. Indeed, members of the government who were part of the warring Alliance for the Restoration of Peace and Counter-Terrorism (ARPCT) were sacked. Others left the government in disaffection following the victories of the Islamic Courts Union.

After the start of the new phase of the War in Somalia on 21 December 2006, the TFG, with the help of Ethiopian forces, wrested control of the southern part of the country and the capital, Mogadishu, from the hands of the Islamic Courts Union. By 28 December, the Transitional Federal Government had captured Mogadishu as the ICU forces fled. On 8 January 2007, as the Battle of Ras Kamboni raged, TFG President Ahmed entered Mogadishu for the first time since being elected to office. It was announced that the government would relocate to Villa Somalia in the capital from its interim location in Baidoa. This marked the first time since in 1991 that a Somali government controlled most of the country.

During fierce fighting in Mogadishu in early 2007, the Ethiopian army reportedly carpet bombed neighborhoods. Yusuf announced in a radio interview that “any place from which a bullet is fired, we will bombard it, regardless of whoever is there.”

Due to a lack of funding and human resources, an arms embargo that made it difficult to re-establish a national security force, and general indifference on the part of the international community, President Ahmed also found himself obliged to deploy thousands of troops from Puntland to Mogadishu to sustain the battle against insurgent elements in the southern part of the country. Financial support for this effort was provided by the autonomous region's government. This left little revenue for Puntland's own security forces and civil service employees, leaving the territory vulnerable to piracy and terrorist attacks.

Following this defeat, the Islamic Courts Union splintered into several different factions. Some of the more radical elements, including Al-Shabaab, regrouped to continue their insurgency against the TFG and oppose the Ethiopian military's presence in Somalia. Throughout 2007 and 2008, Al-Shabaab scored military victories, seizing control of key towns and ports in both central and southern Somalia. At the end of 2008, the group had captured Baidoa but not Mogadishu. By January 2009, Al-Shabaab and other militias had managed to force the Ethiopian troops to withdraw from the country, leaving behind an under-equipped African Union peacekeeping force to assist the Transitional Federal Government's troops.

=== Assassination attempt ===
On 17 September 2006, a suicide car bomber smashed his vehicle into Ahmed's convoy outside the National Parliament in Baidoa. The attack killed four of Ahmed's bodyguards as well as Ahmed's brother. Six attackers were also slain in the subsequent gun battle.

=== Health problems ===
Ahmed underwent a liver transplant in the 1990s. In early December 2007, he was admitted to a hospital in Nairobi for treatment of what his spokesman described as bronchitis, and on 4 January 2008, he collapsed in Baidoa and was taken to Ethiopia for treatment. Two days later, Ahmed was rushed to London for tests. He returned to Mogadishu on 16 February 2008; rebels promptly fired mortars at the presidential compound, reportedly wounding at least five people.

=== Dismissal of government ===
During June 2008, a faction of the Alliance for the Re-liberation of Somalia and the TFG signed a ceasefire agreement after months of talks in Djibouti. The agreement was met with resistance from elements within the TFG, chiefly President Yusuf. In the second half of 2008, Ahmed had been at loggerheads with then Prime Minister Nur Hassan Hussein over a proposed new cabinet, the latter of which Ahmed characterized as nothing more than a "clan deal". By mid-2008, President Yusuf had lost all the support he had accumulated in the international community. His primary backer, Ethiopia, had also become tired of the TFG president only offering military answers to serious political issues.

On 14 December 2008, Ahmed announced that he had dismissed Hussein and his government, citing corruption, inefficiency, treason and failure to bring peace to the war-torn country as reasons for the dismissal. Earlier in the year, Hussein had survived a vote of no confidence after having been accused by some lawmakers of embezzling state funds. Yusuf was placed under sanctions by the Intergovernmental Authority on Development (IGAD) for illegally sacking the speaker of parliament.

Hussein said that Ahmed did not have the power to fire him without parliamentary approval, while Ahmed asserted that he believed Parliament would endorse the dismissal. Parliament supported Hussein in a vote on 15 December, but Ahmed nevertheless appointed Mohamoud Mohamed Guled as Prime Minister to replace Hussein on 16 December.

On 21 December, Radio Garowe reported that 80 members of parliament held a conference in Baidoa where they all agreed that the vote of confidence in support of Hussein's government never took place. Ismail Ali Nur, who spoke on behalf of the dissenting lawmakers, indicated that Somalia's constitution requires a parliament quorum of no less than 139 MPs present for votes, but that "only 95 MPs" showed up as opposed to the 143 members of parliament claimed by Speaker Adan "Madobe" Mohamed. Nur urged people to "watch video footage recorded from that session."

On 24 December, the newly appointed Prime Minister Guled announced his resignation, citing that he did not wish to be "seen as a stumbling block to the peace process which is going well now."

Following Guled's resignation, Abdirashid Sed, who was close to President Ahmed, said that Ahmed would announce his resignation and retirement from politics at a special session of Parliament on 29 December. According to Sed, Ahmed made this decision "because he does not want to be seen as an obstacle to peace in Somalia".

=== Impeachment attempt and resignation ===
In December 2008, the TFG parliament moved to impeach President Abdullahi Yusuf, accusing him of being a dictator and an obstacle to peace.

On 29 December 2008, Abdullahi Yusuf Ahmed announced before a united parliament in Baidoa his resignation as President of Somalia. In his speech, which was broadcast on national radio, Ahmed expressed regret at failing to end the country's 17-year conflict. Yusuf stated that he had lost control of the country to Islamist insurgents, and blamed the international community for its failure to support the government. He further announced said that the speaker of parliament, Aden "Madobe" Mohamed, would succeed him in office per the Transitional Federal Government's Charter.

While it was suggested that Ahmed's resignation added chaos to the country's political landscape as Ethiopia withdrew its troops, some diplomats opined that it might have improved the prospects of striking a deal with the more moderate Islamist insurgents.

== Post-retirement ==
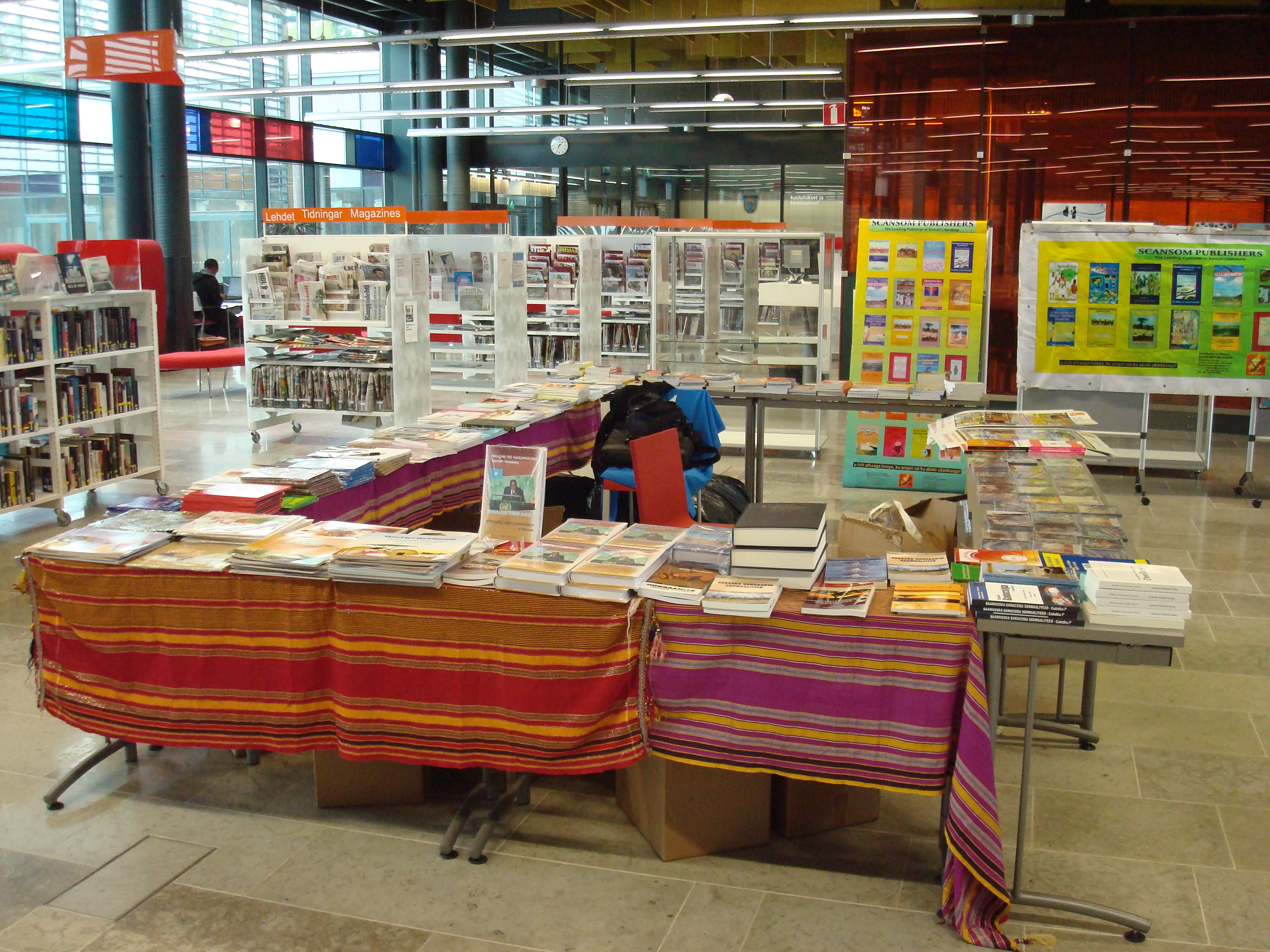
Copies of Ahmed's autobiography Halgan iyo Hagardaamo: Taariikh Nololeed ("Struggle and Conspiracy: A Memoir") and other books on display at the 2012 Somali Culture Fair in Helsinki.

After his exile from Somali politics, Ahmed was initially reported to have flown out of Baidoa back to his native Puntland in the northeast. He then arrived in Sana'a, the capital of Yemen, on 20 January 2009, along with his wife and 17 family members and guards. On 21 January, Al Arabiya reported that Ahmed was granted political asylum in Yemen, where he resided.

Yusuf spent the remainder of his life in the United Arab Emirates.

In 2011, Ahmed released his memoirs, titled Struggle and Conspiracy: A Memoir (Halgan iyo Hagardaamo: Taariikh Nololeed). He began a promotional European tour for the book late in the year and in early 2012.

== Death and funeral ==
On 23 March 2012, relatives and Radio Mogadishu announced that Abdullahi Yusuf Ahmed had died at age 77 from complications due to pneumonia. He had been receiving treatment for several weeks at the Zayed Military Hospital in Abu Dhabi, but had fallen into a coma over the previous few days.

Somalia's Transitional Federal Government, which Ahmed had co-founded, declared a three-day period of mourning for the late ruler and appointed a ministerial-level committee for the scheduled funeral proceedings. Somali citizens also offered their condolences and prayers, particularly in the northeastern Puntland region, where Ahmed is regarded as a founding father. Upon learning of Ahmed's death, Puntland Minister of State for Planning and International Cooperation, Abdulkadir Hashi, tweeted that "President Yusuf's death marks a huge loss for the Somali people and especially for Puntlanders. He was a great patriot & friend".

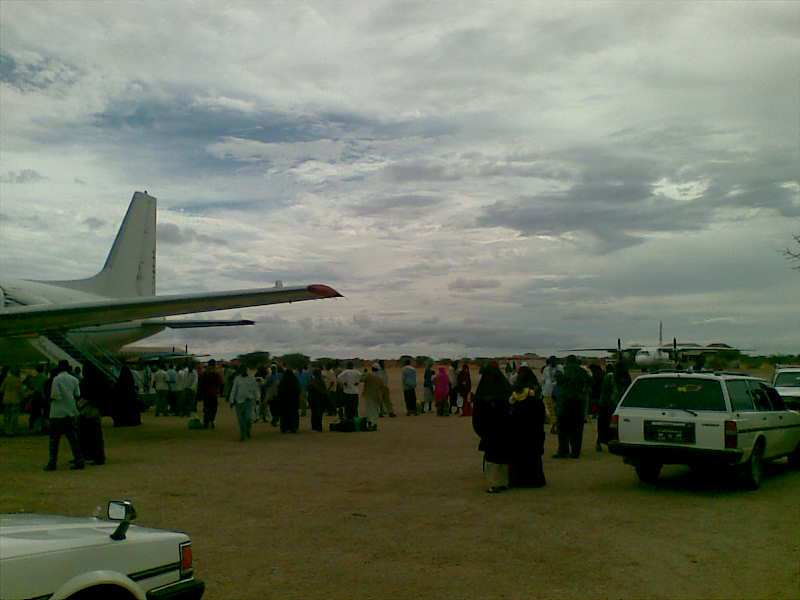
Galkayo Airport, renamed to Abdullahi Yusuf International Airport in honour of Abdullahi Yusuf Ahmed.

Ahmed was flown to the Aden Adde International Airport in Mogadishu, where the Bombay army band conducted a military funeral service in his honor and a Janaza prayer was dedicated to him. On 25 March 2012, the former president was then taken to his hometown of Galkacyo for a state burial. A 22-gun salute was fired upon his arrival, and the ensuing funeral ceremony was attended by over two thousand people. Numerous government officials and religious and clan leaders came to pay their last respects, including incumbent Puntland president Abdirahman Mohamud Farole, former Puntland president Mohamud Muse Hersi, TFG president Sharif Sheikh Ahmed, and Prime Minister of Somalia Abdiweli Mohamed Ali. International delegations from Djibouti, Ethiopia, Sudan and Yemen, among many others, also attended the interment. President Farole gave a brief speech noting that "Abdullahi was a patriotic man whose dedication and rigidness will inspire many to come."

In commemoration of the late leader, the Galkayo Airport was officially renamed as the Abdullahi Yusuf International Airport.

== See also ==
- Hussein Kulmiye Afrah
- Abdullah Mohamed Fadil
- Ismail Ali Abokor
- Abdirizak Mohamud Abubakar
- Ali Matan Hashi
- Abdullahi Ahmed Irro
- Muse Hassan Sheikh Sayid Abdulle
- Mohamed Osman Irro

== Notes ==
Political offices
New office	President of Puntland; 1998-2001	Succeeded by Yusuf Haji Nur; Acting
Preceded by Jama Ali Jama; Interim	President of Puntland; 2001–2004	Succeeded by Mohamed Abdi Hashi; Acting
Preceded by Abdiqasim Salad Hassan	President of Somalia; 2004–2008	Succeeded by Adan Mohamed Nuur Madobe; Acting
