= Dangorayo District =

Dangorayo
- District of Puntland
- Location in Puntland (Somalia).
- Coordinates: 8°43′40″N 49°20′30″E
- Federal State within Somalia: Puntland
- Region: Nugal
- Capital: Dangorayo
- Time zone: UTC+3 (EAT)

Dangorayo District (Somali: Degmada Dangorayo) is a district in the northeastern Nugal region of Puntland,

Its one of the four districts of Nugal regio.

Villages under Dangoroyo:
