= Kalabeyr, Nugal =

Kalabeyr Nugal Kalabeyr Nugaal
- Town
- Location in Somalia.
- Coordinates: 8°4′27″N 48°6′41″E
- Country: Somalia
- State: Puntland
- Region: Nugal
- Established: 1927

Government
  - Mayor: Abdirahman Dahir isse

Area
  - Total: 50 km^{2} (19 sq mi)
- Time zone: UTC+3 (EAT)

Gori Rit well-known Kalabeyr is a town in the northeastern Nugal region of Puntland, Somalia, under Garowe District.
