= Docol =

Town in Mudug, Somalia

Docol Do'ol دعل
- Town
- Location in Somalia.
- Coordinates: 6°25′56″N 47°29′21″E
- Country: Somalia: Galmudug
- Region: Mudug
- District: Galkayo
- Time zone: UTC+3 (EAT)

Docol (English: Do'ol, Arabic: دعل) is a town in the north-central Mudug region of Somalia. The town is located in the state of Galmudug, in the Galkayo District
