= Hamur, Somalia =

Hamur
- Town
- Location in Somalia.
- Coordinates: 8°43′10″N 48°44′59″E
- Country: Somalia: Puntland
- Region: Nugal
- Time zone: UTC+3 (EAT)

Hamur is a town in the northeastern Nugal region of Somalia.

== Notes ==
- Hamur, Somalia
