= Heded =

Heded Heded
- Village
- Location in Somalia
- Coordinates: 07°31′06″N 049°01′10″E
- Country: Somalia
- Region: Mudug
- District: Jariban
- Elevation: 332 m (1,089 ft)
- Time zone: UTC+3 (EAT)

Heded is a village in the Jariban District, Mudug region, Puntland, north-central Somalia.

The village lies in an arid landscape with sparse and scattered vegetation. There are no proper road connections, but vehicle tracks lead from the village in several directions.
