= Puntland crisis (2001–2003) =

Civil conflict in Puntland State of Somalia

Puntland Crisis (2001–2003)
- Part of Somali Civil War and Ethiopian–Somali conflict
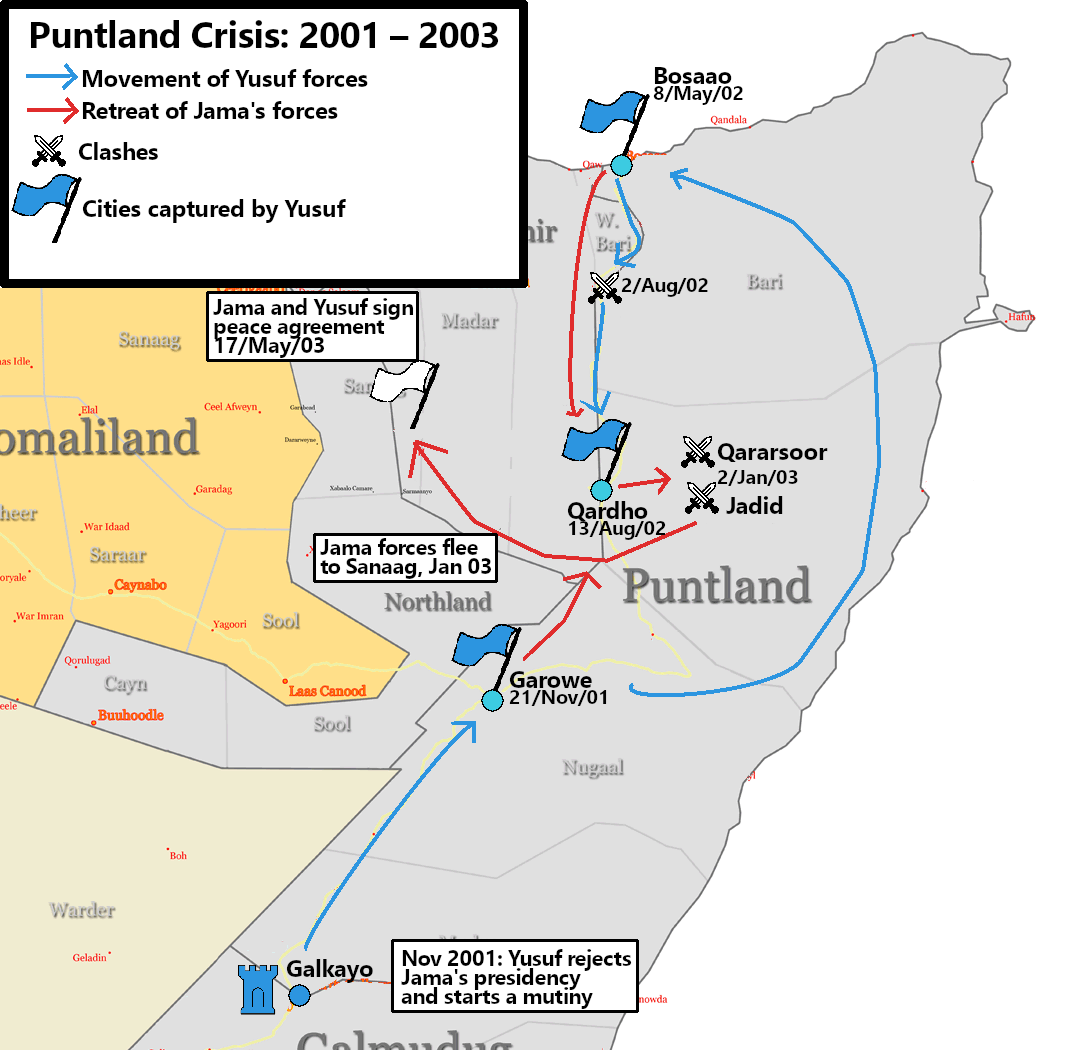
| Date | June 2001 – 17 May 2003 (1 year, 10 months, 3 weeks and 6 days) |
| Location | Puntland, Somalia |
| Result | Abdullahi Yusuf faction/Ethiopian victory |

Belligerents
| Puntland; Ethiopia | Puntland; Supported by: (Somalia) TNG |

Commanders and leaders
| Abdullahi Yusuf Ahmed; Ismail Warsame | Jama Ali Jama; Yusuf Haji Nur; Adde Muse |

Strength
| 1,000 strong 500 ethiopans | ~800 |

Casualties and losses
| ~300 | ~200 |
- Unknown

The Puntland Crisis (2001–2003) was an armed conflict that took place in the Puntland autonomous state of northeastern Somalia following a leadership dispute between Colonel Abdullahi Yusuf Ahmed and Colonel Jama Ali Jama after the latter had been elected as the region's new president.

After Puntland was established in 1998, Colonel Abdullahi Yusuf Ahmed was elected the regions first president, leading a regional transitional government set for two years. In 2000, the Transitional National Government (TNG) of Somalia was formed, which Yusuf's administration opposed out of concern that a new central state would favor the south. As Yusuf's term approached its end in 2001, his administration controversially moved to extend its rule, sparking a civil conflict within Puntland. Colonel Jama Ali Jama, a political rival to Yusuf who was supportive of the TNG initiative was elected in November 2001.

Rivalries intensified and tensions broke out in open violence after Yusuf rejected the election of Jama. At the invitation of Abdullahi Yusuf, the Ethiopian National Defence Force (ENDF) intervened in the conflict in support of him, based on the pretense that Jama was a supporter the Somali Islamist militant group Al-Itihaad Al-Islamiya. The Ethiopian government was opposed to the TNG, and by extension Jama Ali, due to his support of it.

Under the pretext of fighting 'terrorism' and with the backing of the Ethiopian army, Yusuf ultimately reasserted control in May 2002, solidifying his influence over Puntland.

== Background ==
In May 1998, the autonomous region of Puntland was formed in north eastern Somalia, with the city of Garowe declared its capital. Colonel Abdullahi Yusuf Ahmed, the former head of the Somali Salvation Democratic Front (SSDF), was elected to be the regions first president during July 1998 for a two-year transitionary period. A parliament and cabinet were established for the territory under Yusuf's tenure. During February 2000, the Puntland government prohibited all political activities until June 2001 – the scheduled end of the transition period. Yusuf's government claimed it had made the move to prevent unrest and civil war within the territory.

=== Transitional National Government and tensions with Ethiopia ===
In 2000, the first attempt at reforming the central Somali state came with the formation of the Transitional National Government (TNG) led by President Abdiqasam Salad Hassan. The emergence of the TNG alarmed Puntland's ruling government, who saw feared that a reunified Somalia would be oriented to the south. In January 2001, Abdullahi Yusuf requested the United Nations 'review its decision' to recognize the TNG and protested to the Arab League about support being given to the government.

Since the mid-90s, Ethiopia has been supplying allied militia in Somalia. After the TNG was formed Ethiopia supported groups in Somalia that resisted it and actively sponsored the formation of opposition alliances to preserve its strategic interests. In the period before the conflict in Puntland, Ethiopian National Defence Force (ENDF) troops had been making frequent incursions across to support militias fighting against the TNG. Ethiopia backed a coalition of warlords in order to undermine the TNG, which Abdullahi Yusuf was a member of. After the 9/11 attacks, the Ethiopian government also labelled TNG leaders as Islamic extremists who were pro-Bin Laden.

== Civil conflict ==
Abdullahi Yusuf's term as president of Puntland was set to expire in late June 2001. Just before the deadline came, the Puntland House of Representatives controversially approved a three-year extension of Yusuf's administration. The move was rejected by the High Court of Puntland which unsuccessfully attempted to overturn the extension by declaring all government institutions under its control. Some Puntland authorities announced the Abdullahi Yusuf had been sworn in for a second term. This move was rejected by the chief justice of Puntland, Yusuf Haji Nur who subsequently proclaimed himself acting president. On 6 August 2001 Yusuf's forces attacked the strategic port city of Bosaso, where Haji Nur was based. The attack failed and Yusuf's forces were routed.

In late August 2001 a general conference, attended by representatives of all major clans in Puntland, was opened in Garowe in order to elect a new president and vice-president of Puntland along with a new assembly. Senior clan elders confirmed Haji Nur's role as 'acting president' on 31 August 2001. Abdullahi Yusuf rejected the decision and heavy fighting ensued between Puntland forces loyal to Yusuf and Nur. After several months of deliberations, Colonel Jama Ali Jama was elected President of Puntland and Ahmed Mohamoud Gunle as his vice-president in mid-November 2001.

=== Yusuf – Jama War ===
Abdullahi Yusuf rejected the election of the new president, and fighting between Jama and Yusuf's forces broke out several days later in Garowe. Ali Jama was linked to the Transitional National Government, which alarmed the government of Ethiopia - as it was determined to remove the TNG. Yusuf had used the "war on terror" to justify the operation and claimed Jama supported the Islamist militant group Al-Itihaad Al-Islamiya. In an interview with the BBC, Jama accused Yusuf of using excessive force.

In November 2001, Abdullahi Yusuf attacked Garowe backed by 1,000 Ethiopian troops. The Ethiopians withdrew the day following the incident. Jama withdrew to the port of Bosaso, where he began reorganizing to retake the regions capital. Ethiopian troops finally ousted Jama and install Yusuf six months later in May 2002. Yusuf claimed his political rivals were backed by Al-Ittihad. As fighting between Jama and Yusuf was ongoing during December 2001, Ethiopian National Defence Force (ENDF) troops again intervened on behalf of Yusuf. By the end of the year, Puntland was effectively divided into two regions controlled by Yusuf and Jama.

During January 2002, Ethiopia deployed forces to Puntland, accusing Jama of harboring members of Al-Itihaad—a claim Jama denied. That month there were reportedly 300 Ethiopian troops in Puntland. The TNG called on Ethiopia to withdraw its troops from Puntland, but the Ethiopian government denied having any forces there, despite their presence being observed by United Nations staff in the region. Yusuf declared a state of emergency and suspended the Puntland constitution, claiming that the move was necessary to resolve "confusions" caused by the TNG and its supporters. During May 2002, Yusuf launched a three-day campaign with Ethiopian military support to capture the port city of Bosaso, defeated Jama and reasserted his control over much of Puntland.

In early August 2002 fierce skirmishes broke out between the two factions outside of Bosaso. On 17 August, Sultan Hurre of the Omar Mohamoud sub-clan was assassinated by Abdullahi Yusuf's security forces. Hurre had been a prominent opponent of Yusuf during the conflict. Yusuf's faction banned two BBC reporters that same month for allegedly being sympathetic to Jama. The Somali Broadcasting Corporation had been shut down on the same grounds several months earlier.

In early January 2003, fighting broke out between Jama and Yusuf. On 17 May 2003 both sides signed a peace agreement.
