= Gawaan =

Populated place in Mudug, Somalia

- Populated place
- Location in Somalia.
- Coordinates: 5°18′48″N 48°17′41″E
- Country: Somalia
- State: Galmudug
- Region: Mudug
- Time zone: UTC+3 (EAT)

Gawaan (Somali: Gawaan Dheere) is a populated place in the north-central Mudug region of Somalia.

== Overview ==
The town is built upon high ground. From this elevation, it is possible to see the city of Hobyo and the Somali Sea, which lies a further 30 km to the east.

Wisil is located to the west on the road to Galkacyo.

== Demographics ==
Gawaan's population mostly belongs to the Somali ethnic group, with the Sacad sub-clan of the Habar Gidir Hawiye especially well represented.
