= Xerojaale =

Town in Mudug, Somalia

Xerojaale (also referred to as "Xero-jale" or "Xero-Jaale") is a small town located the Western Mudug region of Somalia, between Galkayo and Galdogob District.
