= Hawa Abdi Samatar =

Somali political figure

Hawa Abdi Samatar حواء عبدي ساماتار
- Born: Galkacyo, Somalia
- Died: 10 May 2022; Abu Dhabi, United Arab Emirates
- Occupation: First Lady
- Title: Marwada Qaranka
- Spouse: Abdullahi Yusuf Ahmed before (2012)
- Children: 4

Hawa Abdi Samatar (Somali: Xaawo Cabdi Samatar, Arabic: حواء عبدي ساماتار) was a Somali political figure. She was the former First Lady of Somalia, and the wife of erstwhile President of Somalia and Puntland, the late Colonel Abdullahi Yusuf Ahmed. The couple had two sons and two daughters in addition to six grandchildren.

== Death ==
She died in United Arab Emirates in 2022.

== See also ==
- Abdullahi Yusuf Ahmed
