= Godobjiran =

District in Nugal, Somalia

- Town
- Location in Somalia
- Coordinates: 7°30′43″N 49°24′45″E
- Country: Somalia
- Region: Nugal: Puntland
- District: Godobjiran
- Time zone: UTC+3 (EAT)

Godobjiran is a city in the northeastern Nugal province of Somalia. It serves as the center of the Godobjiran District in the autonomous Puntland state.

== Education ==
Godobjiran has a number of academic institutions. According to the Puntland Ministry of Education, there are 7 primary schools in the Godobjiran District. Among these are Wargudud, Jiifle, Dhinowda and Godobjiran Primary.

== Economy ==
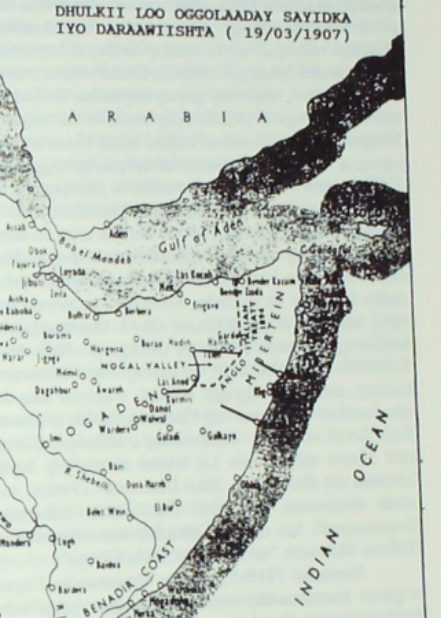
Territory of Darawiish sultan Diiriye Guure in 1907 (marked out in black ink delineation), according to Somali historian Muxamed Ibraahim Muxamed, consisted of the Ciid-Nugaal regions of Nugaal province, Las Anod District, Xudun District, Taleh District, Boocame District and Bookh District, including Godobjiran

In March 2015, the Ministry of Labour, Youth and Sports in conjunction with the European Union and World Vision launched the Nugal Empowerment for Better Livelihood Project in the Godobjiran, Garowe, Dangorayo, Eyl and Burtinle districts of Puntland. The three-year initiative is valued at $3 million EUR, and is part of the New Deal Compact for Somalia. It aims buttress the regional economic sector through business support, training and non-formal education programs, community awareness workshops, and mentoring and networking drives.

== Somali Civil War ==
In March 2015, it was taken over by Al-Shabaab. However this did not last long, as the territory was taken over by Puntland security forces.
