= Qaan Dhoole =

- Town
- Location in Somalia.
- Coordinates: 2°41′36″N 44°53′44″E
- Country: Somalia
- Region: Lower Shabelle
- Time zone: UTC+3 (EAT)

Qaan Dhoole is a town in the southeastern Lower Shabelle (Shabeellaha Hoose) region of Somalia.
