= Puntland Highway Authority =

State-run social welfare

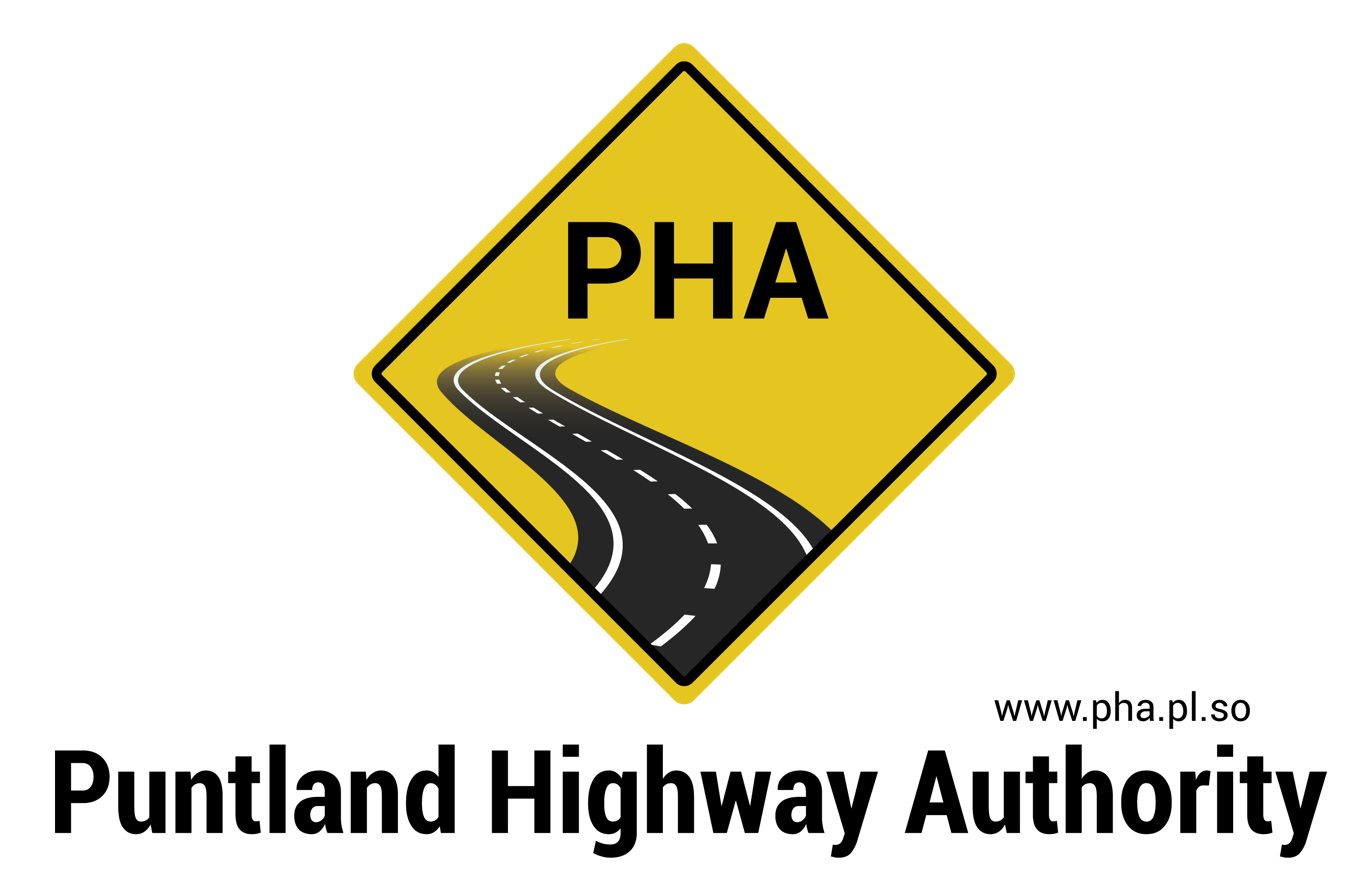

Agency overview
- Formed: 1996
- Type: Transportation authority
- Jurisdiction: Government of Puntland
- Headquarters: Garowe, Puntland, Somalia; 8°24′N 48°29′E
- Motto: Better roads save lives
- Employees: 71
- Annual budget: $9 m U S dollar ( 2022)
- Agency executive: Abdifitah Mohamed Sugule, Chairman of the Puntland Highway Authority
- Website: https://www.pha.pl.so/

Puntland Highway Authority (PHA) is a highway authority government body, established by law no. 18, in the year 2000, in charge of road transportation and infrastructure and responsible for maintaining and developing the road network throughout in the autonomous state of Puntland, Somalia. It is thus of utmost necessity for Puntland Highway Authority to adhere to standard engineering procedures and principles. The community leaders inspired Puntland Highway Authority in Puntland in 1996. It had been operating two years before forming the Regional Autonomy of Puntland in 1998.

== Overview ==
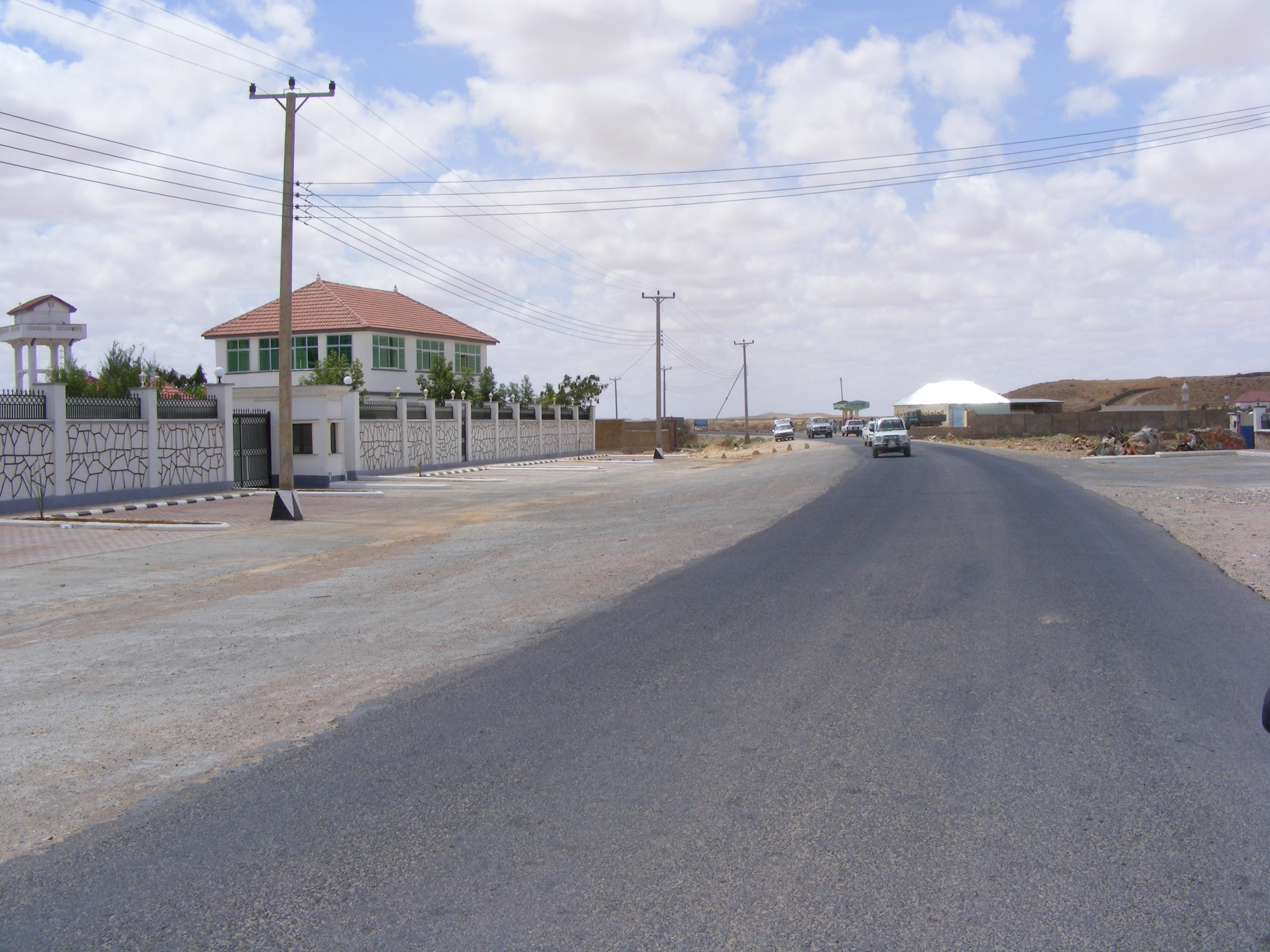
Roadside view of a neighborhood in Garowe.

In 2012, the Puntland Highway Authority completed rehabilitation work on the central artery linking Puntland's administrative capital Garowe with Galkayo, another major city in the region. The transportation body also began an upgrade and repair project in June 2012 on the large thoroughfare between the commercial hub of Bosaso and Garowe.

Additionally, renovations were initiated in October 2012 on the central artery linking Bosaso with Qardho. The PHA also plans to construct new roads connecting littoral towns in the region to the main highway, including Bargaal, Eyl, Hafun and Jariban.

In October 2014, the Puntland Highway Authority began construction on a new highway connecting the presidential palace in Garowe with various other parts of the administrative capital. Financing for the project was provided by the Puntland government. According to the Head of the PHA Mohamud Abdinur Adan, the new thoroughfare aims to facilitate local transportation and movement. Puntland Minister of Public Works Mohamed Hersi also indicated that the Puntland authorities plan to build and repair other roads linking to the regional urban centers.
