= Adaleafuen =

- Town
- Location in Somalia.
- Coordinates: 3°13′14″N 45°25′28″E
- Country: Somalia
- Region: Hiran
- Time zone: UTC+3 (EAT)

Adale Afwayno is a town in the central Hiran region of Somalia.
