= Burane =

Town in middle Shabelle, Hirshabelle, Somalia

- Town
- Location in Somalia
- Coordinates: 02°57′38″N 45°30′51″E
- Country: Somalia
- Region: Shabeellaha Dhexe
- District: Jowhar
- Time zone: UTC+3 (EAT)

Burane is a district in the northwestern Shabeellaha Dhexe province of Somalia.

Buurane is situated nearby to the village Ceynte and the locality Xudur-Ciise that come under Buurane District.

== Demographic ==
The broader Burane town has a total population of 18,938 residents. The town is primarily inhabited by the Hawaadle clan.

== Places near Buurane ==
Ceynte - Cali Deer - Axmed cigoow - Bannaan - Barre cali xasan - Barrey - Beerta siyago - Buulo madina - Buurfuule - Cabbaas - Cabdulle xabad - Dabeylley - Garsaalley - Gumar gaalo - Gumarrey -
