= Maxamedbuurfuule =

- Town
- Location in Somalia.
- Coordinates: 2°55′N 45°29′E
- Country: Somalia
- Region: Hiran
- Time zone: UTC+3 (EAT)

Maxamedbuurfuule is a town located in the central Hiran region of Somalia.
