= Galaangale =

- Town
- Location in Somalia.
- Coordinates: 2°27′0″N 45°4′0″E
- Country: Somalia
- Region: Lower Shebelle
- Time zone: UTC+3 (EAT)

Galaangale is a town in the southeastern Lower Shebelle (Shabeellaha Hoose) region of Somalia.
