= Cabdullekudaad =

Cabdulle Kudaad
- Town
- Location in Somalia.
- Coordinates: 2°57′N 45°43′E
- Country: Somalia
- Region: Hiran
- Time zone: UTC+3 (EAT)

Cabdulle Kudaad is a town located in the central Hiran region of Somalia.
