= Jidlabe =

Town in Mudug, Somalia

- Town
- Location in Somalia.
- Coordinates: 7°14′N 48°44′E
- Country: Somalia
- State: Puntland
- Region: Mudug
- Time zone: UTC+3 (EAT)

Jidlabe is a town in the north-central Mudug region of Somalia.
