= Tile, Somalia =

- Location in Somalia
- Coordinates: 03°06′00″N 45°52′00″E
- Country: Somalia
- Region: Shabeellaha Dhexe
- Time zone: UTC+3 (EAT)

Tile is a village located in the Jowhar District of the Shabeellaha Dhexe region of Somalia. It's mostly inhabited by the Xawaadle subclan of Hawiye
