= Berhani =

Berhani (Somali: Beer Xaani or Beerxaani; also spelled Berhaani, Beerhani and Berhane) a locality in Lower Juba, Somalia located approximately 0.22014°S 42.19594°E, northwest of Kismayo. Geographic names data supplied by the National Geospatial-Intelligence Agency records Beer Xaani as a locality in Lower Juba at approximately 0.21763°S 42.19831°E. GeoNames likewise lists Beer Xaani as a locality in Lower Juba, giving coordinates of approximately 0.22014°S 42.19594°E.

The locality is also known by names Berxaani, Berhaani, Beer-hani and Berhane. A 2023 decision by the Icelandic Immigration and Appeals Board they identified Berxaani as another name for Berhani and placed the settlement in Lower Juba near Kismayo. A 2014 decision of the Belgian Council for Alien Law Litigation likewise identified Berhani as Beer Xaani.

== See also ==
- Lower Juba
- Kismayo
- Jubaland
