= Turdho =

- Town
- Location in Somalia
- Coordinates: 0°4′43″S 42°43′48″E
- Country: Somalia
- Region: Lower Juba
- Time zone: UTC+3 (EAT)

Turdho is a town in the southwestern Lower Juba (Jubbada Hoose) region of Somalia.
