= Jariban =

Jariiban Jarriiban جريبن
- Town
- Location in Somalia.
- Coordinates: 7°13′N 48°51′E
- State: Puntland
- Region: Mudug
- District: Jariban
- Time zone: UTC+3 (EAT)
- Climate: BWh

Jariban (Somali: Jarriiban, Arabic: جريبن, Italian: Geriban) Somali pronunciation: [(d)ʒa.r'iːbãn] is a town in the north-central Mudug region of Somalia. It is the center of the Jariban District. It is administered by Puntland.

== Demographics ==
Jariban has a population of approximately 20,000 inhabitants. The Jariban District has a total population of 39,207 residents. CABDI CIISE Clan and shikhaal looboge is dominant inhabitants of Jariiban District while other Omar Mohamud branches like Reer Mahad, Mohamed Omar inhibit.

== Services ==
In October 2014, the Puntland government in conjunction with the local Kaalo NGO and UN-HABITAT launched a new regional census to gather basic information in order to facilitate social service planning and development, as well as tax collection in remote areas. According to senior Puntland officials, a similar survey was already carried out in towns near the principal Garowe–Bosaso Highway. The new census initiative is slated to begin in the Jariban District, Bayla District and Eyl Districts.

== Education ==
Jariban has a number of academic institutions. According to the Puntland Ministry of Education, there are above 20 primary schools in the Jariban District. Among these are Balibusle, Malaasle, Mareer, Garcad, Dhinowda, Ceelxagar, Sallax, Labilamane, Kulub, Malye, Raydable, Islaan Cabdulaahi, Jariban, Ceel-Gaws Primary School and others. Secondary schools in the area include Ceel-Gaws Secondary, Balibusle Secondary, Sallax Garacad Secondary, Labilamane Secondary and Jariban Secondary.

== Transportation ==
In 2012, the Puntland Highway Authority (PHA) announced a project to connect Jariban and other littoral towns in Puntland to the main regional highway. The 750 km thoroughfare links major cities in the northern part of Somalia, such as Bosaso, Galkayo and Garowe, with towns in the south.
