= Eyl =

Eyl Eil
- Town
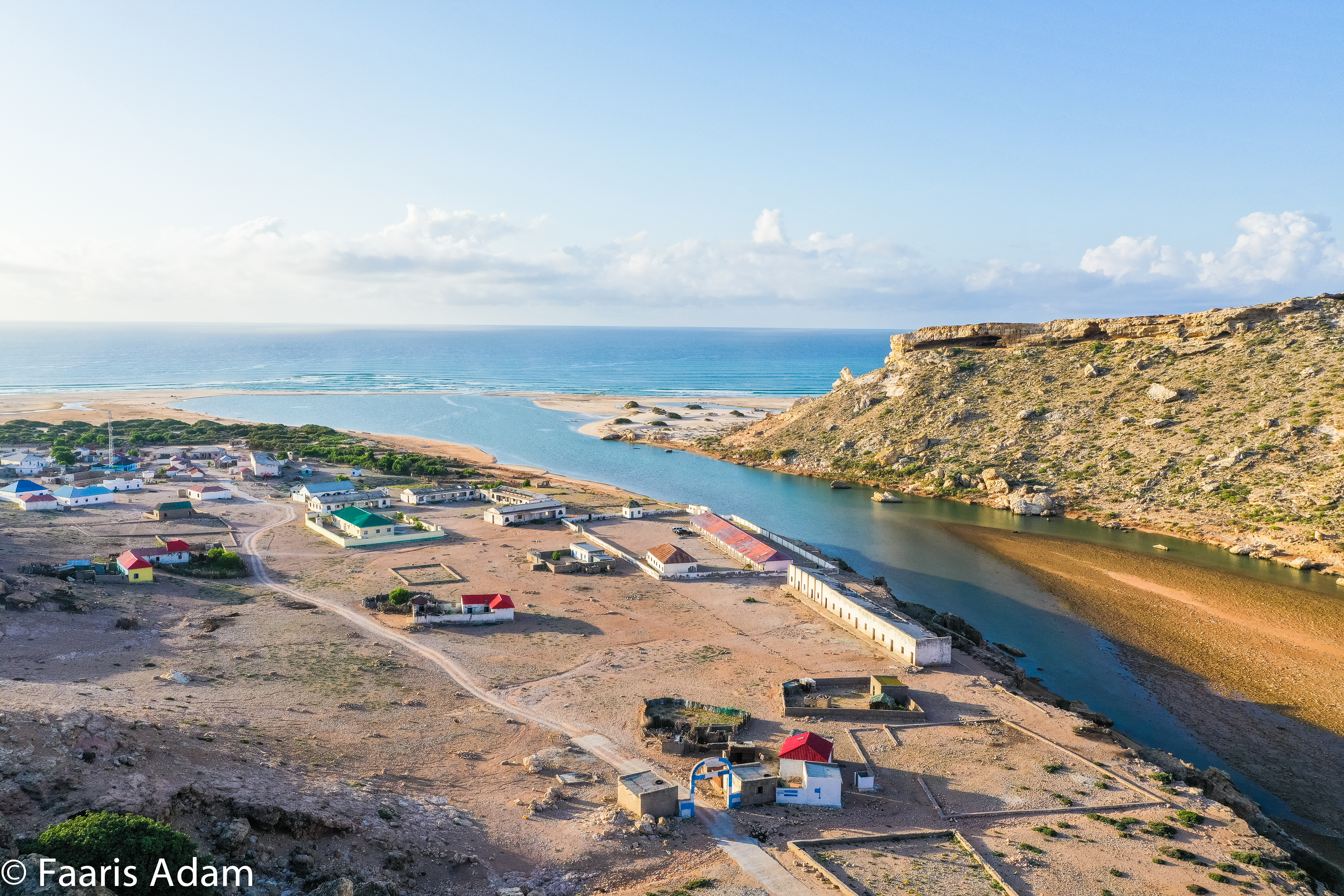
- Aerial view of Eyl town

- Location in Somalia.
- Coordinates: 7°58′00″N 49°51′00″E
- Country: Somalia
- State: Puntland
- Region: Nugal
- District: Eyl

Government
  - Mayor: Faysal Khaliif Wacays

Population
  - Total: 21,700
- Time zone: UTC+3 (EAT)

Eyl is an ancient port town in the northeastern Nugal region of Puntland, Somalia. It is one of the four districts of the Nugal region. When the Dervish state temporarily occupied the Nugal valley as an Italian protectorate between 1905 and 1908, Eyl served as the main fortified settlement in the region together with Illig, the de facto capital located to the south of the river. Eyl is best known as the terminus and mouth of the seasonal and intermittent Nugal river.

== History ==
=== Medieval ===
Eyl is the site of many historical artifacts and structures. Along with a rock shelter near the southern town of Buur Heybe, it is the seat of the first professional archaeological excavation in the country.

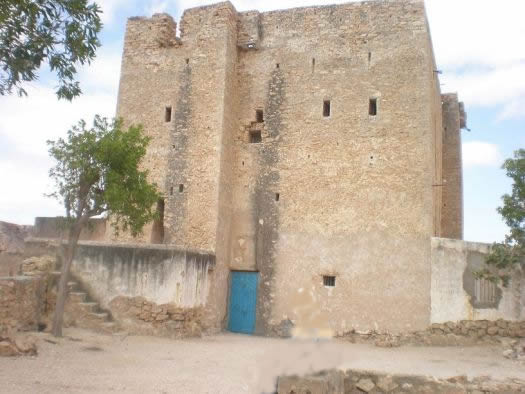
The Dervish state's historic government-in-exile fortress Daarta Dhowre Sheneeleh

=== Dervish government-in-exile ===
At the conclusion of the fourth expedition against the Dervish state, the city served as a refuge for the Dervish state's forces and its "Haroun" (Dervish state's administration). Several forts remain from this period, in addition to colonial edifices built by the Italians. Daarta Dhowre Sheneeleh, a prominent fort from the Darawiish era, is located in the city.

The notion of the building of fortresses for Dervish inhabitation was conceived in prior to Dervish-colonial hostilities when the Dervish State which in the late 1890s had relations of relative tranquility with local and colonial neighbours, built its first fort at Halin, a town adjacent to Taleh, the historic capital of the Dervish State. According to the British War Office, the condition of the Dervish State at Eyl and Illig was one of them seeking sanctuary as refugees, viewing Italian protectorate territory as a "safe line of retreat" and as a place of "refuge in their midst":

The Mullah, with practically only his Ali Gheri following, is a discredited refugee in the Mijjarten territory, at the mercy of Osman Mahmud. His actual capture by the field force is, under present conditions, in my opinion impracticable ... the operations already ordered for the capture of Illig and dealing a last blow at the Mullah are to be carried out

After 1908, the Dervish Haroun was moved back from the mouth of the Nogal to their former capital at Taleh, bringing the period of truce between the Dervish state and surrounding colonial powers to an end. In January 1920, at the start of the final British expedition against the Mullah, the Nugal valley became a contested military objective for the surrounding sultanates. Majeerteen forces under the command of Hersi Boqor, son of the Sultan, captured the forts at Gabah and Eyl after a seven-day siege, taking 319 prisoners and approximately 500 rifles. Meanwhile, Ali Yusuf's forces departed from Hobyo and occupied Illig, effectively establishing the Nugal river as the border between the two sultanates.

Eyl was later directly occupied by Italian troops after a brief engagement on 19 April 1926, during the Campaign of the Sultanates. In May, Hersi Boqor attempted to recapture the town, but his forces were counterattacked and dispersed.

=== Contemporary ===
Following the outbreak of the civil war in the early 1990s, foreign boats began to illegally fish in the unpatrolled waters off Eyl's coastline. Piracy subsequently emerged as fishermen banded together to protect their livelihood. However, by 2010, intensive security operations by Puntland's military forces coupled with community-led initiatives managed to force out the pirates from their operating centers in the area as well as adjacent settlements.

In March 2012, the Puntland Maritime Police Force (PMPF) dispatched a unit of officers and support elements to Eyl at the request of the municipal authorities. The move was intended to ensure permanent security in the area and to support the local administration. To this end, PMPF soldiers were slated to establish a Forward Operating Base (FOB) in the town earmarked for counter-piracy activities and to begin construction of a logistics airstrip, and to engage in water-drilling. In December 2014, Puntland President Abdiweli Mohamed Ali laid the foundation stone for a new PMPF base in Eyl, which occupies an area of 300 square meters on land donated by the municipality.

== Municipality ==
Town affairs are managed by the Eyl Municipality. As of March 2022, the city authority was led by Mayor Faysal Khaliif Wacays.

== Demographics ==
Eyl has a population of around 21,700 inhabitants. The broader Eyl District has a total population of around 32,345 residents. Leelkase and Majeerteen are mainly the dominant clans and make up the majority of the population.

== Services ==
As of 2012, the town has one general hospital serving residents. Plans are underway to expand delivery. In April 2012, community leaders and civil society representatives met with the Italian Ambassador to Somalia, Andrea Mazzella, to discuss strategies for ameliorating local health and education services.

In October 2014, the Puntland government in conjunction with the local Kaalo NGO and UN-HABITAT launched a new regional census to gather basic information in order to facilitate social service planning and development, as well as tax collection in remote areas. According to senior Puntland officials, a similar survey was already carried out in towns near the principal Garowe–Bosaso Highway. The new census initiative is slated to begin in the Eyl District, in addition to the Bayla District and Jariban Districts.

== Education ==
Eyl has a number of academic institutions. According to the Puntland Ministry of Education, there are currently 13 primary schools in the Eyl District. Among these are Qarxis Primary, Horsed, Kabal and Xasbahal. Secondary schools in the area include Eyl Secondary.

== Economy ==
Prior to the start of the civil war, Eyl was one of the chief fishing hubs in Somalia. Tuna, lobster, and other high value marine stock were harvested locally for domestic and international seafood markets. The Puntland authorities have since endeavoured to work with the townspeople to rebuild the industry and normalize trade.

As of 2012, several new development projects are slated to be carried out in the town, with the Italian government pledging support.

In September 2013, Puntland Minister of Fisheries, Mohamed Farah Adan, announced that the Puntland government plans to open two new marine training schools in Eyl and Bandar Siyada (Qaw), another northeastern coastal town. The institutes are intended to buttress the regional fisheries industry and enhance the skill set of the Ministry's personnel and local fishermen.

In March 2015, the Ministry of Labour, Youth and Sports in conjunction with the European Union and World Vision launched the Nugal Empowerment for Better Livelihood Project in the Eyl, Garowe, Dangorayo, Godobjiran and Burtinle districts of Puntland. The three-year initiative is valued at $3 million EUR, and is part of the New Deal Compact for Somalia. It aims to buttress the regional economic sector through business support, training and non-formal education programs, community awareness workshops, and mentoring and networking drives.

Somalia’s crucial yellowfin tuna stock is highly threatened by illegal coastal fishing, costing the country $300 million annually, according to Dave Harvilicz, Assistant Secretary for Cyber, Infrastructure, Risk & Resilience Policy, and Plans at the U.S. Department of Homeland Security. In November 2024, in protest of foreign boats fishing nearby waters, a group of "angry young local men in coastal communities" hijacked the Liao Dong Yu 578, a vessel known for illegal fishing off the coast. The vessel and crew were released in January 2025, after Chinese Ambassador Wang Yu delivered a $2 million ransom. The hijackers stated that "We are not pirates. We are a community under siege." On January 1, 2026, the same vessel was again reported hijacked while fishing the same waters.

== Media ==
Media outlets serving Eyl include the Garowe-based Radio Garowe, the sister outlet to Garowe Online. The broadcaster launched a new local FM station in March, 2012.

== Transportation ==
In 2012, the Puntland Highway Authority (PHA) announced a project to connect Eyl and other littoral towns in Puntland to the main regional highway. The 750 km thoroughfare links major cities in the northern part of Somalia, such as Bosaso, Galkayo and Garowe, with other towns in the south. In May 2014, Puntland Vice President Abdihakim Abdullahi Haji Omar arrived in Eyl to inaugurate a newly completed 27 kilometer paved road between the town and adjacent hamlets.

For air transportation, Eyl is served by the Eyl Airport.

== Notable residents ==
- Abdulkadir Nur Farah — Somali Cleric was assassinated by Al-Shabab 2013.
- Hirsi Bulhan Farah – Former Minister in the civilian government of the 1960s, a political prisoner. Former interim chairman of the Somali parliament and entrepreneur.
- Abdirahman Mohamud Farole – former President of Puntland.
- Abdulqawi Yusuf – international lawyer and President of the International Court of Justice
- Abshir Boyah Pirate leader during Piracy off the coast of Somalia
