= Arar Lugole =

- Town
- Location in Somalia.
- Coordinates: 3°16′N 45°28′E
- Country: Somalia
- Region: Hiran
- Time zone: UTC+3 (EAT)

Arar Lugole is a town in the southern Hiran region of Somalia.
