= Garowe District =

Garowe
- District of Puntland
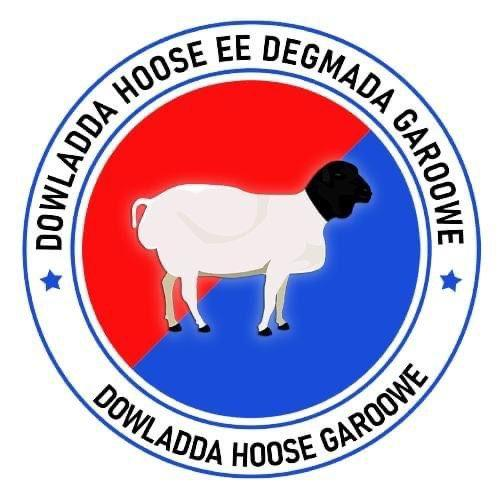
- Coat of arms

- Location in Puntland (Somalia).
- Coordinates: 8°24′6.41″N 48°29′3.32″E
- Federal State within Somalia: Puntland
- Region: Nugal
- Capital: Garowe

Population (2011)
  - District of Puntland: 380,000
  - Urban: 120,000
  - Rural: 260,000
- Time zone: UTC+3 (EAT)

Garowe District (Somali: Degmada Garowe) is a district in the northeastern Nugal region of Puntland, a state with a high degree of autonomy within the Federal Republic of Somalia. The district capital is Garowe. Garowe's district status is two-pronged: Garowe is both a district in Somalia's federal administrative system, and a district in Puntland's own -overlapping- system of administrative subdivisions. In both systems Garowe is also the capital of the entire Nugal Region. But the borders of Nugal and the districts within that region are different in both systems. In the federal system the Garowe District is one of Nugal's 3 districts; in Puntland's system it is one of Nugal's 5 districts.

Within the Puntland administration, Garowe District's status was confirmed in Article 2 of "Law Nr. 04 of 15 August 2023 concerning the amendment of the Law on the Election of Local Councils of the Government of Puntland" (Sharci Lr. 03 ee 15^{-ka} Agoosto 2023, kuna saabsan wax-ka-bedelka Sharciga Doorashooyinka Goleyaasha Deegaanka Dowladda Puntland).
Garowe is a status "A" district, which means its Council has 33 members.

The Garowe District in the Somali federal administration is clearly demarcated and maps of the district are widely available (see External Links). In the districts created by Puntland the situation is different. Article 120(3) of the Puntland Constitution confers upon the government the responsibility to demarcate the boundaries of the 9 regions and 48 districts of Puntland. An attempt at demarcation was made in 2022 but contained many errors and the demarcation method chosen made it impossible to convert the data into maps. As a result, there are almost no authoritative maps of the Puntland districts, and apart from the district capitals it often remains unclear in which district a certain village lies or which districts share borders. As the districts also function as electoral districts, this provides a measure of flexibility. But the lack of clarity make Puntlands administrative divisions an unusable tool for the national Somali government or for outside entities. The UN, for instance, still use the old/formal administrative divisions of Somalia. So do Wikipedia, Google Maps and many others.

The Garowe District is an exception to this situation, as in its Garowe District Development Framework (DDF) of September 2011 the Puntland government did provide a map of the Garowe District. In this map, Puntland's Garowe District is somewhat larger than the federal version as its southern border extends further south, swallowing a strip of the Burtinle District. Puntland's Garowe District includes the following villages: Wadajir, Waberi, Hantiwadag, Hodan, Horseed, 1st August, Israac (Bilan & Barwaqo), Uun, Sinujiif, Kalabayr, Awr-ulus, Reebanti, Yoonbays, Xamxamaa, Balley, Cel-wacayseed, Rabable, Ilma-ader, Tuulo-Oman, Abarey, Birta-dher, Hayanle, Timirka, Ayna-iskax, Siiga-dher, Mayle, Laqlaajis, Qalanqal, Xamur, Salaxley and "22aad".
