= Mareergur =

Mareergur Mareer gur
- Town

- Location in Somalia
- Coordinates: 5°45′0″N 46°31′0″E
- Country: Somalia
- State: Galmudug
- Region: Galguduud
- District: Dusmareb

Population
  - Total: 50,000

Mareergur (Somali: Mareer Gur, also known as Merergur) is a town located in the Galguduud region of Galmudug state of Somalia.

== Geography ==
Mareergur is 30 km from Dhusamareb the capital city of Galmudug state of Somalia and the administrative capital of the Galguduud region.

== Demographics ==
Mareergur has a population of around 50,000, inhabitants. It is primarily inhabited by people from the Somali ethnic group, with the Ayr sub-clan of Habar Gidir well-represented.

== Climate ==
Mareergur has a hot arid climate. The weather is generally hot, sunny and dry during the dry seasons but during the rainy seasons the town is green and cold. As other Somali regions, it has two rainy seasons and two dry seasons, each of three months.

== Economy ==
Mareergur's economy depends mostly on livestock. There are a few livestock markets in the town where people sell and buy livestock from each other. Mareergur's economy also depends on exports of livestock.
