= Jiifyarey =

- Town
- Location in Somalia.
- Coordinates: 3°5′N 45°44′E
- Country: Somalia
- Region: Hiran
- Time zone: UTC+3 (EAT)

Jiifyarey (Jiif Yarey) is a town in the central Hiran region of Somalia. It's mostly inhabited by the Xawaadle subclan of the larger Hawiye Somali clan
