= Ceelgula =

Ceelgua southern Mudug El Gula عيل جول
- District
- Ceelguula

- Location in Somalia
- Coordinates: 6°1′N 47°51′E
- Country: Somalia
- State: Galmudug
- Region: Mudug
- District: Ceelgula
- Time zone: UTC+3 (EAT)

Elgula (Somali: Ceelguula, Arabic: عيل جول) sometimes misspelled as (Colguula, Celgula) is a town in the South-central Mudug region of Somalia.It is located in Galmudug state and situated in Ceelgula District.

== Location ==
The town is 797 km away from Mogadishu, 119 km away from Gaalkacyo and 173 km away from Hobyo.

It is situated between the city of Gaalkacyo and the Ancient Port city of Hobyo.

== Education ==
The town has Ceelgula Primary School and Ceelgula Secondary School.

== Radio station ==
The town has a privately owned radio station outlet that airs 10 hours a day. The station focuses on local news as well as news on the regions controlled by Galmudug state, which includes daily news, sports, music, education, health and political interviews.

== Health facilities ==
There are 2 health clinics in the town as well as a hospital undergoing construction currently.
