= Kulan Xagay =

- Town
- Location in Somalia.
- Coordinates: 3°16′10″N 45°31′02″E
- Country: Somalia
- Region: Hiran
- Time zone: UTC+3 (EAT)

Kulan Xagay is a town in the central Hiran region of Somalia. It's mostly inhabited by the Xawaadle subclan of Hawiye
