= Burtinle District =

Distrit in Nugal region, Somalia

Burtinle
- District
- Location within Somalia
- Coordinates: 7.8°N 48.4°E
- Country: Somalia
- Region: Nugal
- Established: 19th century
- Time zone: UTC+3 (EAT)

Burtinle District (Somali: Degmada Burtinle) is a district in the northeastern Nugal region of Somalia. Its capital is Burtinle.
