= Quraciitallal =

- Town
- Location in Somalia.
- Coordinates: 3°30′36″N 45°36′46″E
- Country: Somalia
- Region: Hiran
- Time zone: UTC+3 (EAT)

Quraciitallal is a town in the central Hiran region of Somalia.
