= Gowlallo =

- Town
- Location in Somalia.
- Coordinates: 6°36′48″N 47°4′14″E
- Country: Somalia
- Region: Mudug
- Time zone: UTC+3 (EAT)

Gowlallo is a town in the north-central Mudug region of Somalia.
