= Daharro =

- Town
- Location in Somalia.
- Coordinates: 3°53′N 45°33′E
- Country: Somalia
- Region: Hiran
- Time zone: UTC+3 (EAT)

Daharro is a town in the central Hiran region of Somalia. It's mostly inhabited by the Xawaadle sub clan of the larger hawiye Somali clan.
