= Yusuf Haji Nur =

Acting president of Puntland (died 2019)

Yusuf Haji Nur يوسف حاجي نور
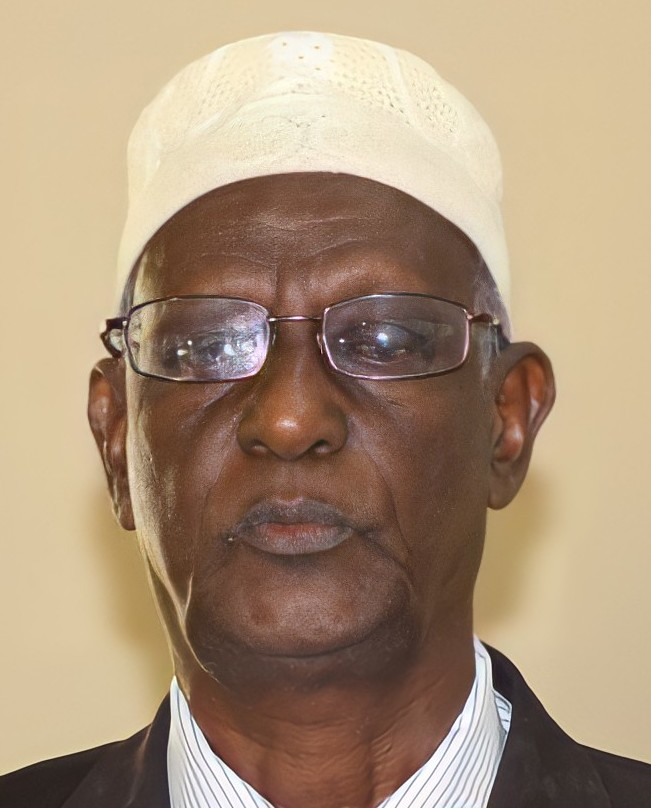

Acting President of Puntland
- In office 1 July 2001 – 14 November 2001
- Preceded by: Abdullahi Yusuf Ahmed
- Succeeded by: Jama Ali Jama

Chief Justice of Puntland
- In office 16 August 2016 – 23 June 2019
- In office 2001–2001

Personal details
- Died: 23 June 2019 Turkey
- Resting place: Garowe, Puntland
- Party: Independent

Yusuf Haji Nur (Somali: Yuusuf Xaaji Nuur, Arabic: يوسف حاجي نور; died June 2019) was a Somali politician and lawyer who served as Chief Justice of Puntland in 2001, and from 2016 to 2019. He was the acting President of Puntland in 2001.

== Biography ==
On 1 July 2001, Nur declared himself acting President of Puntland after the end of the presidential term of Abdullahi Yusuf Ahmed. However, the former President rejected Yusuf Haji's claim and insisted that he was the legitimate President, which led to a two-year civil war in Puntland. Yusuf served as interim President until 14 November 2001. During Nur's time as president he denied that the terrorist group Al-Itihaad al-Islamiya was active in Puntland. On 10 September 2001, several of Nur's former guards who were removed for misconduct attacked Nur's house and wounded three of his guards, but Nur was not present.

Nur became an independent lawyer and headed PARA LEGAL, a law firm for people who couldn't afford to pay for legal proceedings. On 16 August 2016, Puntland President Abdiweli Mohamed Ali appointed Nur as Chief Justice of the Puntland Supreme Court. Prior to this, Nur held this position under Abdullahi Yusuf Ahmed. On 21 August 2016, Yusuf took office.

== Death ==
In June 2019, Nur died in Turkey. On 23 June, Puntland President Said Abdullahi Dani expressed his condolences to the politician's close relatives and friends. Also expressing condolences on the death of Nur were the Director of information for the President of Somalia, Abdinur Mohamed Ahmed, and the speaker of the Puntland House of Representatives, Abdihakin Mohamed Ahmed Dhobo Daarid. He was buried on 28 June 2019.

Political offices
Preceded by Abdullahi Yusuf Ahmed	President of Puntland; July 2001–November 2001	Succeeded by Jama Ali Jama; Acting
