= Highway authority =

Organization that maintains roads

A highway authority is a government organization responsible for public roads.

== India ==
The National Highways Authority of India is the national authority for the management of a network of over 60,000 km of national highways in India. The Authority is a part of the Ministry of Shipping, Road Transport and Highways.

== Malaysia ==
Lembaga Lebuhraya Malaysia (LLM) or Malaysian Highway Authority is a government agency under the Malaysian Ministry of Works. The agency was founded in 1980 to build the North-South Expressway, but now the main function of Malaysian Highway Authority is to monitor the works and administration of expressways in Malaysia as subject to Federal Roads Act (Private Managements) 1984.

== Pakistan ==
The National Highway Authority is responsible for building and maintaining highways and motorways in Pakistan.

== Puntland ==
The Puntland Highway Authority is a government body, established by law no. 18, in the year 2000, in charge of road transportation and infrastructure and responsible for maintaining and developing the road network throughout in the autonomous state of Puntland.

== United Kingdom ==
In the United Kingdom a highway authority is an organisation that is responsible for the maintenance of public roads. The current role of a highway authority is defined in the Highways Act 1980 and the role is held by a large number of different groups.

=== Highway authorities in sub-national divisions ===
In England, Scotland, and Wales the highway authorities for trunk roads (which include most motorways) are, respectively, 'National Highways', 'Transport Scotland', and the Welsh Government.

For all other roads and public rights of way, the highway authority is usually the county council or unitary authority for a particular area. District councils may carry out some of the functions of a highway authority, but only when these have been delegated to them by their county council. Transport for London is the highway authority for all Greater London Authority roads (under the Highways Act 1980).

=== Duties ===
Duties of the highway authorities can include:

- Maintaining all highways classed as being "maintainable at public expense" that fall within their area of control.
- Maintaining records of all "highways maintainable at public expense" within their area of control.
- Regulating the activities of developers in relation to their highways.

== United States ==
In the U.S., a highway authority is now usually called a department of transportation, owing to the expanded responsibility for mass transport like passenger rail and even airports and ferry service. Some U.S. states also have separate highway authorities for toll roads, sometimes the responsibility of a regional government or metropolitan government rather than a state government.

For example, the Illinois State Toll Highway Authority is an instrumentality and administrative agency of the State of Illinois. The Authority has the power to collect and raise tolls, and is responsible for the maintenance and construction of tollway roads and related signage (including electronic message boards, used for driving-time notices, Amber alerts, and other notifications). The Authority also supervises and manages the seven Illinois Tollway oases (rest areas). The Illinois DOT manages other state roads.

== Greece ==
The National Road Construction Treasury (gr: Ταμείο Εθνικής Οδοποιίας) was in charge of the maintenance and operation of the national road network and the highway network until their gradual privatization by highway with the concession contract method at the end of the 2000s. Then it had under its responsibilities the undersea tunnel of Preveza-Aktio and the Malgara toll station. In 2013 it merged with state-owned company Egnatia Odos SA.
