= Buulo Togoro =

- Town
- Location in Somalia.
- Coordinates: 3°31′N 45°32′E
- Country: Somalia
- Region: Hiran
- Time zone: UTC+3 (EAT)

Buulo Togoro is a town in the central Hiran region of Somalia.
