= Dagaari =

- Town
- Location in Somalia
- Coordinates: 6°33′18″N 47°17′00″E
- Country: Somalia
- State: Galmudug
- Region: Mudug
- Time zone: UTC+3 (EAT)

Dagaari, also known as Balli Dagar Uen, is a town in the north-central Mudug region of Galmudug state of Somalia, located east of Banderadley.

A notable person from this town was General Abdiaziz Abdullahi (nicknamed Qooje Dagaari) who was the 21st division commander of the Somali National Army.
