= Hilmo =

- Town
- Location in Somalia.
- Coordinates: 6°18′N 47°15′E
- Country: Somalia
- Region: Galguduud
- Time zone: UTC+3 (EAT)

Hilmo is a town in the central Galguduud region of Somalia.
