= Lanwaley =

- Town
- Country: Somalia
- Region: Mudug
- Time zone: UTC+3 (EAT)

Lanwaley (Somali: Laanwaaleey) is a town in the north-central Mudug region of Somalia.
