= Hansholey =

- Town
- Country: Somalia
- Region: Middle Shabelle
- District: Jowhar
- Time zone: UTC+3 (EAT)

Hansholey is a town in the southeastern Middle Shabelle (Shabeellaha Dhexe) province of Somalia. It is located in the Jowhar District.
