= Hiloaxmadey =

- Town
- Location in Somalia.
- Coordinates: 2°58′N 45°31′E
- Country: Somalia
- Region: Hiran
- Time zone: UTC+3 (EAT)

Hiloaxmadey is a town in the central Hiran region of Somalia.
