= Jama Ali Jama =

Somali politician

Jama Ali Jama جامع علي جامع
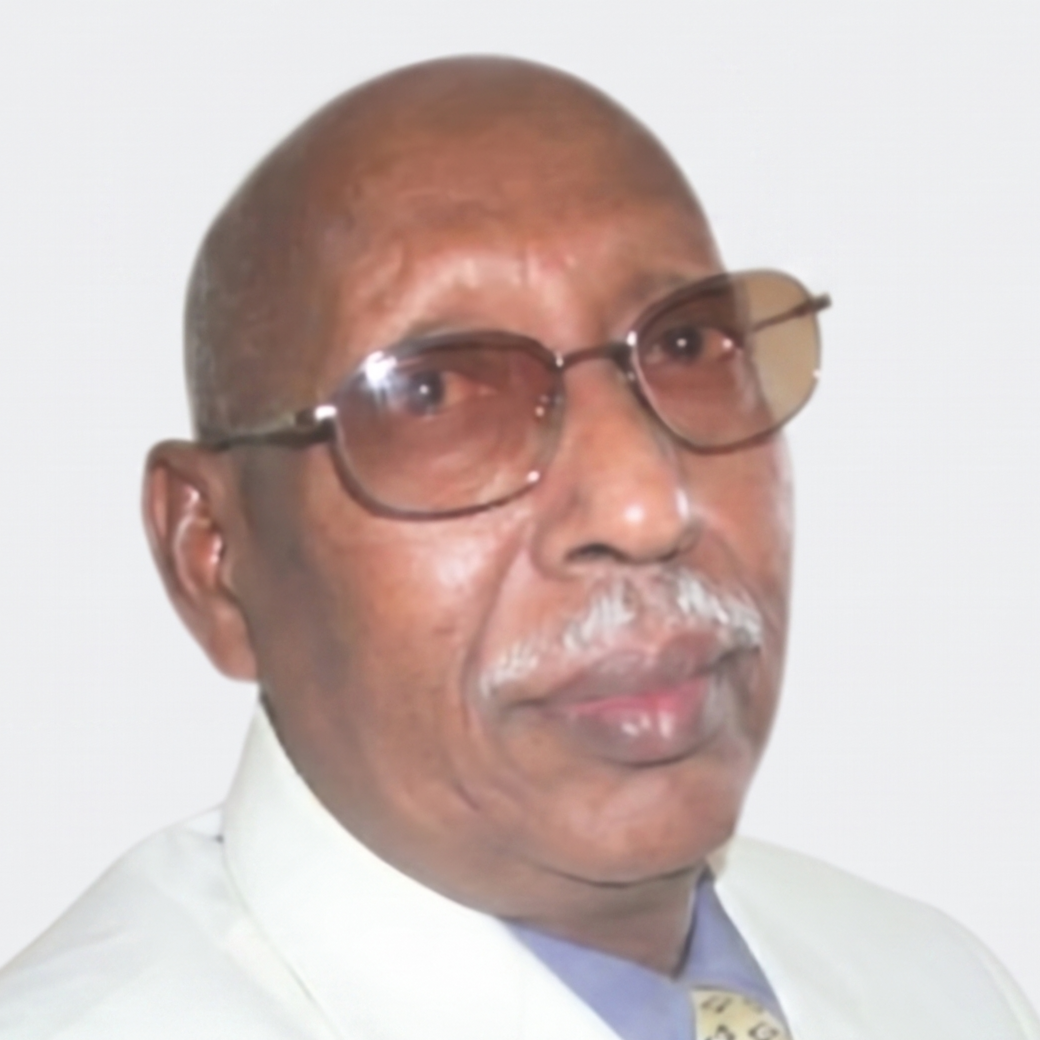

President of Puntland
- Disputed with Abdullahi Yusuf Ahmed
- In office 14 November 2001 – 8 May 2002
- Vice President: Ahmad Mahmud Gunle
- Preceded by: Yusuf Haji Nur
- Succeeded by: Abdullahi Yusuf Ahmed

Personal details
- Born: around 1939 Qardho,Somalia
- Died: 13 December 2025 London, UK
- Party: XHKS

Jama Ali Jama (Somali: Jaamac Cali Jaamac, Arabic: جامع علي جامع; born around 1939; died 13 December 2025) was a Somali politician. He was the President of Puntland from November 14, 2001, to May 8, 2002. The period of his presidency was overshadowed by the Puntland Crisis (2001–2002), which began after former president Abdullahi Yusuf Ahmed rejected Jama's election. In May 2002 he was forcibly deposed by Ethiopian troops seeking to install his political rival president.

== Early life ==
Jama was from the (Muse sultan) Osman Mahmoud sub-clan of the Majeerteen Darod. He was educated in Moscow and later joined the Somali National Army, rising to the rank of colonel.

== Career ==
In the mid-1970s, the Soviet Union promoted Jama as the chief ideologue of socialism in the Horn of Africa. He was later imprisoned for 11 years by the regime of Mohamed Siad Barre after having been accused of participating in an abortive coup d'état. Jama was recognized by Amnesty International as a prisoner of conscience.

In November 2001, Jama was elected as President of Puntland. However, the position was contested with outgoing President Abdullahi Yusuf Ahmed, who wanted his tenure extended.

Jama was deposed as president of Puntland in May 2002 when the Ethiopian army helped oust him in order to install Abdullahi Yusuf. Yusuf had used the "war on terror" to justify the operation and claimed Jama supported Al-Itihaad Al-Islamiya. Fighting broke out between forces loyal to Yusuf and Jama during January 2003.

Jama later became a legislator in the Transitional Federal Parliament.

== Death ==
On 13 December 2025, Jama died in London, United Kingdom. Several politicians, including Guled Salah Barre, a former Somali president Mohamed Abdullahi Farmajo, and Puntland’s incumbent president, Said Abdullahi Deni, expressed their condolences to the late politician’s close relatives and friends.
