= Bajela =

Coordinates: 5°47′10.92″N 47°42′13.85″E

- Town
- Interactive map of Bajela
- Country: Somalia
- Region: Mudug
- Time zone: UTC+3 (EAT)

Bajela (Somali: Bajeela) is a town in the north-central Mudug region of Somalia.
