= Gashanle =

- Town
- Country: Somalia
- Region: Middle Shabelle
- Time zone: UTC+3 (EAT)

Gashanle (Somali: Gaashaanle) is a town in the Middle Shabelle (Shabeellaha Dhexe) region of Somalia. It is located in the southeastern part of the country.
