= Berkad =

A berkad is a water reservoir used in arid areas to collect water during the wet season for use in the dry season. They occur mainly in Somalia and parts of Ethiopia.

== Construction and operation ==
Berkads were introduced to Somalia in the late 1950s. Most are large rectangular, elongated basins with vertical walls and a capacity of several hundred cubic metres (similar to the size of a swimming pool), sometimes three to four metres deep. The walls and bottom are often covered in brick and/or coated with cement to reduce water loss due to infiltration to groundwater. At the top, they are open but often covered with canvas to reduce evaporation, or (in poorer villages) with nets on which is laid anything that provides shade (branches, straw, etc.).

Berkads fill naturally in the rainy season. They are placed in locations where small streams form during rain, which are then routed to the berkad with dug trenches. A berkad can sometimes be filled in a few hours. In villages with poor water availability, feed channels can be a few kilometres long, and take the form proper canals coated with cement and/or covered. Berkads are often clustered together.

== Water quality ==
The inlet of the berkad often has a so-called "catch-pool": a small open reservoir that the water flows through before it enters the large basin. This allows a large part of the transported sediment to settle and other contaminants to be removed. The water in a berkad is nevertheless often turbid and muddy and can pose a health risk. One solution consists of making the tank airtight by constructing a sloping roof over the berkad, often with corrugated sheeting. Water evaporates, condenses on the underside of the roof, runs down into gutters and is collected in a separate metal tank, from which water can be used via handpump. This not only distills the water, but also reduces water losses due to evaporation. Such systems are, however, often too costly for villages to install themselves.

== Flow-on-impacts ==
The construction of berkads also has disadvantages. In the late 1950s there were only still only a few water points in the Haud, a vast steppe on the border of Somalia and Ethiopia of importance to nomads with their cattle. Nomads roamed according to a traditional seasonal migration and always had to take into account the number of days to walk to the next place where they could water their cattle. Around 2001 there were already around 7000 berkads in the Haud, such that the area is now permanently grazed. This overgrazing leads to ecological degradation and erosion. Settlements also arise around clusters of berkads, increasing population pressure.
