= Wisil =

Town in Mudug, Somalia

- Town
- Location in Somalia.
- Coordinates: 5°26′N 48°7′E
- Country: Somalia; Galmudug
- Region: Mudug
- Time zone: UTC+3 (EAT)

Wisil is a town in the north-central Mudug region of Somalia. It lies west of the city of Hobyo, on the road towards Galkacyo. The town is administered by the autonomous Galmudug state government.
