= Dangorayo =

Dangorayo Puntland, Somalia

Dangorayo Degmada Dangorayo Dal-raxmo
- City
- Location in Somalia.
- Coordinates: 8°43′40″N 49°20′30″E
- Country: Somalia
- State: Puntland
- Region: Nugal
- District: Dangorayo

Population (2005)
  - Total: 200,331
- Time zone: UTC+3 (EAT)

Dangorayo, a town in the northeastern Nugal region of Puntland Somalia. It is one of the four districts of Nugal region

== Demographics ==
The broader Dangorayo District has a total population of 57,331 residents.

== Education ==
Dangorayo has a number of academic institutions. According to the Puntland Ministry of Education, has a primary and schools. Among these are Kalyaxed, Hanad, Qundhed and Garmal. Secondary schools in the area include Taageer.

== Economy ==
In March 2015, the Ministry of Labour, Youth and Sports in conjunction with the European Union and World Vision launched the Nugal Empowerment for Better Livelihood Project in the Dangorayo, Garowe, Eyl, Godobjiran and Burtinle districts of Puntland. The three-year initiative is valued at $3 million EUR, and is part of the New Deal Compact for Somalia. It aims buttress the regional economic sector through business support, training and non-formal education programs, community awareness workshops, and mentoring and networking drives.
