= Qarxis =

- Town
- Location in Somalia
- Coordinates: 8°29′46″N 49°34′39″E
- Country: Somalia: Puntland
- Region: Nugal
- Time zone: UTC+3 (EAT)

Qarxis is a town in the Nugal province of the autonomous Puntland region in North Eastern Somalia.
