= Galkayo District =

Galkacyo Degmada Gaalkacyo
- District
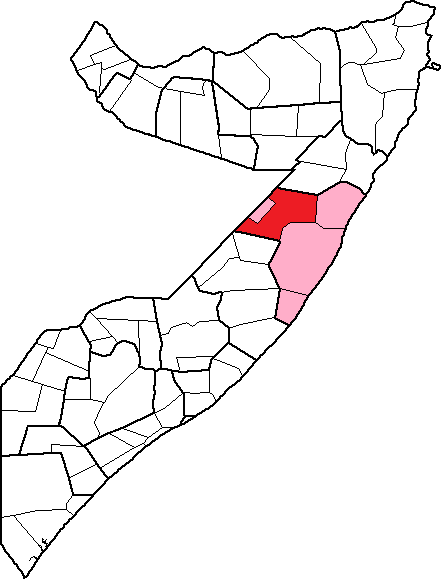
- Country: Somalia
- Region: Mudug
- Capital: Galkayo
- Regional State: Puntland; Galmudug
- Time zone: UTC+3 (EAT)

Galkayo District (Somali: Degmada Gaalkacyo) is a district in the north-central Mudug region of Somalia. Its capital is Galkayo.

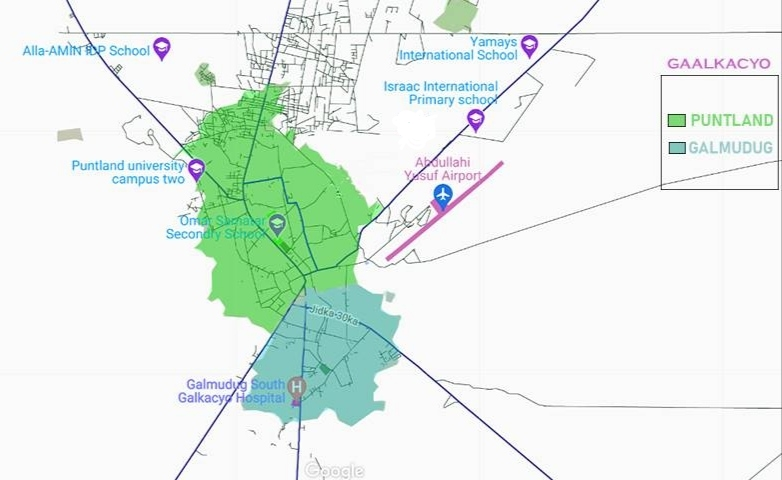
Galkayo City

== Notable people ==
- Mohamed Warsame Ali – first President of Galmudug, former Ambassador of Somalia to the US, former Minister of Commerce, Public Works, and Sports and Youth Affairs.
- Abduwali Muse — Pirate known for being the sole survivor of the original 4 pirates in the Maersk Alabama hijacking.
- Abdi Qeybdiid – former President of Galmudug, and former Interior Minister of Somalia.
- Dr. Abdinasir M. Abukar- an educated Somali who specialized in linguistics. His work on the variety of the Somali accents can be found here
- Mohamed Awale Liban, the designer of the Somali flag was born near Galkacyo in 1919. Receiving an Italian education, he was fluent in Italian and was later employed at the Bar Savoia in Mogadishu. He clerked under the governor of northeast Galkacyo (under the British Military Administration). He joined the Somali Youth League in the mid 1940s and in 1953 became a member of the central committee
- Mohamed Farrah Aidid, Chairman of the United Somali Congress that toppled Dictator Siad Barre, battled US Delta forces and UNOSOM during Operation Restore Hope and President of Somalia before his Death, 1987–1996
- Ahmed Duale Gelle - President of Galmudug, businessman and former federal MP.
- Mohamed Hassan Abdullahi, born in Galkacyo in 1942 was a Somali lawyer. Finished Primary School in Bardhere Teacher's Training College. Went to college at Hamar Law Studies. Went to the Soviet Union for military training(?) for 5 years (1964-1969) and was a teacher for 8 (1959-63, 1969-1971). He was in private legal practice for 1 year (1971-2). Additionally, he worked at the Supreme Revolutionary Council's Ideological Section for 2 years.
- Aden Abdulle, or Sahal Abdulle was born in Galkacyo in 1962. He is a photographer and worked for Reuters in 2007
- Abdirazak Haji Hussein was born in Galkacyo in 1924. He joined the Somali Youth League in 1944.
