= Burtinle =

Burtinle, Puntland, Somalia

- Town
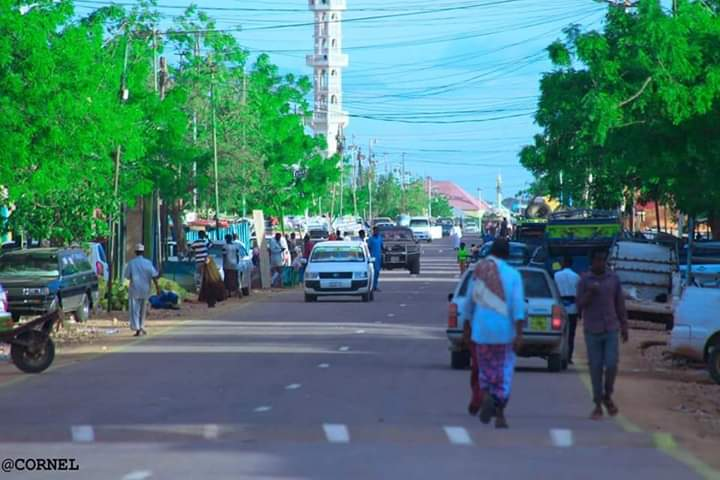
- Street in Burtinle.

- Location in Somalia
- Coordinates: 7°48′N 48°00′E
- Country: Somalia
- State: Puntland
- Region: Nugal
- District: Burtinle

Area
  - Total: 35 km^{2} (14 sq mi)
- Time zone: UTC+3 (EAT)

Burtinle (Somali: Buurtinle), also known as Bur Tinle or Buurtinleh, is a city in the Nugal region of Puntland.

== Overview ==
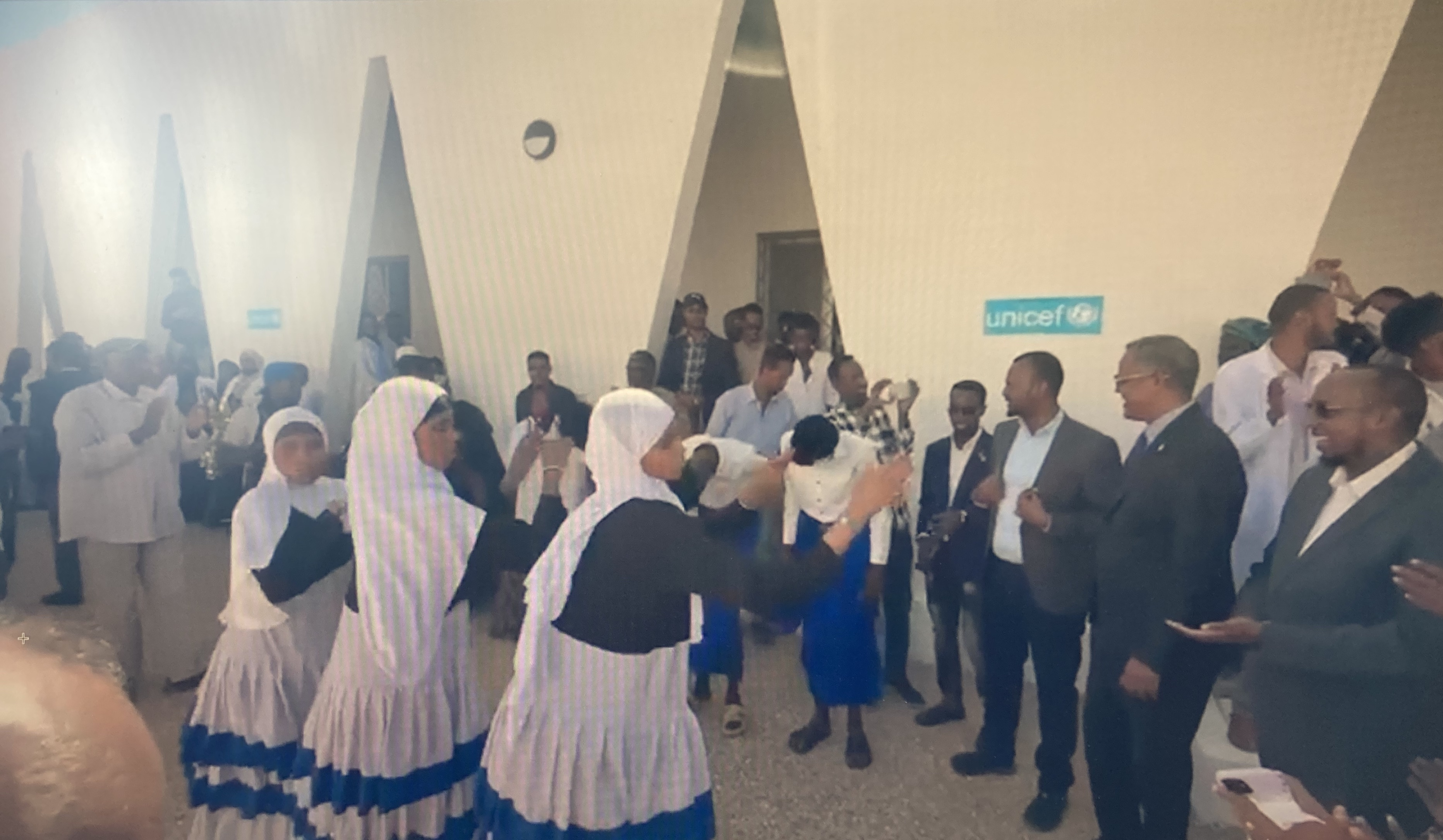
Opening Ceremony with Puntland State Minister of Health as guest of honor, 2023

Burtinle is the fourth district of Nugal region. It lies the southwest of Garowe the capital of Puntland. The city was established in the early 1920s by Ughaz Gelle Maxamed Kaneec. Burtinle consists of 7 neighborhoods namely: Tinka Dheer in which the city is named, Kaantaroolka, Booray, Tuulo Ciise, Xafatul Carab, Buur Karoole, and Godqol Weyne

== Education ==
Burtinle has a number of academic institutions. According to the Puntland Ministry of Education, there are currently 16 primary schools in the Burtinle District. Among these are Hormud, Imamu Shafici, Magacley and Meraysane. Secondary schools in the area include Burtinle High.

== Healthcare ==
Puntland Ministry of Health runs the District Hospital (Burtinle District Hospital) at the northern periphery of town. Its expansion funded by German Kreditanstalt für Wiederaufbau and managed by UNICEF was first completed in 2023 and extended in 2024-2025. The hospital departments include an Outpatient Department, an Emergency Department, Radiology, an Operational Theatre as well as a Maternity Ward. The hospital´s architectural design, prepared by East Africa based climate responsive architecture experts APC Architectural Pioneering Consultants responds to the hot and arid local climate through by a windcatcher natural ventilation system. It has been awarded with a number of international architectural honours.
