= Eyl District =

Historic town in Nugal, Somalia

Eyl
- District
- Location in Somalia.
- Coordinates: 7°58′00″N 49°51′00″E
- Country: Somalia
- Regional State: Puntland
- Region: Nugal
- Capital: Eyl

Population
  - Total: 32,345
- Time zone: UTC+3 (EAT)

Eyl District (Somali: Degmada Eyl) is a district in the northeastern Nugal region of Somalia. Its capital is Eyl.

== Overview ==
Eyl District was once a major hub for dervish movement in the early 1900s, with Sayid Mohamed Abdille Hassan operating in the area and using Eyl as a base to launch attacks on British and Italian colonies.

Eyl served as one of the coastal bases for the Dervish movement. It was strategically important because it allowed the Dervishes to receive supplies and weapons from the coast, which were crucial for sustaining their long-running resistance.

Today, Eyl is known for its beautiful coastline, fishing industry, and archaeological sites, including ancient cave paintings that attract researchers and tourists. The town's economy is primarily based on fishing and small-scale trade. Puntland's government has worked to establish better governance and security in the area to deter piracy and improve living conditions for residents.
