= Nugal, Somalia =

Region of Somalia

Nugaal River Nugaal River
- Region

- Flag Coat of arms

- Nugaal relief location map
- Coordinates: 8°45′34″N 48°53′21″E
- Country: Puntland
- Capital: Garowe

Government
  - Governor: Abdirahman Abshir Farah (24 June 2023)

Area
  - Total: 26,180 km^{2} (10,110 sq mi)
- Elevation: 1,650 m (5,410 ft)

Population (2019)
  - Total: 1,100,000
  - Density: 42/km^{2} (110/sq mi)
- Time zone: UTC+3 (EAT)
- Area code: +252
- ISO 3166 code: SO-NU
- HDI (2021): 0.378 low · 6th of 18

Nugal (Somali: Nugaal, Arabic: نوغال, Italian: Nogal), traditionally known as Nugaaleed-Bari or Bari-Nugaal meaning eastern Nugaal, or Nugaal xaggeeda hoose meaning lower Nugaal, is an administrative region (gobol) in northern Somalia.

== Overview ==
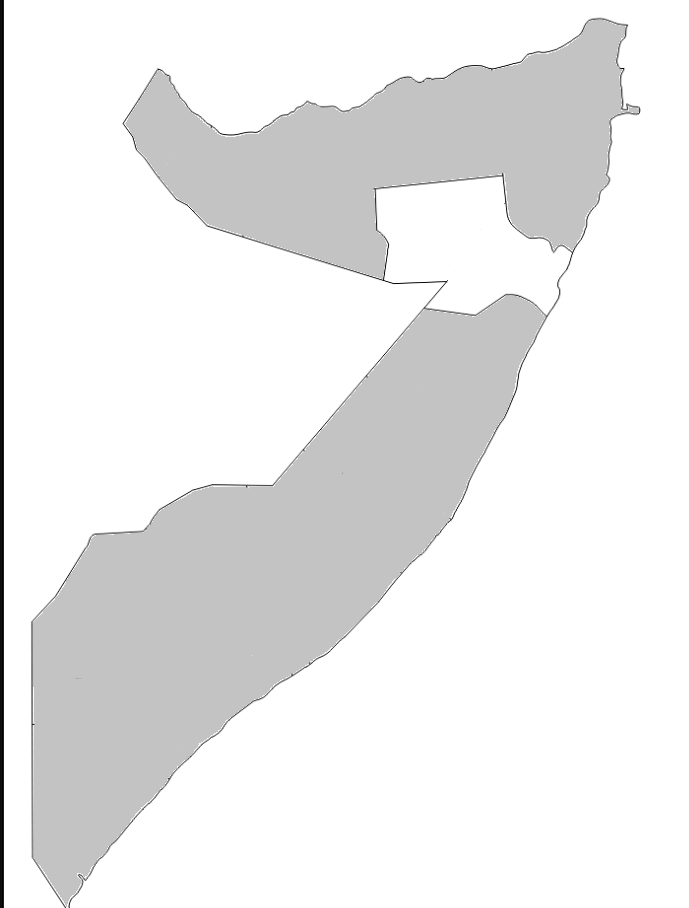
Nugaal in the 1970s (colored white) was merged with Sool province

It is bordered by Sool and the Somali Region of Ethiopia to the west, Bari to the north, and Mudug to the south. The Somali Sea flanks the province to the east. During the 1970s, Nugaal was merged with Sool province as a single province called Nugaal. According to Jaamac Cumar Ciise, the eastern parts of the Nugaal are called Nugaal xaggeeda hoose or Nugaal xeebeheeda hoose, meaning lower Nugaal and lower coastal Nugaal respectively. Segments of the Nugaal wadi's estuary and its hinterlands that coalesce with the modern Nugaal province were also historically called Nugaal xeebeheeda and Afaafka Nugaal.

Nugal is centered on Garowe, which serves as the capital of the autonomous Puntland macro-region. The segments of the Nugaal valley from Garowe eastwards is traditionally referred to as Bari-Nugaaleed or Bari-Nugaal, whilst segments of the valley which converge into the Iyah plains are called Jednugaal. Nonetheless, Nugaal proper traditionally refers to segments of the valley west of Garowe.

== Garowe ==
Nugal is centered on Garowe, which serves as the capital of the autonomous Puntland macro-region. A major geographic feature of the region is the Nugaal Valley, a large shallow drainage basin fed by the Nugal and Dheer seasonal rivers during the April–June rainy season. The region was established on 8 February 1973.

== Kobo ==
Towards the east, Nugaal Valley is separated from Nugaaleed-Bari via the region known as Kobo. Kobo was described in colonial sources ruminating about Dervish strength as follows:

During all this time the Mullah and the majority of his karias (tribal encampments) had remained in the Eastern Nogal, in the area known as Kobo, roughly comprised in the triangle Halin, Gerrowei, Kallis. His strategical position here was a very strong one. It was secure from any possible danger of surprise, and he commanded the main routes to the south

— Colonel Kenna

== Districts ==
The Nugal region consists of five districts:

- Burtinle District
- Dangorayo District
- Eyl District
- Garowe District (Administrative capital)
- Godobjiran District

== Major towns ==
City, Town, Village in Nugaal.
Ta=Taleex, Bu=Burtinle, Bu=Budunbuuto, Da=Dangorayo, Ey=Eyl, Ga=Garoowe, Go=Godobjiran, Go=Gori Rit, Ha=Hamur, Ja=Jallam, Ra=Rabaable, Qa=Qarxis
- Burtinle
- Dangorayo
- Eyl
- Garowe
