= Jariban District =

Jariban
- District
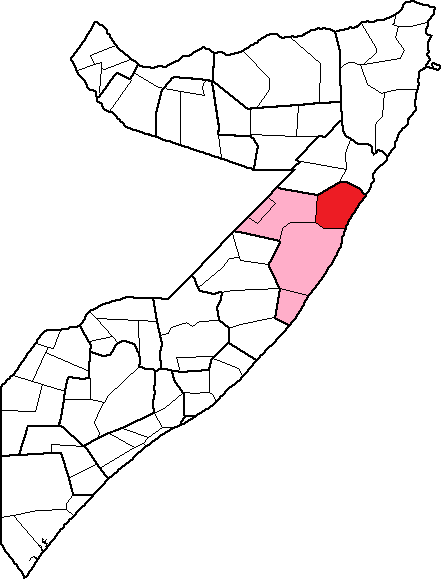
- Country: Somalia
- Regional State: Puntland
- Region: Mudug
- Capital: Jariban
- Time zone: UTC+3 (EAT)

Jariban District (Somali: District Jariiban) is a district in the north-central Mudug region of Somalia. Its capital is Jariban. The port town of Garacad is also located in this district.
