= Somali Salvation Democratic Front =

Paramilitary organization, 1978 to 2001

- Jabhadda Badbaadinta Dimuqraadiyada Soomaaliya
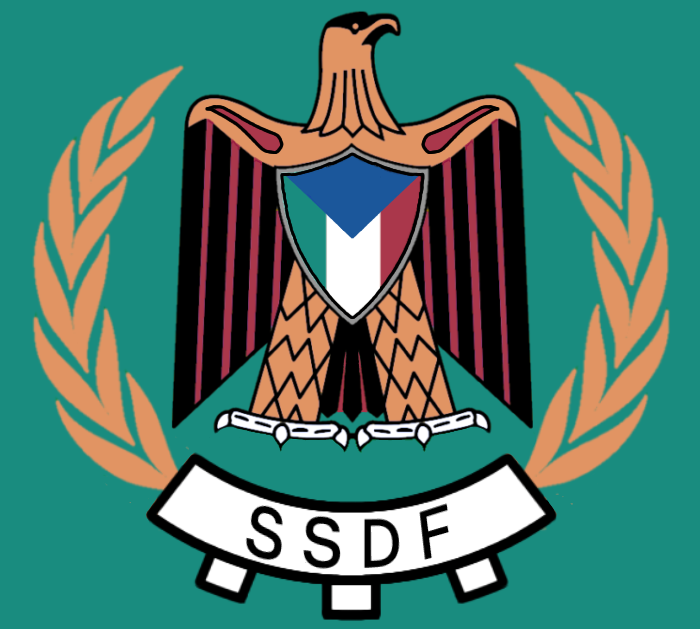
- Emblem
- Leaders: Mohamed Abshir Muse (1991–1998); Muuse Islan Farah (1987–1988), Abdullahi Yusuf Ahmed (1978–1986, 1991–1998); Mohamed Abshir Waldo (1984–1986); Hassan Ali Mire (1986–1988)
- Dates active: 1978–1998
- Group: Majeerteen (1978–2001)
- Active regions: Somali Democratic Republic
- Ideology: Anti-Barre; Somali nationalism Socialism; Majeerteen interests
- Wars: Somali Civil War

Somali Salvation Democratic Front (SSDF) (Somali: Jabhadda Diimuqraadiga Badbaadinta Soomaaliyeed), initially known as the Democratic Front for Salvation of Somalia, was a political and paramilitary umbrella organization in Somalia. Founded in 1978 by several army officers, it was the first of several opposition groups dedicated to ousting the authoritarian regime of Mohamed Siad Barre. With its power base mainly within the Majeerteen clan, SSDF played a significant role in the country's complex political landscape under the leadership of Abdullahi Yusuf during the late 1970s and 2000s.

In 1982, it participated in attempted invasion of Somalia aimed at regime change with the support of Ethiopia. The joint 1982 offensive backfired as it ultimately consolidated Barre’s control. Amnesty and financial incentives prompted the majority of SSDF fighters to surrender and rejoin the regime in 1983. The organization fragmented under government pressure.

The SSDF would go on to have disputes with the Derg, particularly over the Ethiopian government's claims of sovereignty over several Somali-inhabited areas such as the Balanbale and Galdogob districts. This would culminate in the arrest of the groups leader Abdullahi Yusuf in 1985. The SSDF later re-emerged in the 1990s during the Somali Civil War, actively participating in reconciliation efforts. It helped to establish the autonomous Puntland state in northeastern Somalia in 1998.

== Early history ==
On October 15, 1969, while paying a visit to the northern town of Las Anod, Somalia's then President Abdirashid Ali Shermarke was shot dead by a policeman in his security team. His assassination was quickly followed by a military coup d'état on October 21, 1969 (the day after his funeral), in which the Somali Army and police force seized power without encountering armed opposition — essentially a bloodless takeover. The putsch was spearheaded by Major General Mohamed Siad Barre, who at the time commanded the army. For refusing to support Barre's seizure of power, numerous political figures were imprisoned. Among these was Abdullahi Yusuf Ahmed, Somalia's former military attaché to Moscow, who was imprisoned for several years by the new military regime.

The defeat of the Somali military at the hands of Cuban/Ethiopian forces during the Ogaden War of 1977–78 brought to the surface opposition elements within the armed forces. Another significant consequence of the war was the massive influx of refugees from the Ogaden into Somalia, estimated at over a million.

=== Post-April 1978 coup and SSDF formation ===
The first serious postwar challenge to the regime came during an attempted coup in April 1978. The officers were primarily from the Majeerteen clan, and many of the coup plotters fled to Ethiopia after the Somali government had put down the insurrection. During the Ogaden War, Colonel Abdullahi Yusuf had served as a commander in the Somali National Army. After the war he deserted the army, and helped lead the failed 1978 coup attempt following which he had immediately fled to Ethiopia. In response to the coup, harsh reprisals were carried out by the government on the Majeerteen clan.

In Ethiopia, Abdullahi Yusuf setup base for a new rebel organization called the Somali Salvation Democratic Front which he led and soon after began fighting with Ethiopian forces against the Somali army. The SSDF possessed little autonomy over Ethiopian security forces, as it was 'created, organized, trained and financed by Ethiopia'. With the formation of the SSDF in Ethiopia, the era of armed opposition against the Barre regime had begun. The SSDF was formally created in Aden, South Yemen in October 1981 through the merger of three groups, Somali Salvation Front, Somali Workers Party and the Democratic Front for the Liberation of Somalia. The SSF had previously absorbed its predecessor the Somali Democratic Action Front. An 11-member Central Committee was constituted and some former members of the Somali Revolutionary Socialist Party were part of the leadership of the new group. A military structure was built up, supported by Ethiopia and Libya.

=== Proxy operations and 1982-83 invasion ===
The Ethiopian government began using the Somali Salvation Democratic Front as a proxy to help hunt down Western Somali Liberation Front (WSLF) fighters. In August 1980, the Derg regime launched a massive anti-insurgency campaign known as "Operation Lash" to clear the Ogaden of insurgents. During these operations the Ethiopians used the SSDF rebels to attack WSLF camps within Somalia. With Ethiopian assistance, the SSDF began to launch guerilla attacks across the border on Somali army bases and civilian targets.

The Ethiopian army intended to us the Somali Salvation Democratic Front to overthrow Barre and install a friendly regime. The guerrillas were trained by Ethiopian officers and during the 1982 invasion of Somalia, SSDF forces were directly integrated into much larger Ethiopian army units. In late June 1982, 15,000 Ethiopian army troops and thousands of SSDF rebels invaded Somalia in the Hiran and Mudug region. The offensives initially aimed for Galkayo in the north-east, and Beledweyne in central Somalia. According to Gérard Prunier, "The plan was to cut Somalia into two by driving the troops all the way to the ocean, but the plan backfired." In spite of losses taken four years earlier during 1978 from the Ethiopian-Cuban counter offensive during the Ogaden War, the Somali army had regrouped and the invasion led to a large increase in volunteers joining the army. The Ethiopian/SSDF attack had played out to Barres advantage, as his declining regime found a significant upsurge in support. The Ethiopian and SSDF forces never reached their objectives of Galkayo and Beledweyne, but were instead halted to a stalemate at border towns of Balanbale and Galdogob.

=== Decline and resurgence ===
During 1982, the Barre regime successfully split the SSDF and most its members surrendered to the government following an amnesty and payment offer. By 1983 the bulk of the SSDF had rejoined the regime. Irritated by this development, the Ethiopian government put the head of the SSDF Abdullahi Yusuf in jail, where he remained until the Fall of the Derg regime in 1991. During SSDF internal fighting during 1983 and 1984, Ethiopian security forces entered their camps and arrested the rebels central committee members. After the rebels had no longer become useful to Mengistu, he had members of the organization killed, imprisoned or dispersed. The SSDF would not recover as an organization until relations with Ethiopia normalized during the tenure of Meles Zenawi.

By 1985 SSDF had ceased most of their military operations against the Siad Barre regime. In 1986 an SSDF congress was held, which elected Dr. Hassan Ali Mire as chairman. He resigned in 1988, leaving a power vacuum in the organization. Musse Islan was elected leader by the SSDF Central Committee to hold the position until a Congress was convened.

In 1988 the governments of Somalia and Ethiopia made some agreements to cease hostilities. The Ethiopian government started closing SSDF camps, arresting its leaders and seizing weapons. The Ethiopian government also closed the SSDF radio station, Radio Halgan, which had been broadcasting since 1981.

In 1988 SSDF guerrillas started taking control over the western districts of Mudug and the southern areas of Nugaal and Bari regions.

== Post-1991 ==
After the fall of the Barre regime, the SSDF (based largely in northeastern Somalia) was divided in two factions. One was led by General Mohamed Abshir Muse (chairman), who at the time was based in Saudi Arabia, and the other was led by Abdullahi Yusuf Ahmed (deputy chairman). The general secretary was Mohamed Abshir Waldo.

A congress was held in August 1994. Former Prime Minister of Somalia, Abdirizak Haji Hussein, was offered the chairmanship of the SSDF by a group of clan leaders, but declined.

Over the next several years, Abdullahi Yusuf Ahmed would emerge as the pre-eminent leader in northeastern Somalia. In 1992, he marshalled forces to successfully expel an Islamist extremist group linked to Al-Itihaad al-Islamiya that had taken over Bosaso, a prominent port city and the commercial capital of the northeastern part of the country.

== Notable personnel ==
- Abdullahi Yusuf Ahmed
- Mohamed Abshir Muse
- Mohamed Abshir Waldo
- Hassan Ali Mire
- Hirsi Ali Magan
- Said Mohamed Hersy
- Abdullahi Muhamed Ahmed Afgab

== Puntland ==
In 1998, a homegrown constitutional conference was held in Garowe over a period of three months. Attended by SSDF representatives, traditional elders (Issims), members of the business community, intellectuals and other civil society members, the autonomous Puntland State of Somalia was subsequently officially established so as to deliver services, offer security, facilitate trade, and interact with both domestic and international partners. Abdullahi Yusuf Ahmed was appointed as the nascent polity's first President.

After serving two terms as President of Puntland, Abdullahi Yusuf Ahmed was elected in 2004 as President of the Transitional Federal Government (TFG), an interim federal administrative body that he had helped establish earlier in the year.
