= Bur Salah =

Bur Salah Bur Saalax Burar
- Town
- Location within Somalia
- Coordinates: 7°10′34″N 47°14′42″E
- Country: Somalia
- State: Puntland
- Region: Mudug

Area
  - Total: 9.3 sq mi (24 km^{2})
- Time zone: UTC+3 (EAT)

Bur Salah is a town in the north-central Mudug region of Somalia. It is situated between Beyra and Rigomane.

== Transportation ==
A highway connects Bur Salah with Galkayo, the capital of the Mudug region.

== Education ==
Bur Salah currently has one primary and one secondary institutions, as well as many Islamic schools (madrassahs).
