= 1982 Ethiopian–Somali Border War =

Ethiopian invasion of Somalia

Ethiopian–Somali Border War
- Part of the Ethiopian–Somali conflict and the Somali Rebellion
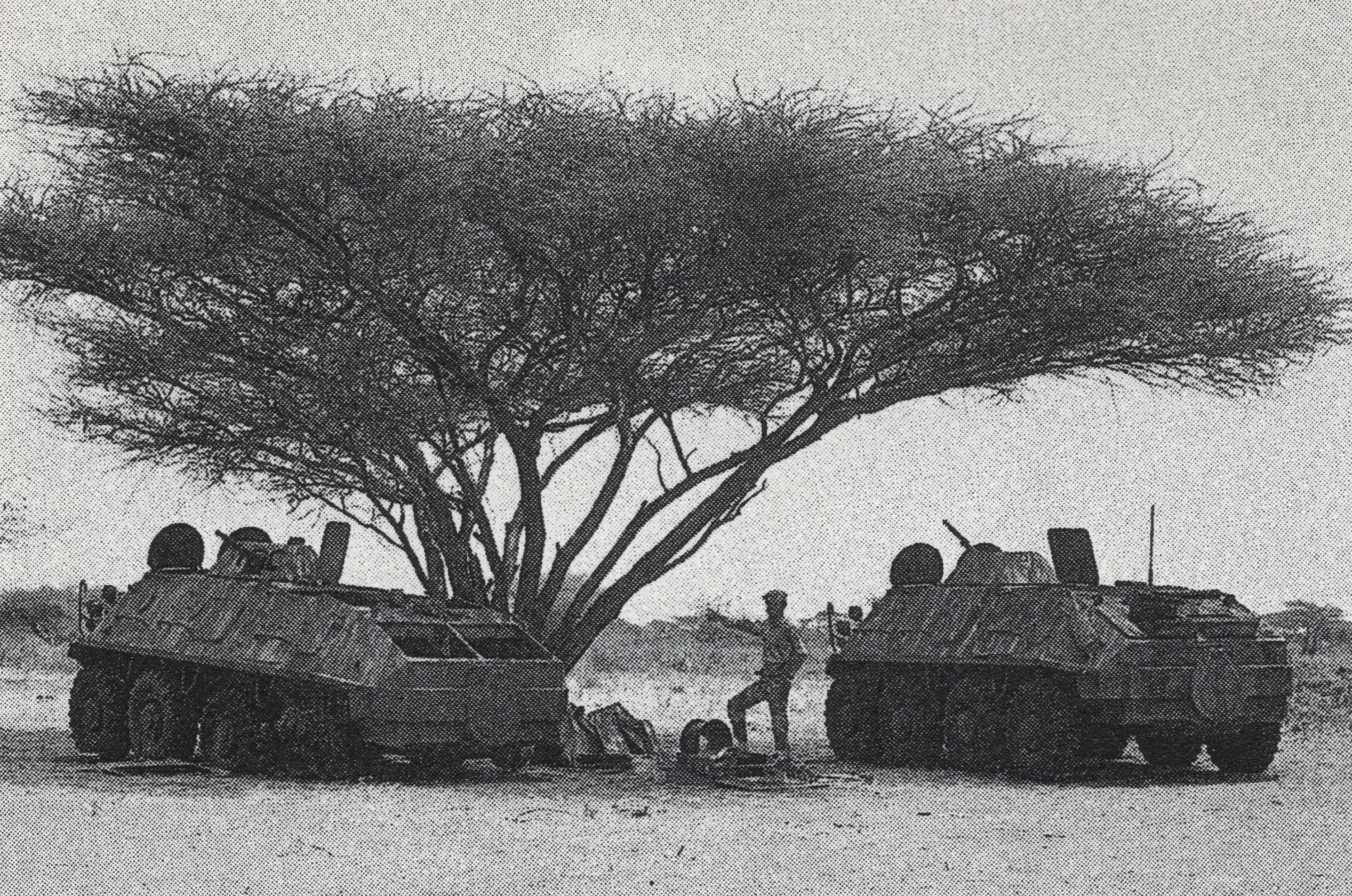
- Somali National Army soldier stands between two captured Ethiopian BTR-60 armored carriers that were disabled in battle
Date	June 1982 – August 1983 (1 year, 2 months)
Location	Hiran and Mudug regions, Somalia
Result	Somali defensive victory: Ethiopian invasion repulsed; Stalemate at border towns of Galdogob and Balanbale; Upsurge in domestic support for Somali President Siad Barre; United States delivers emergency military aid to Somalia
Territorial changes	Ethiopian army and SSDF temporarily occupy the border towns of Galdogob and Balanbale

Belligerents
Ethiopia; SSDF	Somalia

Commanders and leaders
Mengistu Haile Mariam; Abdullahi Yusuf	(Somalia) Siad Barre (Somalia) Ali Samatar (Somalia) Yusuf Ahmed Salhan (Somalia) Mohamed Farrah Aidid

Strength
10,000-15,000 Ethiopian soldiers 2,000–5,000 SSDF militia	2,500 Somali National Army soldiers

Casualties and losses
383 killed, 998 wounded (Ethiopian claim)	3,506 killed, over 9,500 wounded (Ethiopian claim)

The Ethiopian–Somali Border War took place from June 1982 to August 1983, when Ethiopia launched a large-scale invasion of central Somalia. Backed by warplanes and armored units, Ethiopia deployed a 10,000-man force alongside thousands of Somali Salvation Democratic Front (SSDF) rebels.

The operation initially aimed to advance all the way to the Somali coastline and ultimately overthrow the Barre regime. Despite their efforts, Ethiopian troops and SSDF guerrillas failed to capture the key cities of Galkayo and Beledweyne, as the Somali army successfully repelled the main assault. However, the conflict soon devolved into a military stalemate around the border towns of Galdogob and Balanbale.

By late 1982, Ethiopian troops had established entrenched positions 30 km across the Ethiopia–Somalia border. The invasion ultimately played to the advantage of Somali President Siad Barre, whose regime saw a surge in domestic support.

== Background ==
After World War II, leaders in the Somali inhabited Ogaden region of the Ethiopian Empire repeatedly put forward demands for self-determination, only to be ignored by both Emperor Haile Sellasie and the United Nations. Following territorial transfers by the British in the mid-1950s, Ethiopia for the first time established control over the Ogaden and began incorporating it into the empire. Following Somalia's independence in 1960, the Ogaden was rocked by waves of popular revolts which were brutally repressed. During this period, the Somali Republic and the Ethiopian Empire were on the verge of full-scale war over the issue, particularly in 1961 and in the border war of 1964.

During the 1977–78 Ogaden War, Somalia attempted to assist the Western Somali Liberation Front in regaining control of the Ogaden region by launching an invasion. Backed by Soviet weaponry and Cuban reinforcements, Ethiopia regained control of the region in early 1978. This resulted in the mass exodus of hundreds of thousands of Somali men and women immigrating from the Ogaden region to the Somali borders. Somalia, despite losing the war, never recognized the international border that places the Ogaden region.

Following the Soviet Union's change of allegiance from Somalia to Ethiopia in 1978, the United States became allies with Somalia. The U.S. originally was aligned with Ethiopia but stopped supplying and equipping the country with support and aid. The U.S. originally thought that in the long-term Ethiopia would be a more valuable ally due to its geographical position, its size and influence. Somalia and Ethiopia being in close proximity to western oil routes, piqued the interests of both the U.S. and the Soviet Union.

=== 1978 coup and SSDF ===
During the Ogaden War, Colonel Abdullahi Yusuf had served as a commander in the Somali National Army. After the war he deserted the army, and led the failed 1978 coup attempt following which he had immediately fled to Ethiopia.

In Ethiopia, Yusuf set up base for a new rebel organization called the Somali Salvation Democratic Front (SSDF) which he led and soon after began fighting with Ethiopian forces against the Somali army. The SSDF possessed little autonomy over Ethiopian security forces, as it was 'created, organized, trained and financed by Ethiopia'. The guerrillas were trained by Ethiopian officers and during the 1982 invasion, SSDF forces were directly integrated into much larger Ethiopian army units.

== Forces involved ==
In 1982, approximately 10,000 to 15,000 Ethiopian troops, equipped with Soviet-supplied MiG fighters and T-55 tanks, launched an invasion. They were accompanied by 2,000 to 5,000 Somali Salvation Democratic Front (SSDF) rebels, who were similarly armed with tanks and received support from Ethiopian artillery and air forces.

The Somali National Army (SNA) committed only 2,500 troops to the border battle. The commander of the Somali forces defending the border regions was General Yusuf Ahmed Salhan, and his subordinate, Brigadier General Mohammed Farah Aidid, who commanded the central sector military zone. Western diplomatic sources estimated the SNA's overall total strength to be around 50,000 at the outset of the campaign. The SNA was severely under-equipped and ill-prepared for conflict following serious losses in early 1978 at the end of the Ogaden War. The Somali army suffered significant ammunition and communications equipment shortages, all while lacking both anti-tank and anti-aircraft weaponry.

== Border war ==
In late June 1982, 15,000 Ethiopian army troops and thousands of SSDF rebels invaded across the border in the Hiran and Mudug region. The offensives initially aimed for Galkayo in the north-east, and Beledweyne in central Somalia. According to Gérard Prunier, "The plan was to cut Somalia into two by driving the troops all the way to the ocean, but the plan backfired." The Ethiopian army intended to us the SSDF to overthrow Barre and install a friendly regime.

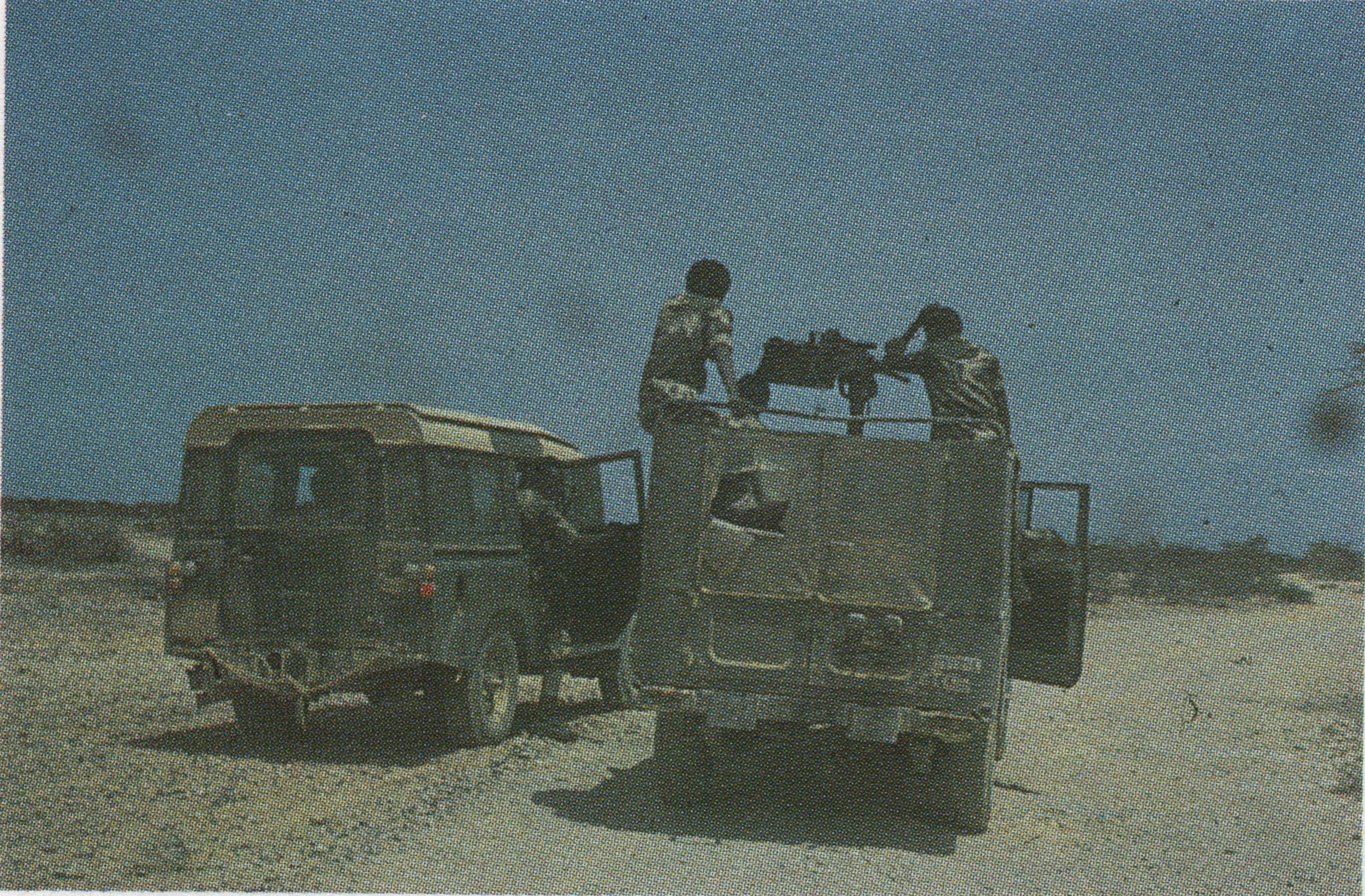
A field officer with the Somali National Army stops his Land Rover while carrying out a reconnaissance mission to observe advancing Ethiopian armor near Galdogob (1982)

The invasion was launched on the night on 30 June 1982. The first offensive came at the border town of Ferfer near Beledweyne, in an attempt to capture the high ground overlooking a vital roadway connecting north and south Somalia. Initially the Somali army only had 1,800 troops in the region where the invasion occurred but were soon reinforced. Despite heavy ground and air attacks, the Somali army garrison stationed nearby at the town of Beledweyne inflicted heavy losses on the invading forces and repulsed the Ethiopians. Soon after a stalemate ensued. Over the following month armed conflicts were reported in almost all border regions, including Gedo, Bakool, Hiiraan, Mudug and Toghdeer. The SSDF claimed responsibility for all these attacks, an assertion deemed implausible given the group's limited military capacity and its primarily localized operations near Galkayo in the Mudug region.

The next incursion occurred further north at Balanbale. On 10 July 1982, the Ethiopians launched an offensive on the town, surprising and overrunning the defenders. An Ethiopian armored column of 30 to 45 T-55 tanks backed by two artillery battalions overran the town and advanced 11 km into Somalia. The Somali army commander at the town of El Dhere organized a counter-attack and pushed the offensive back to 3 km outside Balanbale. The Ethiopians held and fortified the town. Limited confrontations took place at several other points further north, while the Ethiopian Air Force bombed and strafed Galkayo airport. During an air attack on Galkayo, the Somalis reported downing an Ethiopian MiG.

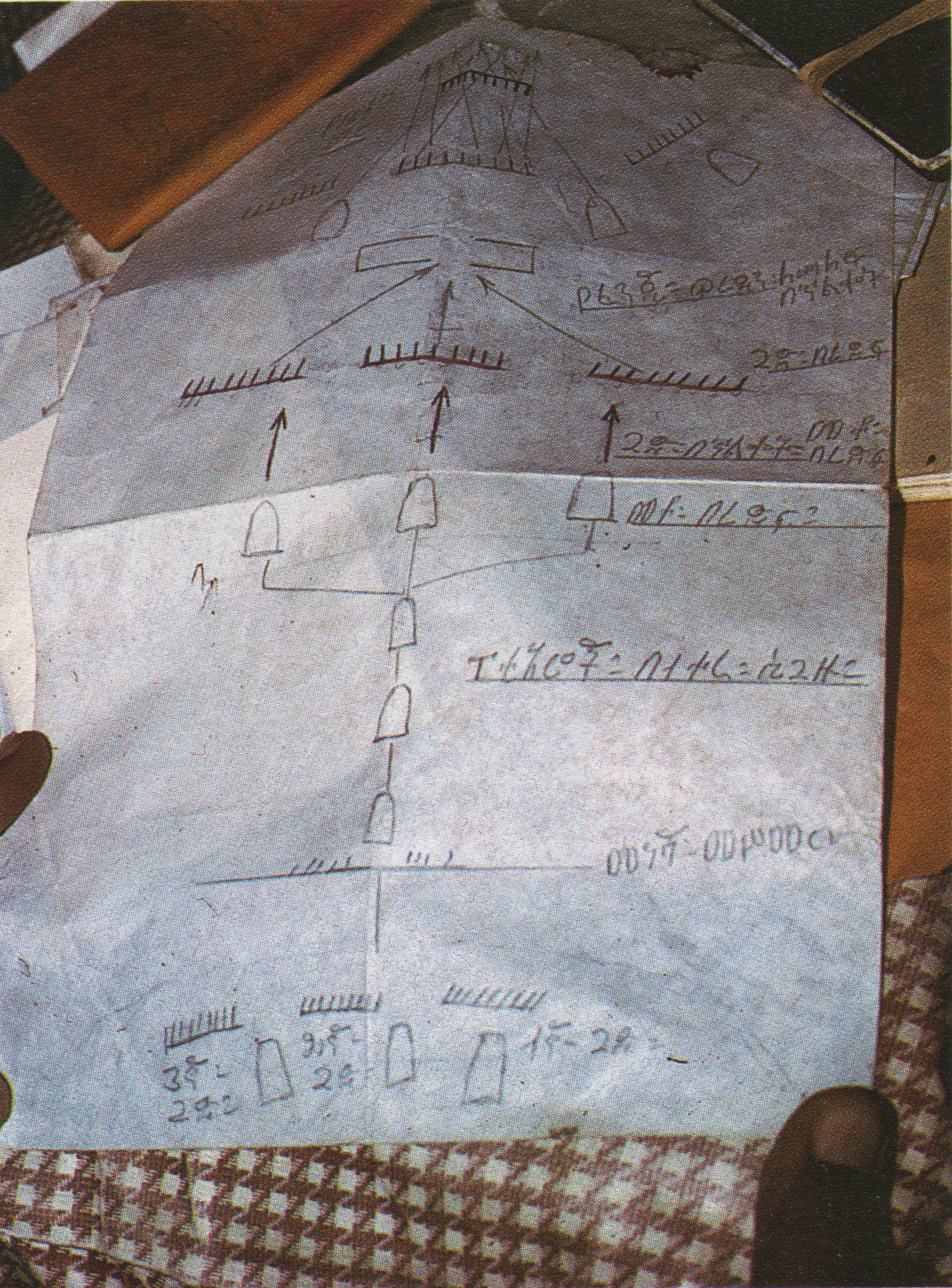
Ethiopian officer's notes for a June 1982 offensive, analyzed by Somali Army intelligence. Symbols at the page's base depict three divisions at a start line. In Amharic, notes mention BTRs moving in line, 100 troops per row, advancing in depth through a mined area before attacking. The document was captured in a failed assault.

To the surprise of many observers, the invasion was vigorously repulsed by the Somali National Army. In spite of losses taken four years earlier during 1978 from the Ethiopian-Cuban counter offensive during the Ogaden War, the Somali army had regrouped and the invasion led to a large increase in volunteers joining the army. The Ethiopian/SSDF attack had played out to Barres advantage, as his declining regime found a significant upsurge in support.

The Ethiopian and SSDF forces never reached their objectives of Galkayo and Beledweyne, but were instead halted to a stalemate at border towns of Balanbale and Galdogob. This marked the first time since independence that Ethiopian troops successfully held territory over the border. The SSDF denied the presence of Ethiopian troops in Somalia, an assertion was disputed by foreign diplomats who observed that the SSDF had given only 'token participation' to the operation. The Somali rebels operating with Ethiopian troops primarily operated as reconnaissance.

It was persistently rumored the Barre had allowed the occupation of the two towns in order to drum up a case for further foreign military aid deliveries. After the seizure of Balanbale and Galdogob, Siad Barre and his government declared a state of emergency. In front of SSDF personnel, including the group's chairman Abdullahi Yusuf, the Ethiopian army commander ordered his troops to raise the Ethiopian flag over the occupied towns. Disputes began between the SSDF and Ethiopian forces, who consequently began eliminating SSDF officials.

During September 1982 there was further heavy fighting near Balanbale, which continued into October. Over the following months sporadic skirmishes continued. By the end of 1982, some Ethiopian forces entrenched 32 km over the border. In mid-June 1983 the Somali army repelled a large-scale Ethiopian offensive at Galdogob, inflicting heavy losses. During July and August 1983, the Ethiopian army launched further incursions in central and northern Somalia that were also repulsed.

== Foreign Support ==
Barre appealed for western military aid to repel the invasion, but received most arms during December 1982. The arms included anti-tank and anti-air weaponry, along with some US Patton tanks. By August 1982, apart from several radios, no American military had appeared on the front. Only in the aftermath of the conflict was US military aid to Somalia significantly increased. The United States sped up the delivery of light arms which had been previously offered in 1980. US military assistance to Somalia rose from US$20 million in 1981 to US$51 million in 1983. From 1979 to 1983, Somalia had imported US$30 million worth of American arms. While the conflict had attracted the attention of the Reagan administration, the US response was delayed as the conflict was overshadowed by the 1982 Israeli Invasion of Lebanon and the Iran–Iraq War. On the day Barre had informed Washington about the invasion (July 16), Iran had launched a major counteroffensive against Iraq. China delivered fighter jets at the end of 1982 to cover heavy losses taken during the Ogaden War. As a result of the 1982 invasion, the Somali Army later adopted the US FIM-43 Redeye surface-to-air missile.

No foreign troops were known to be directly engaged in the fighting during 1982, though the Ethiopians saw Cuban and South Yemeni military assistance confined at the division level. At the time of the invasion, 10,000 Cuban troops along with 3,000 Soviet and East German military advisers were deployed in the Somali Ogaden region. On several occasions, Somali army technicians and intelligence officers intercepted Spanish and Russian radio traffic during Ethiopian military operations.

== Aftermath ==
Following the border war, President Siad Barre received some verbal support at the Arab League summit in 1982. But ultimately year after year Somalia was challenged by war and economic trouble. Newly formed regional clan and guerrilla groups revolted and challenged the Siad Barre government. Because of the invasion, Barres shaky hold on power during 1982 was temporarily strengthened.

During 1982, the Somali government successfully split the ranks of the SSDF and most its members surrendered following an amnesty and payment offer. By 1983 the bulk of the SSDF had rejoined the regime. Irritated by this development, the Ethiopian government put then head of the SSDF Abdullahi Yusuf in jail, where he remained until the Fall of the Derg regime in 1991. During SSDF internal fighting during 1983 and 1984, Ethiopian security forces entered their camps and arrested the rebels central committee members. After the rebels had no longer become useful to Mengistu, he had members of the organization killed, imprisoned or dispersed. The SSDF did not recover as an organization until relations with Ethiopia normalized during the tenure of Meles Zenawi. The SSDF was primarily composed of the Majerteen clan and following the invasion the government carried out reprisals against civilians from the clan in Mudug, Nugaal and Bari regions. The reprisals included the raising of several villages and the destruction of water reservoirs.

== See also ==
- First Ethiopian–Somali War (1964)
- Ogaden War (1977–1978)
- Ethiopian War in Somalia (2006–2009)
