= Leelkase =

Somali sub-clan of Darod

Leelkase ليلكسة
- Darod Somali Clan
- Ethnicity: (Somalia) Somali
- Location: Somalia
- Descended from: Hussein bin Abdirahman bin Isma'il al-Jabarti
- Parent tribe: Tanade
- Branches: Musa Ali: Fiqi Ali; Yusuf; Osman; Omar Osman; Fiqi Ismail; Adan Osman; Mohammed Adan; Mumin Adan; Idris Osman; Mahamud Ali
- Language: (Somalia) Somali (Arab League) Arabic
- Religion: Sunni Islam

The Leelkase or Lailkase or Lelkase (Somali: Laylkase, Arabic: ليلكسة) (Hussein bin Abdirahman bin Is'mail bin Ibrahim al Jaberti) is a major subclan of the Tanade Darod clan.

== Etymology ==
The term "Leelkase" is a nickname of the clan progenitor, Shuayb Diftire, which translates as "farsighted, mindful, smart or intelligent”.

== Clan tree ==
In the Northeast regions of Somalia, the World Bank shows the following clan tree:

- Darod
  - Mohamed Darod (Kablalah)
  - Isse Darod
  - Yusuf Darod (Awrtable)
  - Ahmed Darod (Sade)
  - Hussein Darod (Tanade)
    - Mohamed Hussein (Awmaki)
      - Masadan Mohamed
        - Dirir Masadan
          - Hoobaanle Dirir
            - Adnaan Hoobanle
              - Dirir Adnaan
                - Harun Dirir
                  - Diftire Harun
                    - Shu`ayb Diftire (Leelkase)

Below is list of the Major Leelkase Subclans and cities / towns they reside:

- The "Mansor, Aamin and Hamud" in BenadirHamar weyne
- The "Mansor, Aamin and Hamud" in BayBuurhakaba
- The "Cali Sheikh" in Middle Shabeele
- The "Aw-Salaat" in Lower Shabeele
- The Jaamac Hassan Muumin in Buurhakaba (Mostly in their own town called "Hassan Muumin")
- The [[Muumin Adan]] largely in Mudug(Goldogob, Gaalkacyo), & Lower Jubba (Kismaayo), Dudub
- The "Rooble Hassan" in Garowe, Eyl, Boosaaso and Qardho
- The "Mohamed Hassan" Ree Xabbad in Dan-goronyo, Eyl, Taleex and lower Jubba
- The "Mahamed Adan" who lives in Garoowe and Eyl.
- The "Fiqi Ismail" in Gaalkacyo and Burtinle
- The "Maalismogge" of Eyl Nugaal and Gaalkacyo
- The "Ismail Ali" in "Qandala"
- The "Suhurre" in Eyl Nugaal

The Musa Ali further divides into the prominent Mumin Aden clans of the Mudug Region and the Somali Region of Ethiopia, and Hassan Idiris Clan of the Nugaal, Sool and Bari regions and as well as the Fiqi Ismail of Mudug region.

The Mahamud Ali clans settle in the Bari region of North Eastern Somalia; particularly in Bandar Beyla district. Hashim Ali is divided into the Malismoge clans and settle in the Mudug region. Gambayah (Somali: Gambayax, Arabicجمبيح) is a District in the Nugal region of Puntland state of Somalia. It lies approximately 50 km Northeast of the city of Garoowe. The town is populated by the Rooble Hassan subclan of Leelkase, and other Idiris Osman clans. The city has a population of approximately 800,060.

Nugaal-gibin (Somali: Nugaal gibin, Arabic: نوغال غبن) is a District in the Mudug region of Puntland state of Somalia. It lies approximately 40 km southeast of the city of Galdogob. The town is populated by the Xirsi Muumin subclan of Leelkase, and other Mumin Adan clans. The city has a population of approximately 600,000.

== Population ==
As of 2005, the broader Galdogob District had a total population of 40,433 residents mostly Leelkase 33,366 of inhabitants were urban and 57,067 were non-urban. Bayla has a population of around 16,700 inhabitants. The broader Bayla District has a total population of 14,376 residents. Bayla is primarily inhabited by people from the Somali ethnic group, with the Majeerteen and Leelkase Darod well-represented. The broader Garowe District has an estimated total population of 190,000 residents. As with most of Puntland, it is primarily inhabited by Somalis from the Harti Darod clan confederation, in particular the Majerteen and leelkase Darood clans. The Leelkase are also dominant in Garsoor, largest neighborhood of Galkayo with an estimated population of 137,667 inhabitants.

== History ==
Somalia is inhabited by five major ethnic clans and one minor ethnic clan. The five major clans are the Darod, Dir, Hawiye, Isaaq, Rahanweyn and the minor clan called is the Ashraaf. The major clans within Darod are Ogaden, Dhulbahante, Jidwaq, Leelkase, Majeerteen, Marehan, Warsangali, Awrtable, Dishiishe, and Mora'ase. Darod is the largest clan because they operate in almost all parts of the north. Within the Dir clan is the Issa, Gadabuursi, Surre, and Biimaal. These clans make up the area known as “Greater Somalia” (Kenya, Ethiopia, Djibouti, Somalia). Leelkase is a sub-clan of the Tanade, one of the oldest Darod clans, and one of the oldest kingdoms in Somalia, according to Arab and world history, reached in 1775, after heavy fighting and the collapse of the Tanade Darood.

The Leelkase sub-clan resides in Galdogob, Galkayo, Bander Beyla, Eyl, Garowe, and the Lower Juba, Bay, and Western Somali regions. The Leelkase community is described as a religious community, good neighbor, peace loving, and always caring for its neighbors. The Leelkase clan have received the nickname;"Darbi Darod"("The wall of Darod"), which tells about the defence, from the Hawiye clan, in the Hawiye-Darood war. It is a large clan scattered throughout all regions of Somalia such as Mudug, Nugal, Bari, Sool, Lower Juba, Middle Juba, Bay and Western Somalia. It is mainly inhabited by the Karkar community: Caris, Ceel, Dhidir, Buurbuur iyo Arindheer.

The Leelkase are mostly found in the Mudugh region in south-central Somalia. Although the Leelkase and the Majerteen are both from the Darod clan, "relations between them have not been great for a long time and they have fought each other a couple of times." Warm relations have been rare between the two groups. There are Leelkase in the Bari and Nugal regions. Relations between the two groups in that region may not be cordial. The Leelkase have been "fighting constantly with the Marehan in Gedo region. With regard to Leelkase relations with the Ogaden, there have been Leelkase "elements" in the Ogaden since the outbreak of the conflicts in Mogadishu. Having previously been in alliances against the Ogaden, the Leelkase relationship with the Ogadeni can be described as "tenuous at best".

== Dynasty Figures ==
- King Mahamed "Aw Maki" 1st Darod King.
- King Masadan 2nd Darod King.
- King Dirir 3rd Darod King.
- King Hobanle 4th Darod King.
- King Adnan 5th Darod King.
- King Dirir II 6th Darod King.
- King Harun 7th Darod King.
- King Diftire 8th Darod King.
- Ugas Mohamed Ugas Ali 32th Ugas/King of Tanade Dynasty.
- Ugas Ahmed Ugas Mohamed 33st Ugas/King of Tanade Dynasty.

== Notable figures ==
- Abdirahman Hosh Jibril A.U.N Former minister of constitutional affairs.
- Khadra Bashir Ali Former Minister of Education of Federal Government of Somalia
- Duraan Ahmed Farah Former minister of labor, also former minister of transportation and civil aviation during President farmaajo.
- Ali Abdi Giir A Somali author.
- Abdulkadir Abdi Hashi Former State for Planning and International Cooperation of Puntland, Former Minister of Education of Federal Government of Somalia
- Said Sheikh Samatar Prominent Somali scholar and writer.
- Sofia Samatar Somali-American educator, poet and writer. She is an assistant professor of English at James Madison University.
- A.U.N Shiikh Ahmed Haaji Abdirahman
- Shiikh Ahmed Abdisamad co-founder of Al-Ictisaam.
- Hassan Mohamed Faarah - Ayahle Former mayor of Goldogob Mudug Somalia.
- Sadik Warfa Former Member of Somali Federal Parliament, Former Minister of Labour & Social Affairs of Federal Government of Somalia
- Zakaria Mohamed Haji-Abdi Former Member of Somali Federal Parliamentarians .
- Abdikarim Sheikh Hassan Member of National Civil Service Commission, Former Member of Somali Parliament.
- Abdirishiid Khalif Hashi analyst, former director of heritage institute, and former minister during farmajo tenure.
- Ahmed Abdi Hashi (Taajir) Current MP of Federal Government of Somalia. Former Deputy Police Chief of Somalia.
- Ali ismacil Abdi giir Politician.
- Farduus Osmaan Egaal Minister of Transport & Civil Aviation (MoTCA) of the Federal Government of Somalia.
- Naasir Ayaxle - Naasir Dheere Artist and comedian.
- Abdihakim (Saacid) Dahir Said Former Police Chief of Federal Government of Somalia.
- Abdihakiin BR Comedian and TV Presenter.
- Abdullahi Mohamed Jigato Politician and current Member of Parliament
