= Rigomane =

Rigomane ሪጎማን
- Town
- Nickname: Cadan Yar
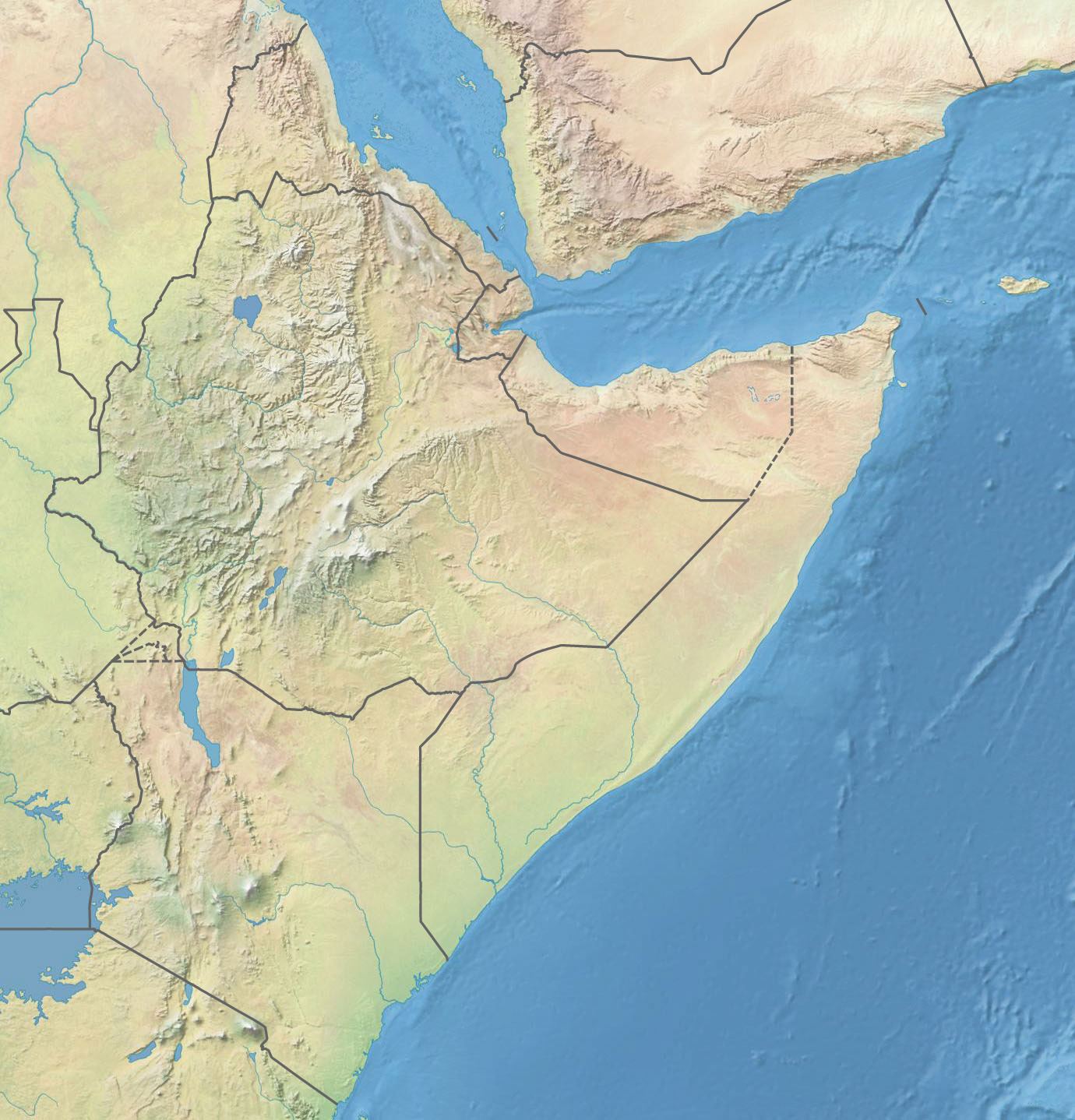
- Location within Somalia Location within the Horn of Africa Location within Africa
- Coordinates: 7°12′19″N 47°11′37″E
- Country: Somalia
- Regional State: Puntland
- Region: Mudug
- District: Galdogob
- Time zone: UTC+3 (EAT)

Rigomane is a town in the north-central Mudug region of Somalia. It is situated between Galdogob and Galkayo, the provincial capital.
