= Harfo =

- Town
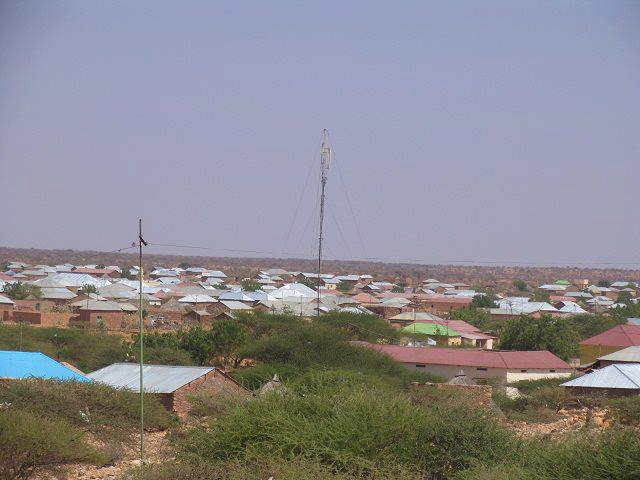
- View of Harfo

- Location in Somalia Harfo (Somalia)
- Coordinates: 7.350°N 47.622°E
- Country: Somalia
- Regional state: Puntland
- Region: Mudug

Population
  - Total: 27 850
- Time zone: UTC+3 (EAT)

Harfo (Somali: Xarfo or Xarfa Agga Bar) is a town in the north-central Mudug region of Somalia.

The town of Harfo is located nearby and has now become united into one city.

The Puntland Abqale Army Training Camp is located close to Harfo.

Today, the town of Harfo/Harfa is a mid-sized town with a population over 20,000. The town has recently become the headquarters of Puntland's customs authority. Today Harfo/Harfa is the 9th largest town in Puntland.

== History ==
Relation map.

The village of Harfo/Harfa was founded in 1900. The village served as a military garrison of the Sultanate of Obbia under Sultan Ali Yussuf. The village expanded, was nominated for township in the 1980s, and became a member district and township of Mudug region in 1990s.

In June 1993, in order to end the fighting in Galkayo, it was decided to relocate the militias that were in conflict in the city to Wargalo, Buryaqab (Harfo) and Galdogob, which are 70 kilometers away.

Harfa has witnessed further growth and development since the establishment of Puntland in 1998, mostly fueled by investment by the Somali diaspora in Europe and the Americas.

In October 2010, it was reported that Ethiopian soldiers had detained five residents of Harfo.

In March 2013, a meeting was held at Harfo to discuss ways of resolving the clan conflicts, piracy, and drug problems occurring in Mudug.

In March 2014, the Puntland security forces arrested Harfo Governor Abdulahi Farah Beyle (Tikroni) on suspicion of embezzlement. This is seen as part of the Puntland President's anti-corruption measures.

In May 2015, Shiikh Cabdiqni Qoorane Maxamed, who was appointed Suldaan of Beesha Maxamed Cumar, a branch of Omar Mohamoud clan, visited Harfo. He was crowned on October 28th.

In November 2016, a fight broke out in Harfo due to a water shortage, and one person died.

In May 2017, a section of the Puntland military rebelled and occupied Harfo.

In June 2017, an outbreak of water-borne diarrhea occurred in the Harfo area, killing 10 people.

In January 2018, a tree-planting campaign was held at Harfo.

In May 2019, President Puntland visited Harfo to discuss the planned construction of an army training camp in nearby Abqale.

In March 2021, a section of the Puntland military blocked the roads around Harfo on the grounds that they had not been paid.

In April 2021, the Puntland forces conducted training at the Abqale camp in Harfo.

In June 2021, the Puntland Water Development Agency repaired the Harfo well.

In October 2021, Harfo accepted people who had been expelled from Las Anod by the Somaliland government. The mayor of the Harfo district calls for support for those expelled from Las Anod.

In September 2022, militiamen blockaded the road in Harfo.

In January 2023, President Puntland visits Harfo to celebrate the opening of the road to Burtinle.

In August 2023, the Puntland security forces of Harfo set up a toll booth on a road and began collecting tolls, citing unpaid salaries.

In August 2024, the Harfo parliament dismissed the mayor and elected Abdirahman Hirsi Farax as the new mayor.

On December 12th 2024, a well in the Harfo area was destroyed and buried by an armed group, and this led to a two-day struggle between Reer Mahad and Mohamed Omar, two branches of the Majerteen clan, in which four people died. On the 24th, a reconciliation negotiation was held at the residence of Suldan Mahamed Suldan Mahamud, mediated by the Minister of the Interior of Puntland, and the conflict ended.

== Administration ==
Harfo is situated in the north-central part of Somalia, and is one of the most developed towns in the region. The city is divided into four main administrative districts called Jabuuti, Ubax, Hilaac and Wadajir.

== Education ==
Harfo has three primary schools and one secondary school. Primary schools are Horyaal primary school and Harfo peace and development school which are locates in Jabuuti village and Furqaan primary school which locates near Boorey market. Suldan Hurre secondary school is the only secondary school in Harfo which is named after Suldan Mohamuud Hurre who was Somali elder.

== Notable personalities of Harfa/Harfo origin ==
- Sultan Warsame Awdoon - First Nai’ib, Chief Commander, Leader and Sultanate State Affairs Minister for the service of His Majesty Sultan Ali Yuusuf (Sultanate of Obbia)
- Du'ale Farah - Lieutenant commander of Sultanate Forces of Obbia of His Majesty Sultan Ali (Sultanate of Obbia)
- Abdisalam Issa-Salwe - Scholar, Professor at Taibah University, and Thames Valley University, UK
- Abdullahi Ahmed Irro - Scholar, Graduate of the USSR Frunze Academy, Professor of Strategy and a General in Somali Army 1970s-1980s
- Hawa Aden Amey - Educator and social activist. Executive Director of the Galkayo Education Center for Peace and Development.
- Yaasin Nur Godane - Banker, Member of the Somali Administration 1941 -1959 and Governor of Hiran Region
- Ali Karaani - A senior leader of Somali Police Force, and the former head of Police Institute of Somalia known as Scuola di polizia
- Abdullahi Farah Holif - A Graduate of Princeton University, USA. and former head of the Financial Guards of Somalia known as Guardia di Finanza
- Mohamed Isse Salwe - Director General of Somalia's Tourism Industry
- Abdirisaq Yussuf Elmi - Scholar, Graduate of USSR Leningrad Engineering & Railway University, Engineer and former minister in Autonomous Puntland State.
