= Roox =

Village in Mudug, Somalia

- Village
- Location in Somalia
- Coordinates: 7°12′18″N 47°26′05″E
- Country: Somalia
- Regional State: Puntland
- Region: Mudug
- District: Galdogob
- Time zone: UTC+3 (EAT)

Roox is a village in the north-central Mudug region of Somalia. Situated in the Galdogob District just to the west-northwest of Bacadweyn, it is located about 40 km northeast of the city of Galdogob. The area is mainly occupied in small-scale farming.
