= Nugal =

Nugal may refer to:

- Nugal Beach, an all nude beach on the Makarska Riviera in Croatia
- Nugal region, a region in Puntland state of Somalia
- Nugal Hall, Historic site in New South Wales, Australia
- Nugaal Valley, Valley in Somalia
- Nugaal, River and Wadi in Somalia
- Nugaal-gibin, town in Puntland
- Nugaal University, university in Las Anod, Somalia
