= Balanbale =

Balanbale or Balanballe may refer to:

- Balanbale, Togdheer, a town in the Togdheer region of Somaliland
- Balanbale district, in Galguduud region of Somalia
