= Halabokhad =

- Town
- Location within Somalia
- Coordinates: 6°50′57″N 47°24′51″E
- Country: Somalia
- Region: Mudug
- Time zone: UTC+3 (EAT)

Halabokhad (Somali: Halabookhad) is a small town in the north-central Mudug region of Somalia.

== Overview ==
Halabokhad is situated near Galkacyo, the capital of the Mudug region.

The town is primarily inhabited by people from the Somali ethnic group, with the Maalismoge sub-clan of the Leelkase especially well represented.
