= Beyra =

- Town
- Location in Somalia.
- Coordinates: 6°57′15″N 47°19′06″E
- Country: Somalia
- Regional State: Puntland
- Region: Mudug
- District: Galdogob
- Time zone: UTC+3 (EAT)

Beyra is a small town in the north-central Mudug region of Somalia. It is situated between Galdogob and Galkayo, in the autonomous Puntland region. It has schools and electricity.
