= Awrtable =

Somali sub-clan of Darod

أورتبلي

Regions with significant populations
- Somalia (Puntland, Jubaland, Galmudug, Banadir) Ethiopia (Somali Region)

Languages
- Somali, Arabic

Religion
- Islam

Related ethnic groups
- Majeerteen, Leelkase, Marehan, Ogaadeen, Dhulbahante, Dishiishe, Warsangeli and other Darod groups.

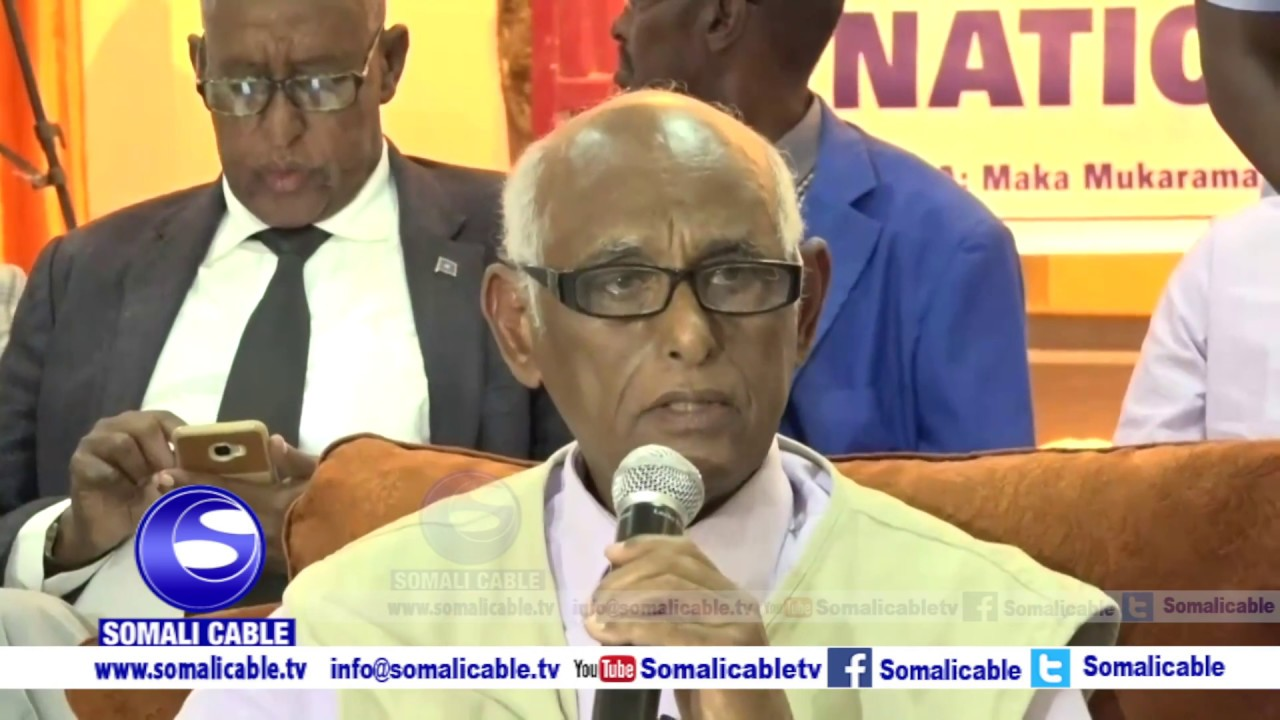
Former Prime Minister of Somalia, Mohamed Abdi Yusuf hails from the Muse Ibraahim sub-clan of the Awrtable

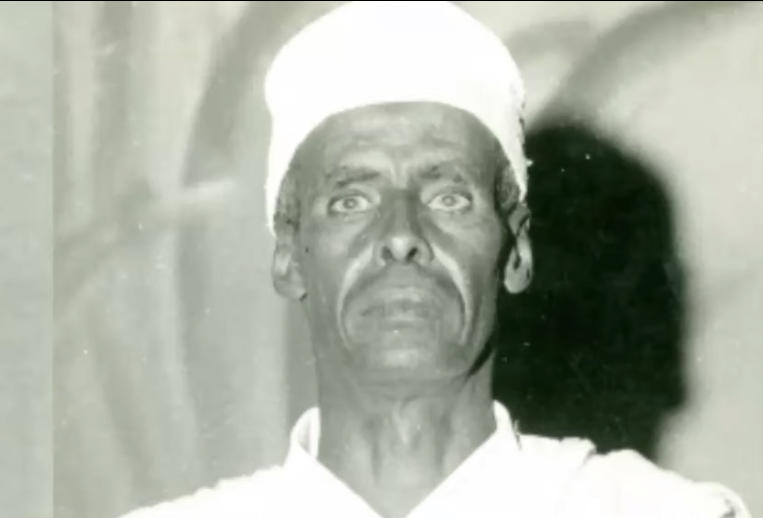
Caryes Ciise Kaarshe, a Famous Somali Poet known most notably for the poems "Hooyo waa lama huran" and "Wan iyo Waraabe" also hails from the Muse Ibraahim sub-clan of the Awrtable Burtinle city in Nugaal region is their stronghold where they make up the majority.

The Awrtable (Somali: Awrtable, Arabic: أورتبلي; also spelled Ortable, Aurtable or Owrtable) is a Prominent Somali sub-clan from the Darod clan.

== Background ==
The Awrtable have a vast traditional territory covering Mudug, Nugaal, and some areas of Bari. They primarily inhabit the Puntland state of Somalia also be found in the Somali Region and the Jubaland state. They live in or have significant population centers in almost every Somali state or gobol. The Awrtable are situated mainly around the cities of Burtinle, Galkacyo, Gacmofale, Garowe, Meeraysane, Balibusle, Eyl, Godobjiraan, Godod, Rabaable, Bacadweyne, Jamaame, Afdheer, Bosaaso (Bender Qaasim) and Shilaabo.

The largest Sub-clan of the Awrtable are the Musa Ibrahim.

In the pre-Kacaan era, Awrtable made up a majority of Darod residents in the capital of Somalia, Mogadishu.

== Etymology ==
The name Awrtable is an example of a portmanteau, coming from the root word Awr meaning "a large male packing camel" and the world Table meaning "he who ties a knot". The name comes from the origin story of the Darood clan; Abdirahman bin Isma'il Al-Jabarti, the patrilineal father of all Darood families, was given Dir's daughter girl by the name of Donbiro/Dombira. The dowry price given was that one of the sons from that union would be given to the Dir and be raised as one of them. The dowry was delayed until the fifth and youngest son, Yusuf, was born. He was raised amongst his mother's side of the family. One day, he overheard his uncles planning to murder his father and his brothers. He then decided to tie the camels of his mother's people, then receiving the name Awrtable—or he who slyly tied the camels. For that reason, his father Abdirahman made a supplication and what can be seen as a prediction that the descendants of Yusuf would be small in number but excel in learning and rank.

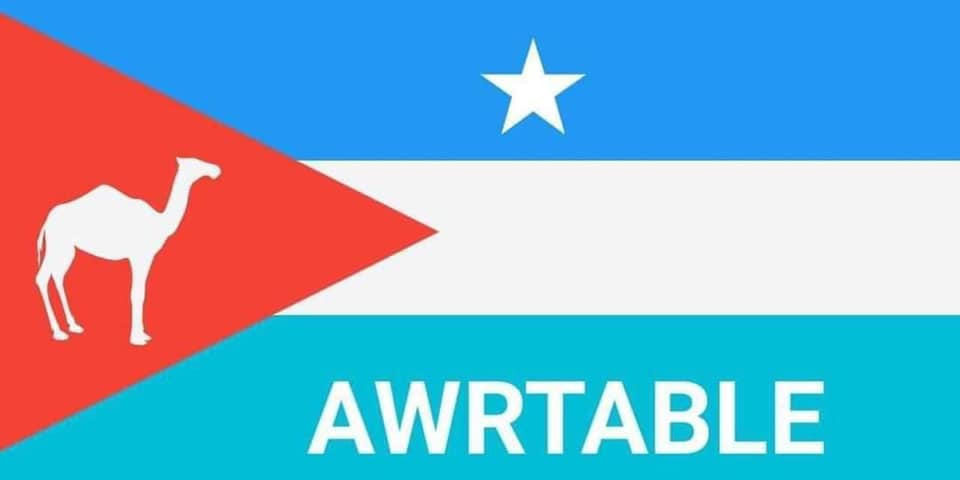
The proposed clan flag that has gained popularity amongst Awrtable individuals on social media, more specifically TikTok and Facebook

== Clan tree ==
The clan tree is based on Généalogie du peuple Somali and a study by the African Studies Centre. The clan tree is shown below.

- Darod
  - Awrtable (Yusuf Darod)
    - Muse Ibraahim
      - Fiqi Idiris
    - Maxamed Ibraahim
    - Geedi Ibraahim
    - Jamac Ibraahim
    - Guled Ibraahim
    - Ahmed Ibraahim
    - Farah Ibraahim

There is a tradition that suggests that the Dabare clan of the Rahanweyn are originally descended from the Awrtable, being the brother of Islaam'uroone, the father of Ibraahim, the progenitor of the main Ibrahim subclans

== Notable people ==
- Haji Diriye Hirsi was the founding member of the Somali Youth League.
- Mohamed Abdi Yusuf was the former Prime Minister of Somalia.
- Ugaas Omar Geele Mohamed is the current Ughaz of Awrtable
- Careys Ciise Kaarshe was a famous Somali poet.
- Abdiqani Gelle Mohamed, is the State minister of fisheries and Senator in the Upper House of the Somali Parliament.
- Abdirahman Omar Mohamed (Dr. Cunaaye) was the Former Director of Benaadir Regional Medical, Public Health, and Epidemiology Services
- Abdi Yusuf was the first Somali killed during the Dhagaxtur uprising against Italian colonization in 1943, and father of Mohamed Abdi Yusuf
- Fuad Qalaf, a Somali-Swedish Islamist militant.
- Jabir Mohamed Abdi is the current State Minister of Education of the Federal Government of Somalia
- Abdiasis Nur Hersi is the former Minister of Labor and Sports from 1970 to 1977
- Mohamed Mohamud Gani is a professor of veterinary and former head of the Somali National University.
- Dr Mohamed Aden Dhagaweyne was an author of the "Garowe Constitution of Puntland", and a representative of Mudug region.
- Dr. Abdirahman Sheikh-Nur, J.D., Ph.D. He is the one who wrote the Somali constitution during the former central government of Somalia.
- Abdirahman Nur Hersi is the former Minister of Finance in Somalia and founding member and executive Vice President of the Islamic Development Bank
- Sheikh-Nuur Muxammad the spiritual leader with many miracle appeared during his lifetime, blessings, and healing. He is well known in Somalia
- General Mohamed Hussien Daa'ud "Xiirane" was a High Commanding General in the Ogaden War
- Mohamed Abdullahi Warsame is a jurist who is serving as judge of the Supreme Court of Kenya.
