= Abdi Bashir Indhobuur =

Somali poet

Abdi Bashiir Indhobuur was a Somali poet and songwriter. He wrote a song called Arligeygow, translated to mean My Land. He also wrote the famous song "Isku Duubni baa", translated to "By Unity".

Indhobuur was born in Gaalkacyo in the Mudug region of Somalia.

== Career ==
In 1963, he joined the police force, permanently moving to the capital, Mogadishu, in 1972. Shortly afterwards, he joined Heegan, a troupe associated with the Somali National Theatre.
