= Somali Faces =

Non-profit organization

- Website type: Photoblog
- Owners: Mohammed Ibrahim Shire and Donia Jamal Adam
- Website: www.somalifaces.org web.archive.org/web/20180208233516/http://www.somalifaces.org/
- Commercial: No
- Launched: January 1, 2016; 10 years ago
- Current status: Unavailable

Somali Faces is a cultural project launched in 2016 aimed at sharing stories about Somalis from different parts of the world, while combating the negative media narratives about the people and the country. Founded by Mohammed Ibrahim Shire and Donia Jamal Adam, the project has published stories about Somalis from 20 countries and has over 100,000 followers on Facebook. As of 2025, the current status of the organization is unknown.

== Blog ==
=== Somali diaspora ===
Somali Faces is a storytelling organization founded by Mohammed Ibrahim Shire and Donia Jamal Adam in January 2016. The initiative began by featuring personal stories of Somalis living in the diaspora, with the aim of challenging stereotypes and promoting a more nuanced understanding of Somali identity. It later began to include narratives from individuals residing in Somalia and Somaliland. Stories are published in Somali and English on the organization’s platforms. The initiative has received international recognition for its role in promoting a more nuanced understanding of Somali identity and experiences.

== Humanitarianism ==
In January 2017, two Somali girls in Galdogob, Puntland, Somalia, fell victims to a gang rape case and subsequently the video footage was released. Somali Faces took the initiative and raised over £4,475 (US$5,516) to support the girls and their families.

== Awards ==
- 2018: International Somali Award, Innovative category, 2018 International Somali Awards for Somali Faces.
