= El Dibir District =

El Dibir
- District
- Country: Somalia
- Region: Mudug
- Capital: El Dibir
- Time zone: UTC+3 (EAT)

El Dibir District (Somali: Degmada El Dibir) is a district in the north-central Mudug region of Somalia. Its capital lies at El Dibir.
