= Saaxo =

Town in Mudug region, Somalia

Town of Saaxo
- Town
- Flag

- Location within Somalia
- Country: Somalia
- State: Puntland
- Region: Mudug
- Time zone: UTC+3 (EAT)

Town of Saaxo (Somali: Tuulo Saaxo) is a town in the Mudug region of Somalia, located within the autonomous state of Puntland. The town lies inland and plays an important role in the region's trade, agriculture and local culture.
