= El Dinouda Digdighei =

Village in Mudug, Somalia

- Village
- Location in Somalia.
- Coordinates: 7°20′19″N 49°35′54″E
- Country: Somalia: Puntland
- Region: Mudug
- Time zone: UTC+3 (EAT)

El Dinouda Digdighei is a coastal village in the north-central Mudug region of Somalia.
