= Harardhere =

Harardhere هرارديري Xarardheere Haradere
- Town
- Somalia Flag
- Interactive map of Harardhere
- Coordinates: 4°39′16″N 47°51′27″E
- Country: Somalia
- province: Galmudug
- District: Harardhere

Government
  - Control: Somalia

Population
  - Total: 65,523
- Time zone: UTC+3 (EAT)
- Area code: +252

Harardhere (Arabic: هرارديري, Somali: Xarardheere) is a historic town in the Mudug province of Somalia. It is situated in the autonomous Galmudug state and serves as the capital of the Harardhere District.

== History ==
The town was controlled by the al-Qaeda-linked terrorist group al-Shabaab from at least 2012 to 2023. In 2018, a US airstrike killed 60 al-Shabaab fighters at a training camp in a rural area outside the town. On 16 January 2023, the town was recaptured by the Somali Armed Forces.

== Demographics ==
As of 2005, Harardhere had a population of around 65,543 inhabitants. As with most of Galmudug, it is primarily inhabited by Somalis from the Hiraab sub-clan of the Hawiye.

== Notable residents ==
- Abdirashid Ali Shermarke, second president of Somalia
- Daud Abdulle Hirsi, first Somali Armed Forces commander
- Mohamed Abshir Muse, first Somali Police Force commander
- Salaad Gabeyre Kediye, former Somali senior military commander
- Ahmed Mohamed Jimale, former Chief of staff of Somalia National Army
- Mahad Karate, deputy emir and leader of Al-Shabaab Aminayat
