= Dalsan-Mudug =

Dalsan-mudug
- Town
- Location in Somalia.
- Coordinates: 7°1′50″N 47°1′10″E
- Country: Somalia
- State: Puntland
- Region: Mudug
- Elevation: 735 m (2,411 ft)

Population
  - Total: 10,600
- Time zone: UTC+3 (EAT)

Dalsan-Mudug (Somali: Dalsan-mudug, Arabic: دلسن-مدك) is a district in the Mudug Region of Puntland State of Somalia. It lies approximately 10 km southwest of the city of Galdogob. The town is populated by the Reer Mohamed hassan subclan of Leelkase. The city has a population of approximately 10,600, mainly pastoralists living in the rural areas of the town. Dalsan-mudug has a primary school, two farms, and water wells.
