= El Dibir =

Town in Mudug, Somalia

El Dibir Ceel Dibir عيل ديبير
- Town
- Location in Somalia.
- Coordinates: 5°53′01.7″N 48°20′42.1″E
- Country: Somalia: Galmudug
- Region: Mudug
- District: El Dibir

Government
  - Type: District Council
  - Mayor: Mohamud Mire sheikh

Population (2020)
  - Total: 200,000
- Time zone: UTC+3 (EAT)

El Dibir (Somali: Ceel Dibir) is a town in the central Mudug region of Somalia.
