= Hingod =

Town in Mudug, Somalia

- Town
- Location in Somalia.
- Coordinates: 6.416667°N 48.6°E
- Country: Somalia: Galmudug
- Region: Mudug
- Time zone: UTC+3 (EAT)

Hingod (Somali: Xingood) is a town in the north-central Mudug region of Somalia.
