= Galkayo University =

University in Somalia

Coordinates: 6.752630°N 47.42356°E

Galkayo University (GU) was established October 2010 in Galkayo, the capital city of the Mudug region of Somalia, with the objective to contribute and develop the educational provisions of higher education necessary to the inhabitants of Galmudug regions, its surrounding provinces and ultimately all over Somalia.

Galkayo University is administered by Mudug Foundation for Education Development (MUFED) which is set up by 55 Somali professionals in Somalia and outside Somalia (doctors, engineers, lecturers, teachers, lawyers, computer scientists, business people and other respected individuals) founded Galkayo University.
