= Galbarwaaqo =

Town in Mudug, Somalia

Coordinates: 6°07′41″N 47°40′44″E

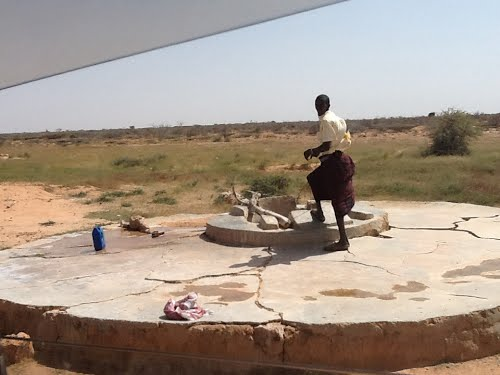
An estimated of 5000 local community population uses Warwar Tuulax as water source

Gal-barwaaqo is a district town located in central Mudug, Somalia.

Gal-barwaaqo is located about 80 Km from Gaalkacayo, Galmudug State. Its population is about 2,000. Galbarwaaqo lies near a large valley area known as Colguula Town near 35 Km.
