= Mohamed Abshir Muse =

First Somali Police Officer

- محمد أبشير موسى
- Born: 1 July 1926 Harardhere
- Died: 25 October 2017 (aged 91); Minneapolis, Minnesota, U.S.
- Military career
- Allegiance: Somalia
- Branch: Somali Police Force
- Service years: 1940s–1960s
- Rank: Major General
- Commands: Somali Police Force

Mohamed Abshir Muse (Somali: Maxamed Abshir Muuse, Arabic: محمد أبشير موسى); 1 July 1926 – 25 October 2017), also known as Mahamed Abshir Haamaan, was a prominent Somali General and the first Commander of the Somali Police Force.

== Early years ==
Abshir Muse was born to a Somali family and received training from the Carabinieri, Italy's national gendarmerie.

== Military and police career ==
Muse worked his way up to become a commandant in the Somali Defence forces from 1958 to 1960 and then opted to join the Somali Police Force upon its inception and commanded the force for 9 years till the military coup of 1969.

General Muse resigned in 1969 ahead of elections as he opposed the electoral process. He was later jailed by the military dictator Siad Barre for speaking out against the regime. He later on became the leader of the SSDF's political wing while Abdullahi Yusuf Ahmed led the armed wing from 1991 to 1998. There was a leadership struggle between the two parties, with Abdullahi Yusuf garnering the support of former military officials and Mohamed Abshir Muse the support from politicians associated with the civilian government of the 1960s. He died on 25 October 2017, aged 91. The collective punishment meted out by his officer Koosafaaro resulted in the first ever armed resistance in Somalia called Koofiya Dhuub.

== See also ==
- Salaad Gabeyre Kediye
- Mohamed Osman Irro
- Abdullahi Yusuf Ahmed
