= Nugaal-Gibin =

Town in Mudug region of Puntland

Nugaal-gibin
- Town
- Location in Somalia.
- Coordinates: 6°40′39.72″N 47°16′17.76″E
- Country: Somalia
- State: Puntland
- Region: Mudug
- Elevation: 735 m (2,411 ft)
- Time zone: UTC+3 (EAT)

Nugaal-Gibin (Somali: Nugaal Gibin, Arabic: نوغال غبن) is a town in the Mudug region of Puntland state of Somalia. It lies approximately 40 km southeast of the city of Galdogob. The town is populated by the Xirsi Muumin subclan of Leelkase, and other Mumin Adan clans. Nugaal-Gibin has a population of approximately 50,000 people, mainly pastorals living in the rural areas of the town. Nugaal-Gibin has a primary school, MCH health center, and water wells.
