= Bayla =

Bandar Beyla Bandar Beyla بندر بيلا
- Town
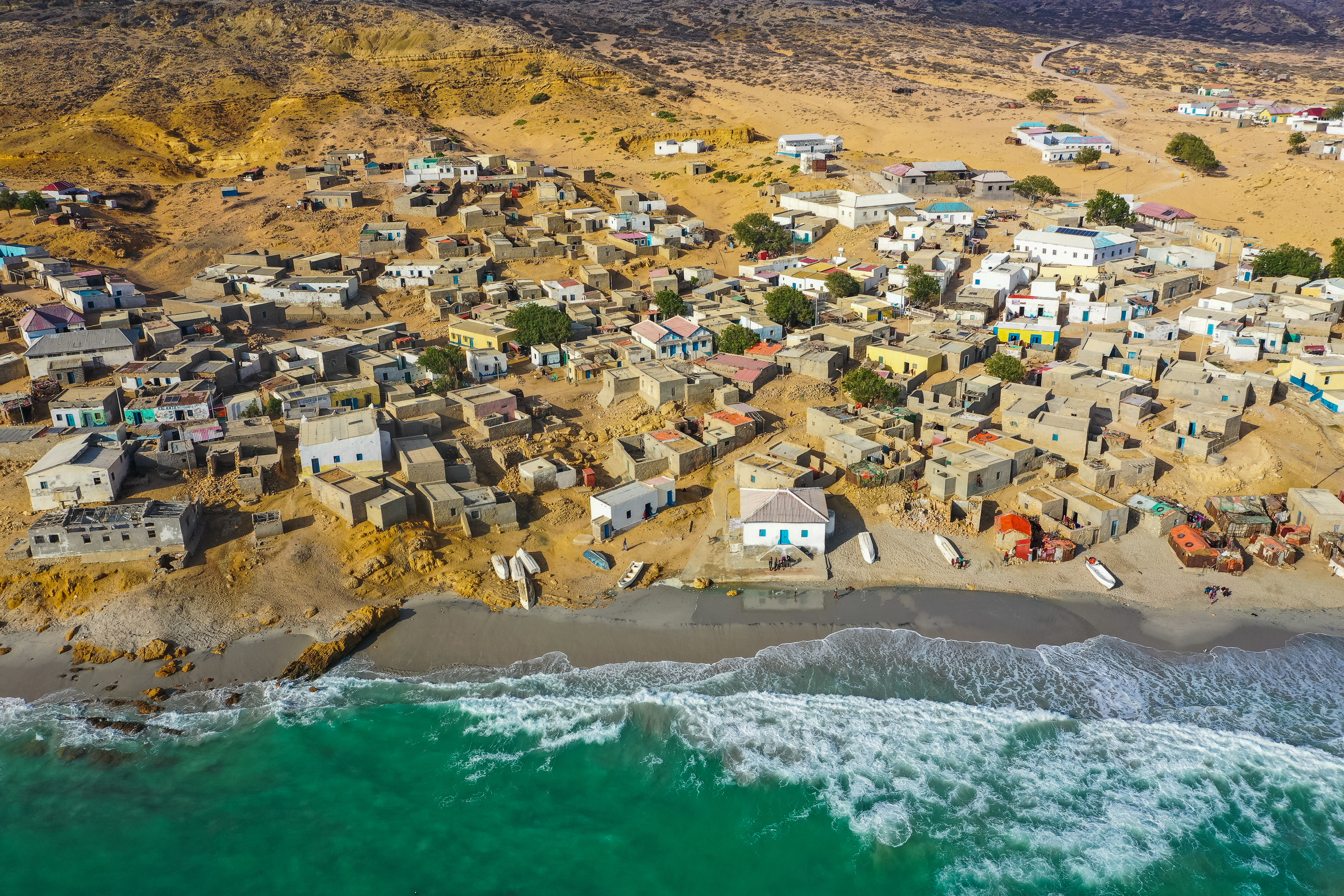

- Location in Somalia.
- Coordinates: 9°29′00″N 50°49′00″E
- Country: Somalia
- Regional State: Puntland
- Region: Bari
- District: Bayla

Population
  - Total: 16,700
- Time zone: UTC+3 (EAT)

Bayla (Somali: Bandar Beyla, Arabic: بندر بيلا), is a coastal town along the Guardafui Channel in the northeastern Bari region of Somalia. It is the capital of the Bayla District.

== History ==
Bandarbeyla has a long history as a strategic port along the Guardafui Channel.The town served as an important coastal centre within the historic Majeerteen Sultanate. Its prominent headland, Cape Ma'bar, functioned as a major navigation landmark on ancient maritime trading routes and early global charts.The port was traditionally famous as a primary center for building the sewn beden,a unique style of wooden vessel constructed using flexible coconut fibres instead of iron nails to safely navigate local coral reefs.

In the early 20th century, the area was incorporated into Italian Somaliland.

The town later sustained significant damage from the tsunami that followed the 2004 Indian earthquake.The community successfully rebuilt it's town center and coastal infrastructure through local initiatives and international diaspora investments.Today the port operates as a secure hub for regional artisanal fishing and maritime trade

== Economy ==
the economy of Bandarbeyla is primarily driven by fishing and livestock sectors, which together account for most of the local income.The town operates as a regional hub for artisanal fishing, where local fisherman utilise freezing facilities to store there catches for domestic markets and regional trade.Additionally the district's rural areas are heavily supported by nomadic pastoralism and small scale trade networks.

== Geography ==
Bandarbeyla is a coastal town on the eastern coast of the Somali peninsula, along the Guardafui channel. It is located near cape Ma'bar (Ras Ma'bar) a rocky headland extending into the western Indian Ocean.The town's location has made the surrounding area an important landmark for maritime navigation between the Somali coast, the Arabian peninsula and the Indian subcontinent.Historical maps and navigational records,including those associated with the 15th century voyages of the Ming dynasty admiral Zheng He, documents the use of the landmarks along this part of the Somali coast by sailors travelling across the Indian Ocean.

== Administration ==
Bandarbeyla operates as the administrative capital of the Bayla District within the Bari region of Puntland.Local public service and governance are managed by an elected municipal district council and a mayor working alongside traditional local leaders to handle community affairs.

== Demographics ==
Bayla has a population of around 16,700 inhabitants. The town is mainly inhabited by the Osman Mohamoud sub-clans of Majerteen; alongside the Mohamud Ali sub-clans of Leelkase.

The broader Bayla District has a total population of 14,376 residents.

== Education ==
The districts educational infrastructure features primary schools that serve both local urban residents and surrounding pastoralist families.Secondary education for local the youth is primarily provided by the Bandarbeyla secondary school
