= Hassan Ali Mire =

Somali politician (1930–2016)

Dr. Hassan Ali Mire حسن علي مير

Chairman of the Somali Salvation Democratic Front
- In office 1986–1991
- Preceded by: Abdullahi Yusuf Ahmed
- Succeeded by: Mohamed Abshir Waldo

Minister of Education of the Somali Democratic Republic
- In office 1969–1970
- Preceded by: Aden Isaq Ahmed
- Succeeded by: Abdirizak Mohamud Abubakar

Personal details
- Born: Afgoye, Italian Somaliland
- Died: 9 November 2016 (aged 85–86) Columbus, Ohio, US
- Party: Somali Salvation Democratic Front
- Education: Princeton University

Dr. Hassan Haji Ali Mire, better known as Hasaan ‘Ali Mirreh' (Somali: Xasan Cali Mirreh; Arabic: حسن علي مير), 1930 – 9 November 2016) was a Somali politician. During the early 1970s, he briefly served as the first Minister of Education of the Somali Democratic Republic. Mire later co-founded and chaired the Somali Salvation Democratic Front (SSDF). In 1998, he was also among the founders of the autonomous Puntland State of Somalia.

== Personal life ==
Mire was born and raised in Somalia. He hails from the Majerteen sub-clan of the Darod clan.

For his post-secondary education, Mire studied in the United States. He earned a Ph.D. from the private Ivy League institution Princeton University in New Jersey.

== Career ==
=== Minister of Education ===
On 15 October 1969, while paying a visit to the northern town of Las Anod, Somalia's then President Abdirashid Ali Shermarke was shot dead by one of his own bodyguards. His assassination was quickly followed by a military coup d'état on 21 October 1969, in which the Somali Army seized power without encountering armed opposition – essentially a bloodless takeover. The putsch was spearheaded by Major General Mohamed Siad Barre, who at the time commanded the army. The new Supreme Revolutionary Council (SRC) that seized power subsequently named Mire as the Minister of Education in its first post-coup Cabinet. He resigned after nine months of his appointment to the office.

=== Somali Salvation Democratic Front ===
In 1978, a group of officials mainly from Mire's own Majeerteen clan, including Abdullahi Yusuf Ahmed, participated in an abortive attempt to overthrow Barre's dictatorial administration. Most of the people who had helped plot the coup were summarily executed, but Ahmed and several other colonels managed to escape abroad. Later that year, in adjacent Ethiopia, Mire and Ahmed formed a rebel movement called the Somali Salvation Front, with Ahmed serving as Chairman. The organization was subsequently renamed the Somali Salvation Democratic Front (SSDF) in 1979. It was the first of several opposition groups dedicated to ousting Barre's regime by force.

In 1986, following Ahmed's imprisonment a few months earlier by the Ethiopian authorities, Mire was elected as the SSDF's new Chairman. Under his direction, the organization adhered to a moderate policy demanding free elections and the removal of foreign military bases.

In 1990, on the eve of the civil war in Somalia and the toppling of Barre's regime, Mire was among the signatories of a manifesto advocating national reconciliation. As a representative of the SSDF, Mire opposed any military rule. Other signatories of the document included Aden Abdullah Osman Daar, Somalia's first president, and around 100 additional Somali politicians.

== Puntland ==
In 1998, Mire, Abdullahi Yusuf Ahmed and other prominent figures from northeastern Somalia, including the region's political elite, traditional elders (Issims), members of the business community, intellectuals and civil society representatives, established the Government of Puntland. The constitutional conference in which the declaration was made was held in Garowe over a period of three months, with the aim of delivering services to the population, offering security, facilitating trade, and interacting with both domestic and international partners. Ahmed was subsequently elected as the state's first President.

== Later years and death ==
In August 2013, Mire was a guest speaker at the Fourth Annual Ohio Somali Graduation Program in Columbus, Ohio. The event brought together hundreds of students, parents, professionals and leaders to honor the state's Somali secondary and tertiary graduates. Former Prime Minister of Somalia Mohamed Abdullahi Mohamed (Farmajo) served as a keynote speaker, with financial scholarships awarded to the most outstanding pupils.

Mirreh died in Columbus, Ohio, US at age of 86.

== See also ==
- Abdullahi Yusuf Ahmed
