= Democratic Front for the Liberation of Somalia =

Somali insurgent group

The Democratic Front for the Liberation of Somalia was a Somali insurgent group, fighting against the government of Siad Barre. Ideologically DFLS was oriented towards Marxism and nationalism. DFLS was led by a group of former Central Committee members of the Somali Revolutionary Socialist Party (SRSP), who considered that Siad Barre had deviated from the revolutionary path. The movement was founded around 1978 by Abdirahman Aidid Ahmad, former chairman of the Ideological Bureau of SRSP. DFLS had its headquarters in Aden, South Yemen.

Reportedly, DFLS fighters obtained military training in Syria.

In 1981, DFLS merged with the Somali Salvation Front and the Somali Workers Party, forming the Somali Salvation Democratic Front.
