= Dajimale =

- Town
- Location in Somalia.
- Coordinates: 6°18′15″N 48°13′04″E
- Country: Somalia
- Region: Mudug
- Time zone: UTC+3 (EAT)

Dajimale (Somali: Dajimaale) is a town in the north-central Mudug region of Somalia.
