= Harardhere District =

Harardhere
- District
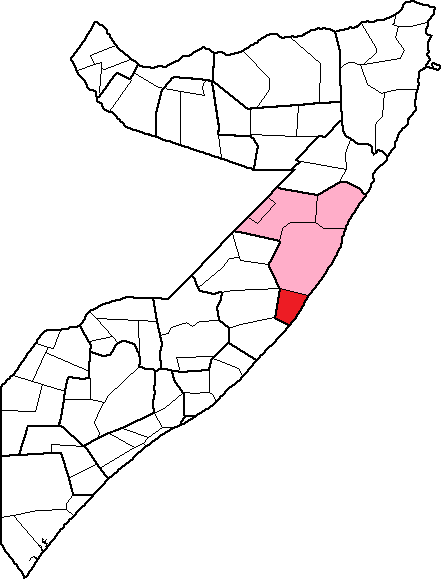
- Country: Somalia
- Region: Mudug
- Capital: Harardhere
- Regional State: Galmudug
- Time zone: UTC+3 (EAT)

Harardhere District (Somali: Degmada Xarardheere) is a district in the north-central Mudug region of Somalia. Its capital is Harardhere.

The district has been controlled by the Al Qa'ida-linked terrorist group al-Shabaab since at least 2012. In 2018, as US airstrike killed 80 al-Shabaab fighters at a training camp in a rural area outside the town. update in 2023 Somali National Army captured the Town from Al Shabaab in August 2023
