= Hilalaye =

- Location in Somalia.
- Coordinates: 6°06′17″N 49°00′09″E
- Country: Somalia
- Region: Mudug
- Elevation: 131 m (430 ft)
- Time zone: UTC+3 (EAT)

Hilalaye (Somali: Hiilalaaye) is a coastal well in the north-central Mudug region of Somalia.
