= Mohamed Abshir Waldo =

- Born: 1938; Somalia
- Died: March 5, 2016 (aged 77–78); Nairobi
- Education: Columbia University Journalism School
- Occupations: Political activist, journalist, philanthropy
- Spouse: faisa abdiqafaar
- Children: 5

Mohamed Abshir Waldo (Somali: Maxamed Abshir Waldo, Arabic: محمد أبشير والدو) was a prominent Somali journalist and political activist.

== Career ==
Growing up as a camel herder, he eventually ended up at Columbia University during the Columbia University protests of 1968. He is a graduate of Columbia University Journalism School (MA in Mass Media, 1968).

Waldo started out as a radio journalist with the BBC World Service and eventually became the Director of the Somali Broadcasting Service, the main government service in the 1960s.

In 1980s, he became Information Minister for the Somali Salvation Democratic Front and briefly served as the head of the organization.

His writings on the remittance industry stem from his development work on micro-finance issues as well as his interest in regional rehabilitation through small-business initiatives. Waldo has written extensively on the Somali remittance industry. He has also written articles about the root causes of piracy of the coast of Somalia.
