= Nugal Beach =

Nude beach in Croatia

Coordinates: 43°16′44″N 17°1′58″E

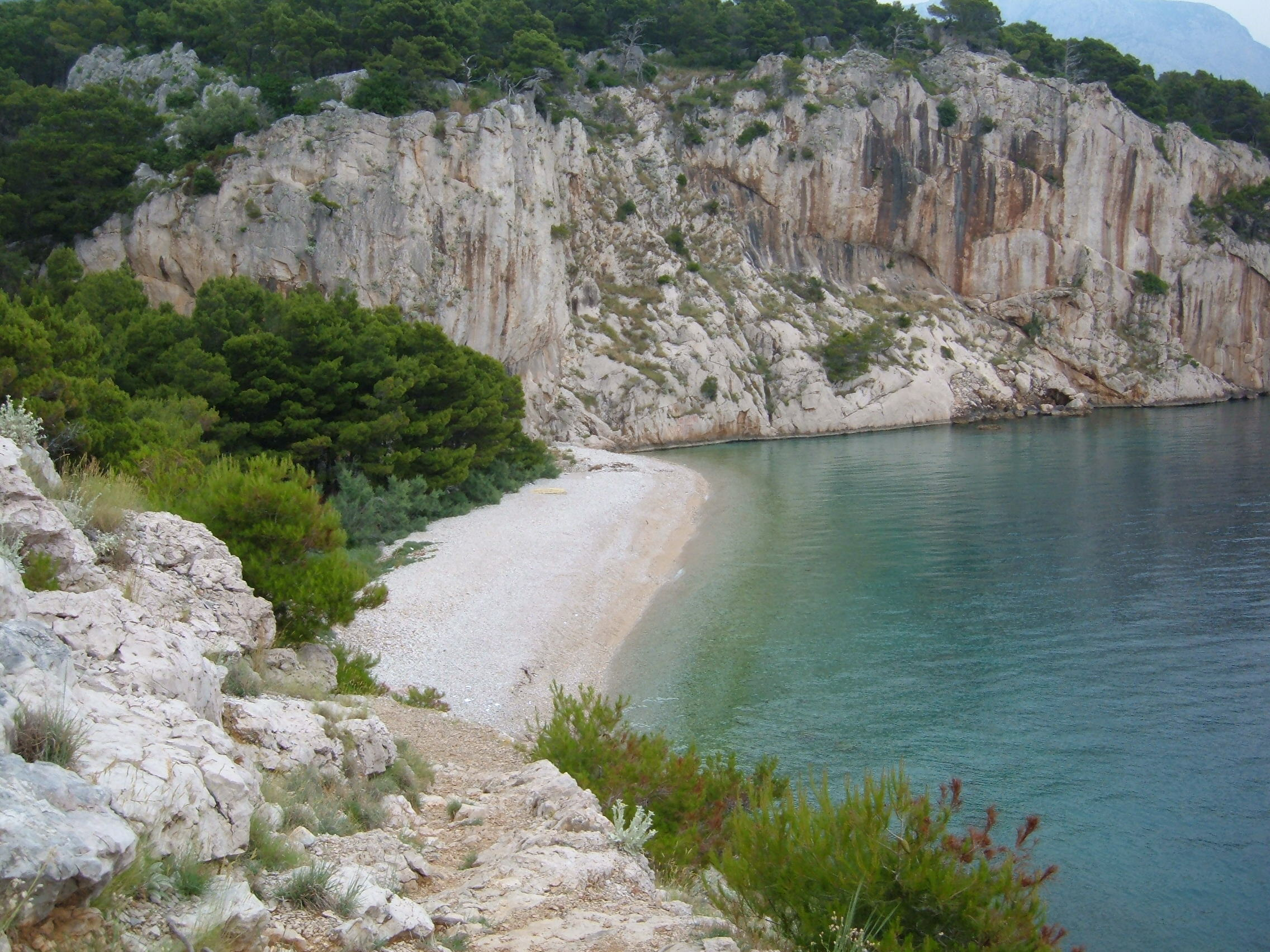
Nugal Beach

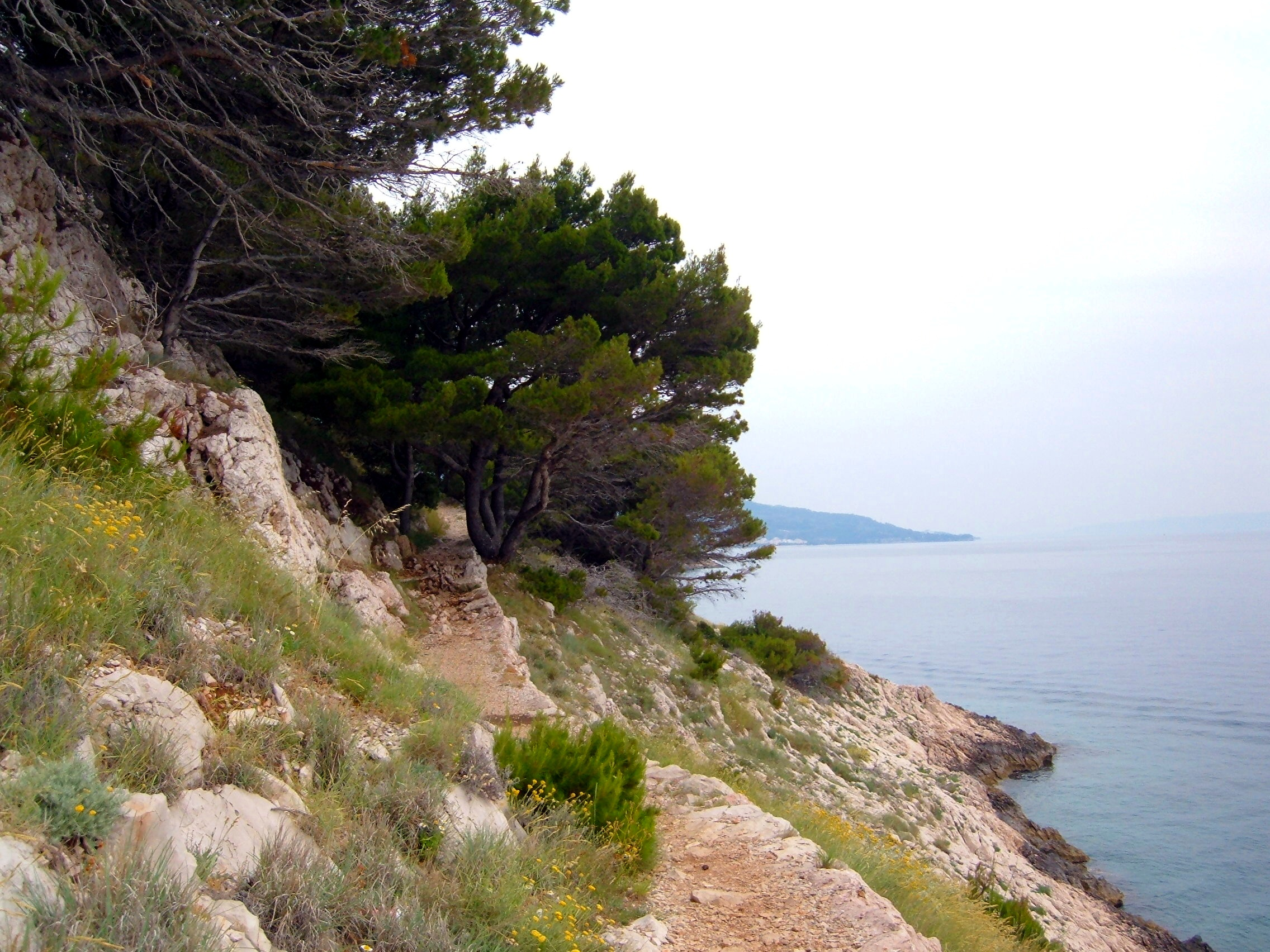
The path to Nugal Beach

Nugal Beach is an all nude beach on the Makarska riviera in Croatia, between the towns of Makarska and Tučepi. Situated in a pebbled bay surrounded by steep cliffs, the beach is only accessible by foot following a prepared but stony path along the coast from Makarska (a 30-minute walk) or from Tučepi.

The beach and its close surrounding suffered from fire, 1 August 2021.
