= Bacadweyn =

Town in Mudug, Somalia

Bacadweyn bacadweyn Ciid-wayne
- Location in Somalia.
- Coordinates: 7°11′30″N 47°31′33″E
- Country: Somalia Puntland
- Region: Mudug
- District: Galkayo
- Elevation: 372 m (1,220 ft)

Population
  - Total: 53,890
- Time zone: UTC+3 (EAT)

Bacadweyn is a town in the north-central Mudug region of Somalia. It is mainly occupied in small-scale farming. It is administered by Puntland State. Secondary schools in the area include Ba'ad Weyn Secondary.
