= Sadik Warfa =

Somali–American politician

Sadik Warfa is a Somali-American politician and was a member of the Somalia parliament and the former Minister for Labor and Social Affairs.

Warfa comes from the Leelkase Tanade, a sub-clan of the Darod, and is a dual citizen of Somalia and the United States.

Warfa was elected in 2016 as a member of the Parliament of Somalia and Secretary General of the Defense Committee.

He is the founder and Executive Director of Fagaaraha Forum, a town hall meeting format that discussed issues facing Somalis in the United States, Somalia, and elsewhere abroad.

Warfa was elected as Deputy Director of Somali Diaspora at the June 2014 Diaspora Conference held in Istanbul, Turkey. He was Executive Director of Somail Diaspora.

Warfa has advocated for the rights of Somali-Americans. He assisted family members of those arrested and incarcerated when they were charged with crimes affecting the community.

In 2010, he campaigned for Minnesota's State Representative District 61A seat. He was the first Somali–American to compete for any state legislative seats. In 2011, he competed for a Minnesota State Senate District 61 seat in a special election and came in second in the six-person Democratic primary.
