= War Galoh =

- Town
- Location in Somalia.
- Coordinates: 6°17′0″N 47°31′0″E
- Country: Somalia
- Region: Mudug
- Time zone: UTC+3 (EAT)

War Galoh is a town in the north-central Mudug region of Somalia.
