= Balanbale district =

Balabale Balanballe
- City
- Location in Somalia
- Coordinates: 05°41′21″N 45°58′11″E
- Country: Somalia
- State: Galmudug
- Region: Galguduud

Government
  - Type: Mayor-Council-Commission
  - Mayor: Iraad Hashi Ali gure
- Time zone: UTC+3 (EAT)
- Area code: 061

Balanbale (Somali: Balanballe), also spelled as Balanbal, is the district in Galguduud region of Somalia. In recent times Balanbale was developing rapidly. As of 2016, some projects are under enlargement construction.

Balanbale and Goldogob were announced as a district by Somali government led by Jaalle Mohamed Siyaad Bare President of Somalia in 1982; from that time Balanbale has served as the center of the Balanbale District.

Balanbale is situated in the western part of Galguduud region bordering Ethiopia's Somali Regional State. It has a close relationship both economically and socially, and it plays a key role between Somali region of Ethiopia and Somalia.

== Geography ==
Balanbale is situated in central Somalia, near kilinka Shanad. The city is situated about 90 km west of Dusamareb, the capital of Galguduud province.

== Villages ==
Balanbele is subdivided into several administrative districts:

- Dhagax-barkato
- Canjiidle
- Oktoobar
- Waaberi
- Turbi
