= Balanbale, Togdheer =

Balanbale
- Town
- Location in Somaliland.
- Coordinates: 8°25′N 46°40′E
- Country: Somaliland
- Region: Togdheer
- District: Buuhoodle District
- Time zone: UTC+3 (EAT)

Balanbale (Somali: Balanbaale) is a town in the Togdheer region of Somaliland.

== See also ==
- Administrative divisions of Somaliland
- Regions of Somaliland
- Districts of Somaliland
- Somalia–Somaliland border
