= Galdogob District =

Galdogob
- District
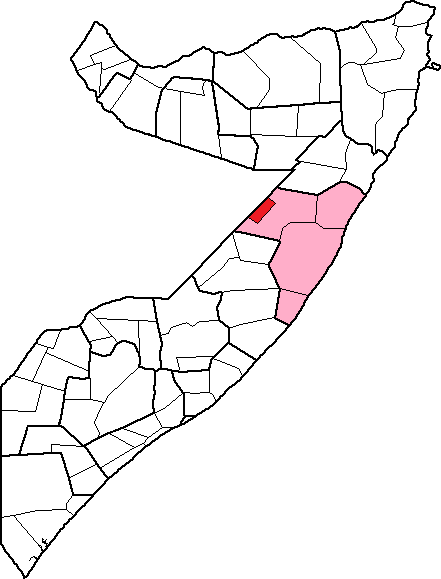
- Location of Galdogob district within Mudug region
- Country: Somalia
- Regional State: Puntland
- Region: Mudug
- Capital: Galdogob

Government
- Time zone: UTC+3 (EAT)

Galdogob District (Somali: Degmada Galdogob) is a district in the north-central Mudug region of Somalia. Its capital is Galdogob.
