= Galkayo =

City in Mudug, Puntland

Galkayo Gaalkacyo جالكعيو
- City
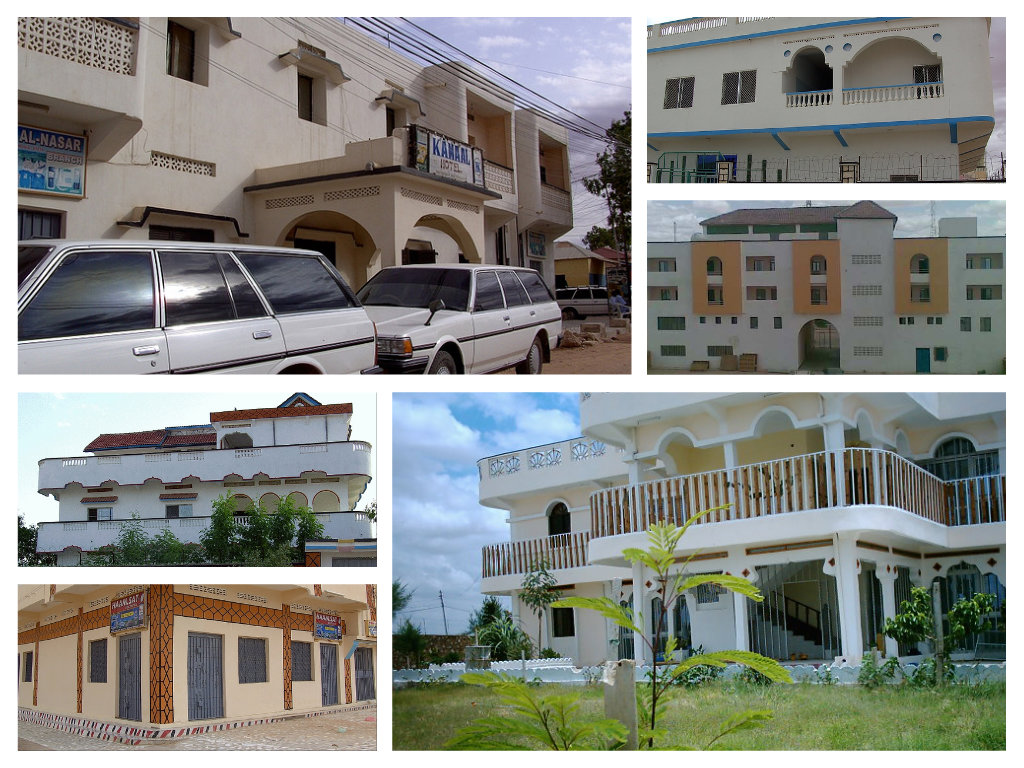

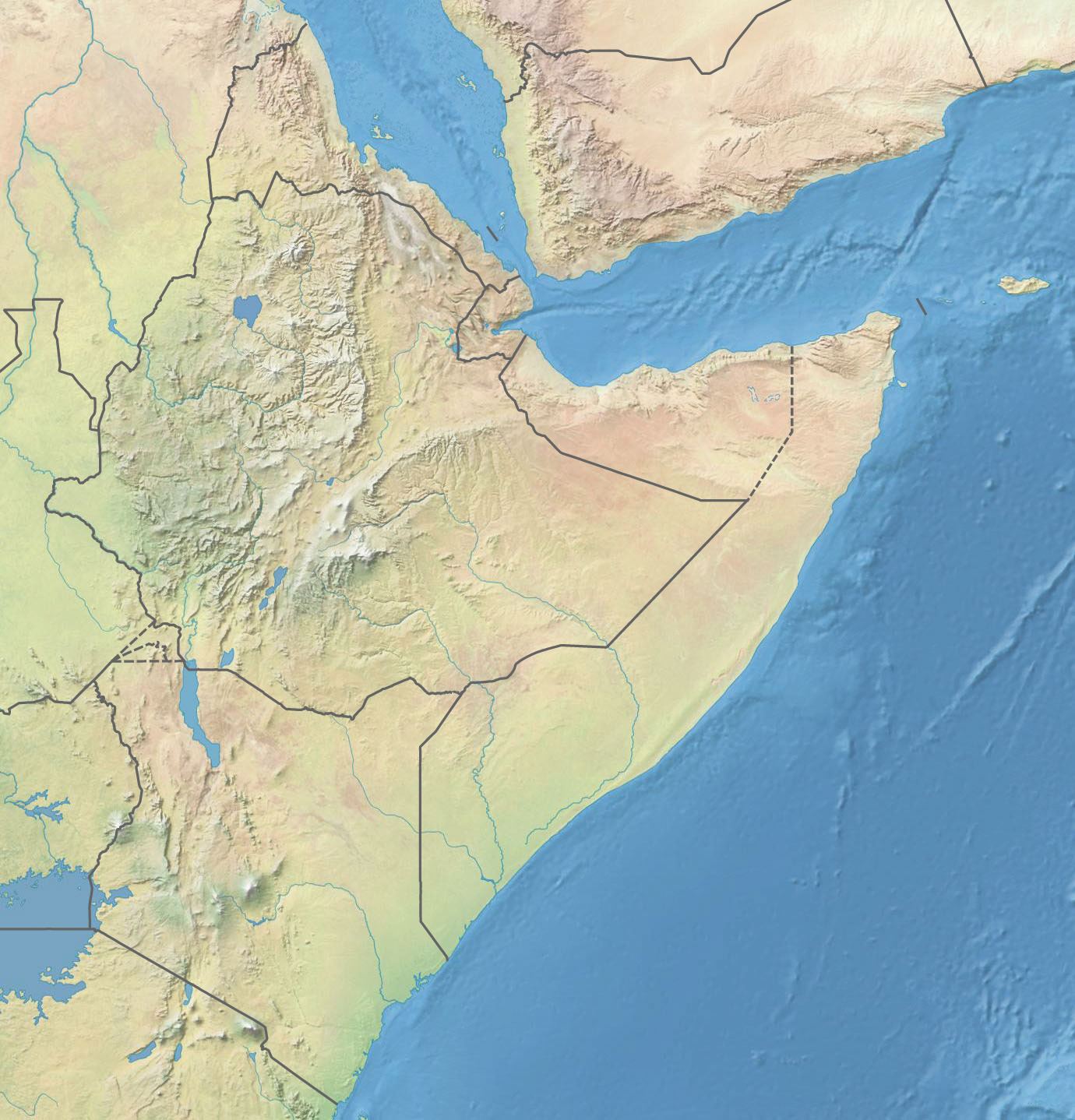
- Location within Somalia Location within the Horn of Africa Location within Africa
- Coordinates: 06°46′11″N 047°25′51″E
- Country: Somalia
- Regional State: Puntland; Galmudug
- Region: Mudug
- District: Galkacyo

Government
  - Mayors: Mohamed Abdirasak Warsame (ilguuyo) (Puntland); Mohamud Abdullahi Kulmiye (Galmudug)

Population (2020)
  - Total: 545,000 (Puntland-administered section)
- Time zone: UTC+3 (EAT)
- Climate: BWh

Galkayo (Somali: Gaalkacyo, Arabic: جالكعيو, Italian: Gallacaio, also known as Rocca Littorio) is a city in Somalia and serves as the capital of the north-central Mudug region.

Geographically, Galkayo is divided into four main quarters: Garsoor, Horumar, Israac, and Wadajir. Galkayo is divided between the regional states of Puntland and Galmudug. It serves as the capital of the Galkayo District as well as the Mudug region, and it has grown considerably in recent times, becoming a commercial hub connecting southern Somalia with the northern parts of the country.

== History ==
At its founding, the city was primarily inhabited by pastoralists, who sporadically fought in clan groups over resources like water and grazing land. In particular, the Darod, dominant in the north of the city, and the Hawiye, dominant in the south of the city, fought over the city due to their long-standing rivalry.

Galkayo was formally established in the late 19th century by Sultan Yusuf Ali Kenadid of the Hobyo Sultanate. Kenadid, as part of an ongoing power struggle with his rivals in the Majeerteen Sultanate, signed a treaty with the Kingdom of Italy to become a protectorate, thereby passing the city into nominal Italian control. Under Italian rule, the city's communities were split along the "Tomaselli Line" to prevent further conflict between the Darod and the Hawiye.

After World War II, Italian Somaliland became the Trust Territory of Somalia under the guidance of the United Nations. At this time, the city saw significant unity among rival groups due to growing Somali nationalism, spurred by the growing influence of the Somali Youth League, a Somali nationalist political party. Following the independence of Somalia in 1960, Galkayo was made the center of Galkayo District and the capital of Mudug region.

The city fell back into conflict during the rule of Siad Barre, who actively took advantage of class differences within the city to exercise his power. In particular, Barre, a member of a Darod subclan, backed the Darod people in their struggle over the city. On 12 November 1989, a group of Hawiye officers mutinied against Barre's regime for this clan favoritism. This mutiny was put down a day later by a militia led by Maslah Mohammed Barre, Siad Barre's son. Hawiye villages around Galkayo were punished in response to the mutiny by Barre's militia, furthering the divide between them and the Darod, and leading to a subsequent mutiny in Mogadishu on 5 December 1989.

During the Somali Civil War, the Hawiye rebel organization United Somali Congress attacked Darod elements in Galkayo, starting a major clan war surrounding the city and Mudug region as a whole. The fighting clans drew administrative borders through the city, splitting it between the Darod-controlled Puntland and the Hawiye-controlled Galmudug, strengthening the divide between them. As the fighting of the Somali Civil War became more violent, the United Nations intervened with United Nations Operation in Somalia II, and negotiated peace within the Mudug region and the withdrawal of militant fighters from Galkayo.

In June 1993, in order to end the fighting in Galkayo, it was decided to relocate the militias that were in conflict in the city to Wargalo, Buryaqab (Harfo) and Galdogob, which are 70 kilometers away.

Conflicts between Puntland and Galmudug authorities continued to erupt over the status of Galkayo. In November 2015, anger over the construction of a road in Puntland caused a skirmish which left 20 dead, 120 injured, and 90,000 displaced. Another conflict arose in October 2016 over construction rights in a disputed area of the city, which saw a ceasefire agreement meant to allow free transport of goods and people between the two administrations and establish a joint police force to protect the entire city.

== Geography ==
=== Location ===
Galkayo is situated in north-central Somalia, in the heart of the Mudug region. Nearby settlements include to the east Godad (7.1 nm), to the northeast Bali busle (16.2 nm), to the north Halobooqad (4.4 nm), to the northwest Beyra (12.8 nm), to the west Xera Jaale-bayra (23.8 nm), to the southwest Saaxo (30 nm), to the south Laascadale (10.2 nm), and to the southeast Arfuda (13.0 nm). The largest cities in the country most proximate to Galkayo are Galdogob (60 km), Hobyo (217 km), Garowe (219 km) and Qardho (358 km). Shimbiris, the highest peak in Somalia, is located some 432 km to the north in the Cal Madow mountain range.

=== Climate ===
Galkayo has a hot arid climate (Köppen BWh).

Climate data for Galkayo
Month	Jan	Feb	Mar	Apr	May	Jun	Jul	Aug	Sep	Oct	Nov	Dec	Year
Record high °C (°F)	39.0 (102.2)	39.8 (103.6)	42.8 (109.0)	47.2 (117.0)	47.0 (116.6)	40.3 (104.5)	36.5 (97.7)	42.5 (108.5)	40.0 (104.0)	43.0 (109.4)	40.0 (104.0)	37.5 (99.5)	47.2 (117.0)
Mean daily maximum °C (°F)	32.5 (90.5)	33.5 (92.3)	34.9 (94.8)	36.0 (96.8)	35.2 (95.4)	34.1 (93.4)	32.6 (90.7)	33.1 (91.6)	34.3 (93.7)	33.6 (92.5)	33.6 (92.5)	33.0 (91.4)	33.9 (93.0)
Daily mean °C (°F)	25.2 (77.4)	26.2 (79.2)	27.6 (81.7)	29.1 (84.4)	28.9 (84.0)	28.4 (83.1)	27.2 (81.0)	27.5 (81.5)	28.0 (82.4)	27.8 (82.0)	26.8 (80.2)	26.1 (79.0)	27.4 (81.3)
Mean daily minimum °C (°F)	17.9 (64.2)	18.7 (65.7)	20.4 (68.7)	22.2 (72.0)	22.7 (72.9)	22.6 (72.7)	21.9 (71.4)	21.9 (71.4)	21.8 (71.2)	22.0 (71.6)	20.0 (68.0)	19.2 (66.6)	20.9 (69.6)
Record low °C (°F)	11.0 (51.8)	13.0 (55.4)	13.0 (55.4)	17.0 (62.6)	17.0 (62.6)	16.0 (60.8)	18.9 (66.0)	17.0 (62.6)	18.0 (64.4)	15.0 (59.0)	12.0 (53.6)	13.1 (55.6)	11.0 (51.8)
Average rainfall mm (inches)	0 (0)	3 (0.1)	1 (0.0)	24 (0.9)	60 (2.4)	2 (0.1)	0 (0)	2 (0.1)	1 (0.0)	41 (1.6)	14 (0.6)	1 (0.0)	149 (5.8)
Average rainy days (≥ 0.1 mm)	0	0	0	2	5	0	0	0	0	3	1	0	11
Average relative humidity (%) (at 14:00)	51	57	56	61	63	56	58	61	56	58	63	63	59
Percentage possible sunshine	80	80	77	68	66	71	61	66	72	63	74	77	71
Source 1: Deutscher Wetterdienst
Source 2: Food and Agriculture Organization: Somalia Water and Land Management (percent sunshine)

== Administration ==
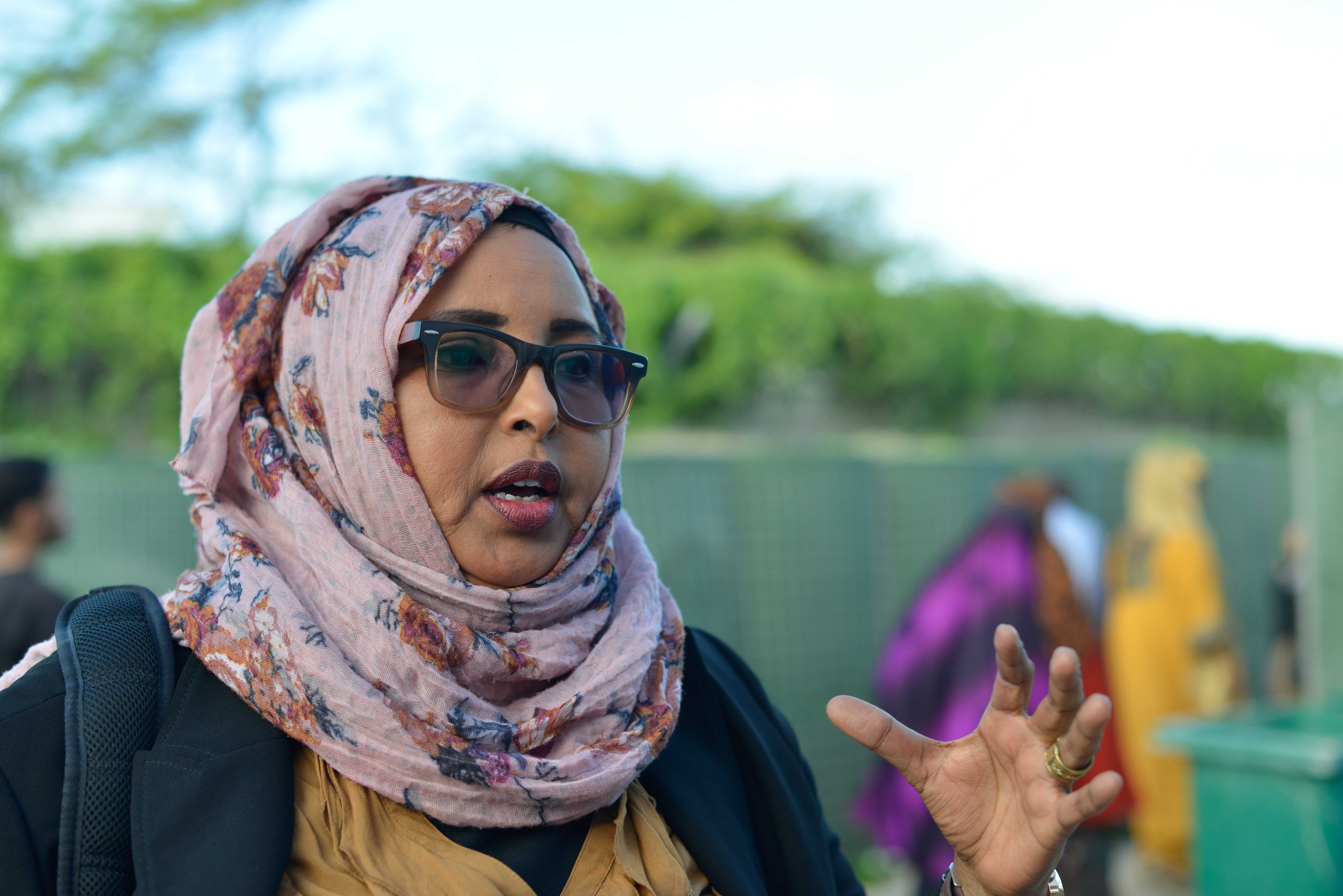
Gakayo native Asha Gelle Dirie, a former minister in the Puntland government.

Galkayo is situated in the north-central part of Somalia, and is one of the most developed towns in the region. The city is divided into four main districts called Garsoor, Horumar, Israac, and Wadajir respectively. The Puntland Administration fully controls Garsoor, Israac, and Horumar (The neutral areas are sited by the Old Galkayo market and the loose boundary.

Although relatively stable compared to southern Somalia, sporadic targeted assassination attempts by Al-Shabaab militants against Puntland public officials led to a police crackdown and comprehensive administrative reform in 2010 and 2011. The Puntland and Galmudug administrations subsequently signed an accord in Garowe in February 2011, officially agreeing to cooperate on security, economic and social matters so as to strengthen inter-regional relations.

== Services ==
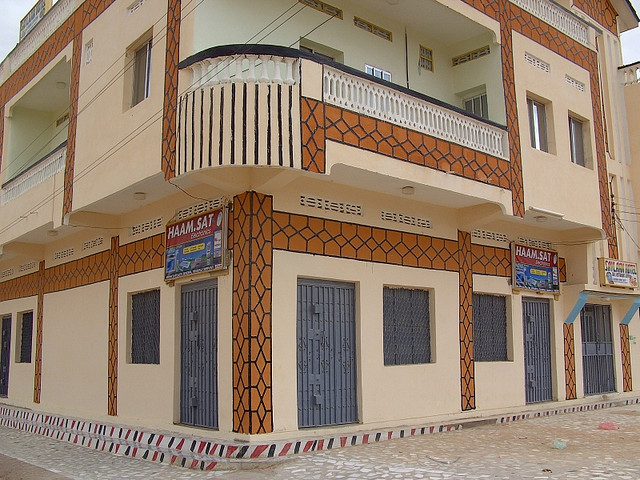
An electronics store at a Galkayo shopping mall.

A lively trading city, Galkayo is a center for local business. Hotels, guest houses, restaurants, supermarkets and newly erected office blocks earmarked for the government and NGOs line the streets, juxtaposed by the tall minarets of masjids. The city also offers numerous social services such as hospitals, petrol stops and police stations, with the former Somali Army barracks kept in good condition and renovated.

Moreover, Galkayo is a hub of calligraphic art, serving as a training ground of sorts for local visual artists. Elaborate murals and phrases in Arabic and English adorn the walls of the city's many office and shop buildings.

== Demographics ==
In 2010, the Food and Agriculture Organization noted that population estimates for Galkayo ranged from 75,000 to 315,000, with a United Nations Development Programme estimate for 2005 being 105,000. The International Crisis Group gives a figure of 137,000 for 2015.

The Puntland area of the city is composed of the Mumin Aden and the Fiqi Ismael sub-clans of Leelkase alongside the Omar Mahamud and Reer Bicidyahan sub-clans of Majerteen; as well as the Awrtable, Arab Salah, and Surre clans.

The neighborhood of Wadajir in the southern area of the city, is mainly inhabited by the Sa'ad sub-division of the Habar Gidir and the Loobage sub-clan of Sheekhaal.

== Education ==
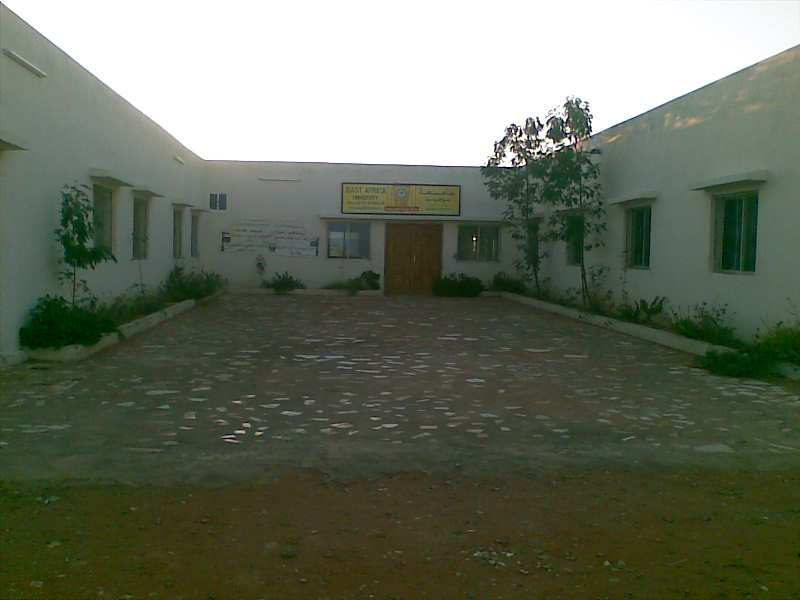
East Africa University's Galkayo campus.

Galkayo has a number of academic institutions. According to the Puntland Ministry of Education, there are 40 primary schools in the Galkayo District. Among these are the Axmed Guray school in Israac, named after Imam Ahmad ibn Ibrahim al-Ghazi (Ahmed Gurey); Al-Qudus in Horumar; and Barkhadle in Garsoor, built in honour of the 13th century scholar and saint Yusuf bin Ahmad al-Kawneyn (Aw Barkhadle). Puntland secondary schools in the area include Haji Ali Bihi, Cumar Samatar Secondary School (CSSS), Yasin Nor Hassan and Galkayo High. In addition, several new schools were opened in 2012.

Institutions of higher learning with a presence in the city include the Puntland State University, Puntland University of Science and Technology, Galkayo University, and Mudug University. East Africa University (EAU) also has a Galkayo branch, one of its seven campuses in Puntland. Additionally, the public Galkayo Vocational Training Centre and the privately owned Mudug Vocational Training Center provide technical training.

== Sports ==
Galkayo is home to Awale Stadium, a sporting facility that is named in memory of Mohammed Awale Liban, a Somali nationalist who designed the flag of Somalia in 1954. The stadium hosts many local football clubs, including FC YAMAYS, RPS FC, Dowladda Hoose FC, Comced FC, Homboboro FC, Telecom FC and Galcom FC. In addition, the city also has another stadium Abdullahi Issa stadium in the South, named after Abdullahi Issa, the Prime Minister of Italian Somalia during the trusteeship period, serving from February 29, 1956, to July 1, 1960. Various courts built specifically for basketball and volleyball also exist in the city.

== Transportation ==
Air transportation in Galacyo is served by the Abdullahi Yusuf Airport, operated by Puntland and Oshaco International Airport operated by Galmudug. Unlike Abdullahi Yusuf Airport, Oshaco International Airport does not have IATA and ICAO airport codes as it is not recognized by any international entity. In September 2013, the Somali federal government signed an official cooperation agreement with its Chinese counterpart in Mogadishu as part of a five-year national recovery plan. The pact will see the Chinese authorities reconstruct several major infrastructural landmarks in the Somali capital and elsewhere, as well as the road linking Galkayo with Burao.

== Media ==
Various media organizations are based in Galkayo. These include Radio Daljir, Radio Galmudug and Radio Codka-Mudug. Radio Gaalkacyo, formerly known as Radio Free Somalia, also broadcasts from the city.

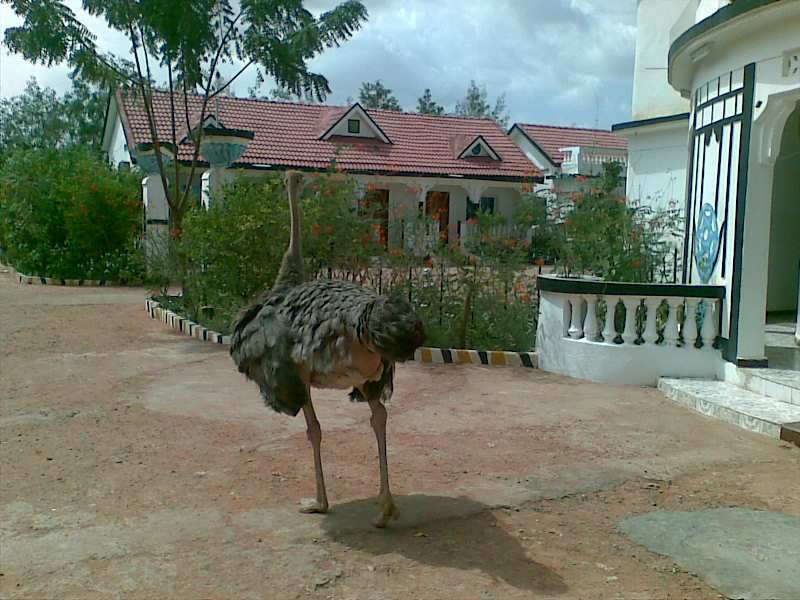
Domesticated ostrich at the Taar City Hotel in Galkayo.

== Neighborhoods ==
Galkayo consists of the following neighborhoods: Israac, Horumar, Garsoor and Wadajir.

== Notable residents ==
- Abdullahi Yusuf Ahmed - President of Somalia (2004-2008) and Founding Father of Puntland state.
- Asha Gelle Dirie – former Minister of Women Development and Family Affairs of Puntland.
- Waris Dirie – model, actress, author and activist.
- Mohammed Awale Liban - Designer of the Flag of Somalia in 1954, born in eastern Galkacyo, Puntland.
- Ahmed Duale Gelle - President of Galmudug, businessman and former federal MP.
- Zakaria Mohamed Haji-Abdi – leader of the Alliance for the Re-liberation of Somalia.
- Abdulkadir Abdi Hashi – MP in Federal Parliament, and former State Minister of the Presidency for Planning and International Relations of Puntland.
- Abdirizak Haji Hussein – former Prime Minister of Somalia, and former Secretary General of the Somali Youth League.
- Abdi Bashiir Indhobuur - poet and playwright who composed of many patriotic songs.
- Mohamed Farrah Aidid, Chairman of the United Somali Congress that toppled Dictator Siad Barre, battled US Delta forces and UNOSOM during Operation Restore Hope and President of Somalia before his Death, 1987–1996
- Abdi Qeybdiid – former President of Galmudug, and former Interior Minister of Somalia.
- Ali Haji Warsame - First Director of Management at Port of Bosaso and presidential candidate at the Puntland presidential election, 2014.
- Mohamed Warsame Ali – first President of Galmudug, former Ambassador of Somalia to the US, former Minister of Commerce, Public Works, and Sports and Youth Affairs.

== See also ==
- Galmudug
- Puntland
