= Galdogob =

Galdogob Galdogob
- City
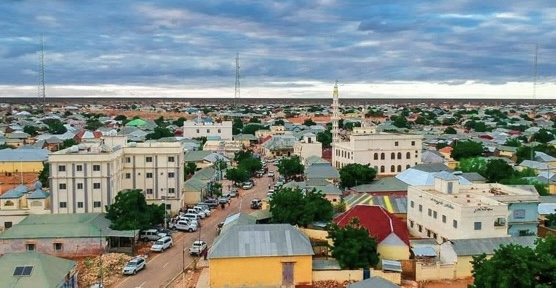
- Aerial view of Galdogob

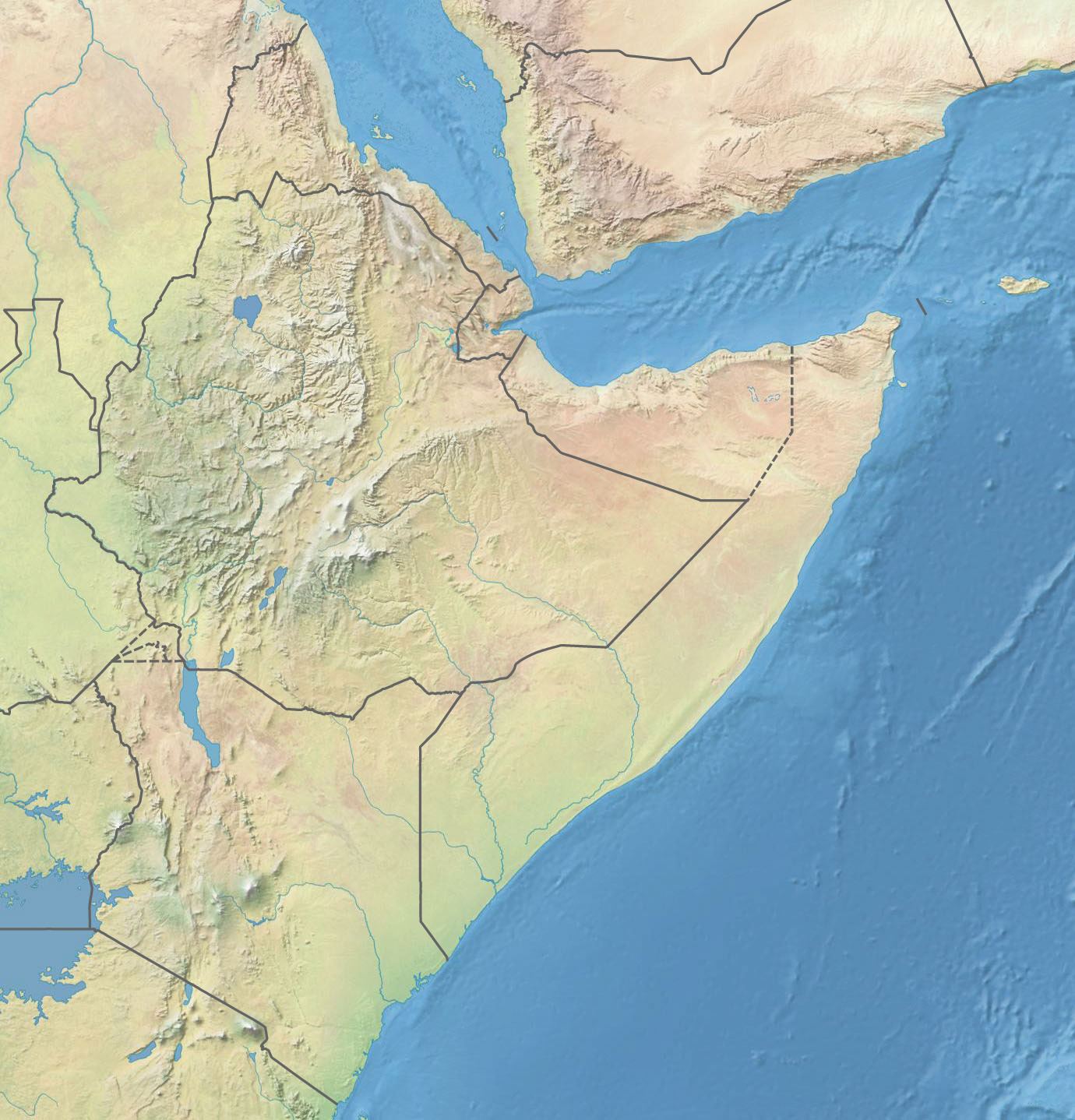
- Location within Somalia Location within the Horn of Africa Location within Africa
- Coordinates: 7°1′50″N 47°1′10″E
- Country: Somalia
- Regional State: Puntland
- Region: Mudug
- District: Galdogob

Government
  - Mayor: Ayahle Ahmed Farah
- Elevation: 20 m (66 ft)

Population
  - Total: 159,249
- Time zone: UTC+3 (EAT)

Galdogob (Somali: Galdogob) is a town that is administered by the semi-autonomous Puntland State of Somalia, and serves as the capital of the Galdogob District within the Mudug region. The city technically straddles the disputed 1950s-era Provisional Administrative Line, as depicted on virtually all worldwide maps, from north-central Somalia.

== Overview ==
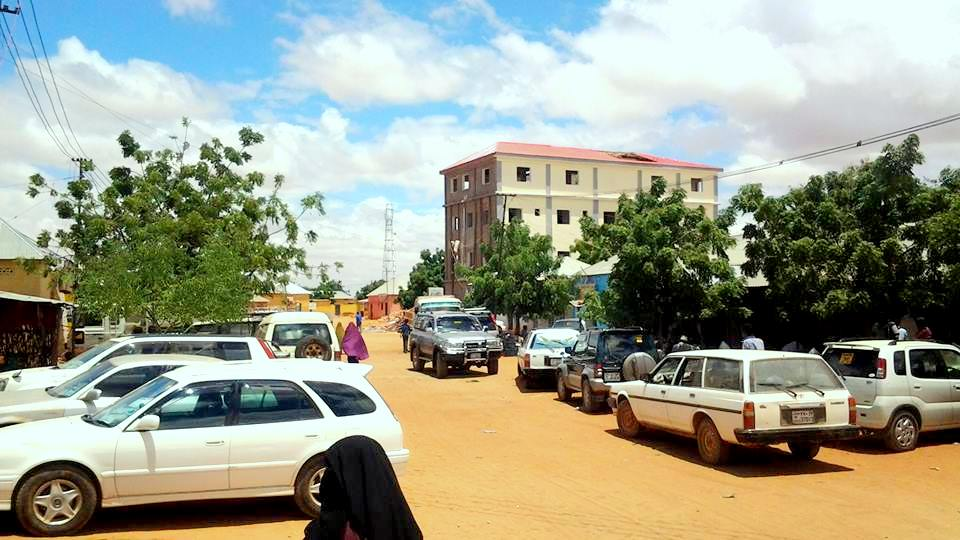
Galdogob

Galdogob is located in the western part of the Mudug region bordering Ethiopia's portion of the Somali-majority Dollo Zone, and is a popular rest stop for Somali travelers heading to and from Dire Dawa, Jijiga, Gode, Werder and Geladi. Hundreds of small cars and heavy trucks pass through the city every day. In 1982, Galdogob briefly fell in the hands of the Ethiopian backed group SSDF in the 1982 Ethiopian–Somali Border War.

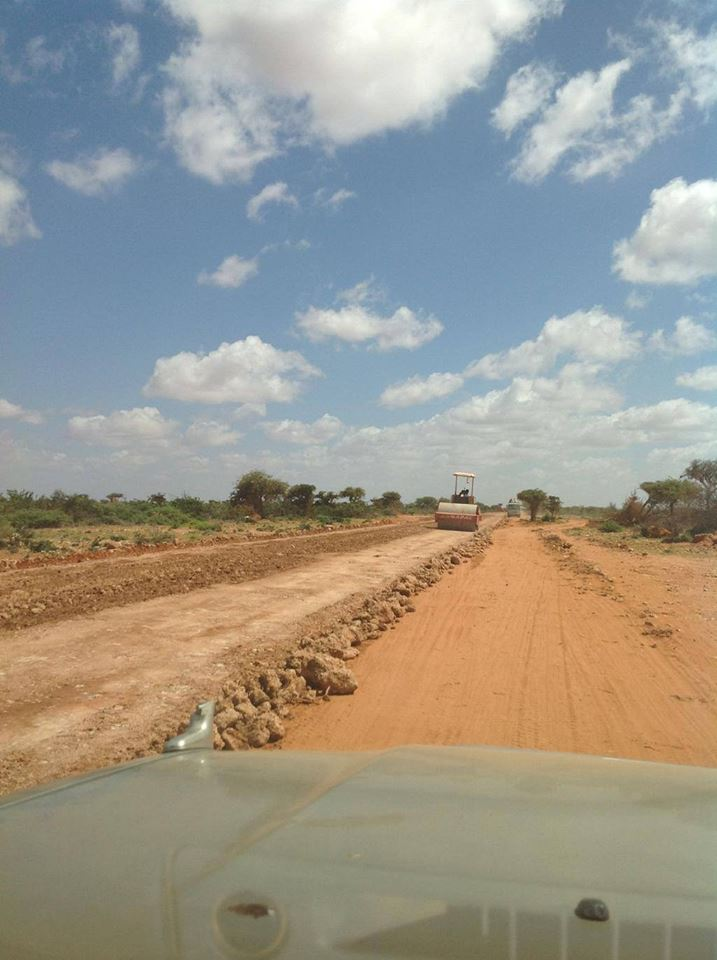
Galdogob-Galkayo road construction.

Galdogob also has a thriving livestock industry: hundreds of thousands of camels, sheep, goats and cattle are purchased here and shipped through the busy port of Bosaso every year. The city's livestock trade is at its most brisk during the hajj period, when over a hundred thousand heads of livestock are sold and shipped to the Gulf states, again through Bosaso. Galdogob has recently also seen the arrival of migrants from the more southernly areas of Somalia seeking work and a safer place to live.

The second largest hospital in the region, Galdogob general hospital, is located in this town, which serves both residents and surrounding areas. In October 2014, the firm Tawakal Money Express (Tawakal) began construction of the four-storey Tawakal Plaza Galdogob. The building features a Tawakal Global Bank customer and financial services center, conference and event halls, restaurant and coffee shop facilities, and a luxury hotel. In 2016 Tawakal Money Express finished building a large multi purpose structure in Galdogob market area.

Galdogob and the surrounding region are served by the Galdogob Airport. A major renovation of the facility was launched in 2020 and the first scheduled flight departed in 2022. The airport was inaugurated by Fardowsa Osman Egal, the Minister of Transport and Civil Aviation of Somalia with the event attended by several officers from Puntland.

== Demographics ==
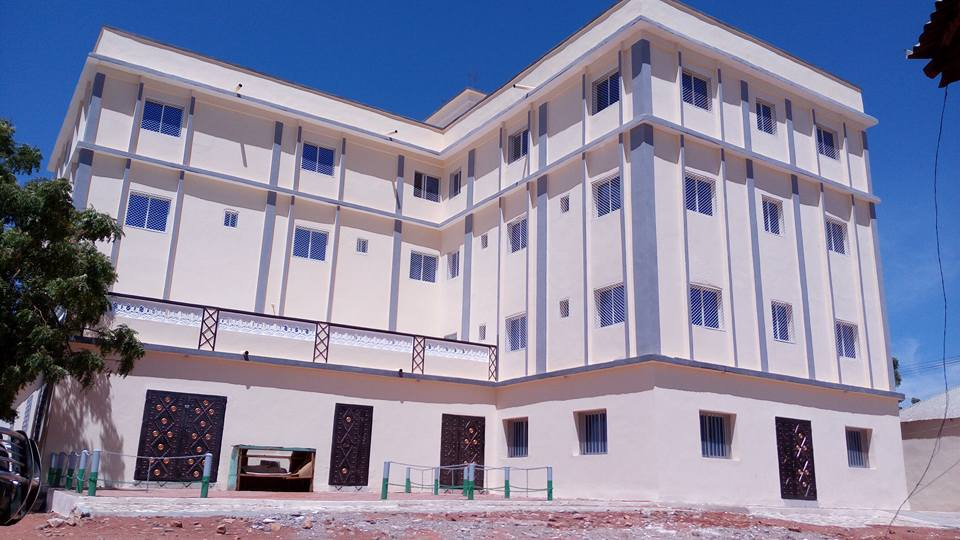
Tawakal Bank

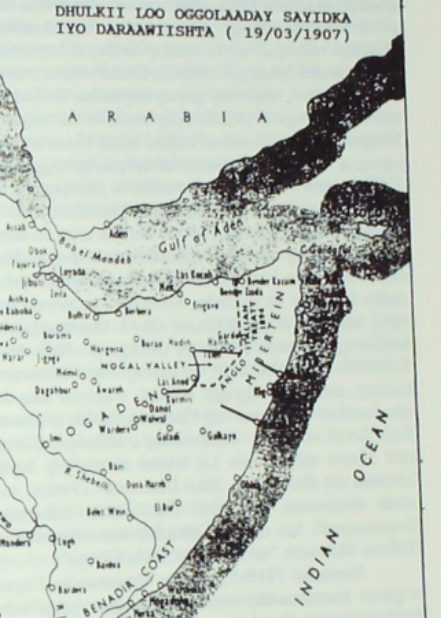
Territory of Dervish leader Diiriye Guure in 1907 (marked out in black ink delineation), according to Somali historian Muxamed Ibraahim Muxamed, consisted of the Ciid-Nugaal regions of Nugaal province, Las Anod District, Xudun District, Taleh District, Boocame District and Bookh District, including Galdogob

As of 2005, the broader Galdogob District had a total population of 309,799 residents, out of it 247,366 were urban and 67,067 were non-urban.

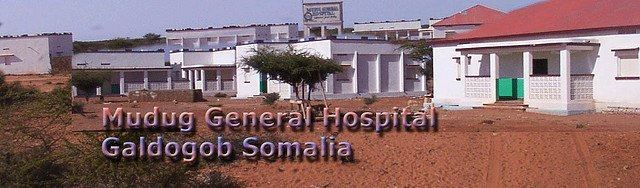
Galdogob General Hospital

== Climate ==
Galdogob has a hot arid climate (Köppen BWh). The coldest average temperatures occur during the winter months of November to February, when thermometer readings range from 23 to 25 °C (73 to 77 °F). The weather slowly heats up in the spring, as the April rainy season begins. Average temperatures later reach a maximum of around 41 °C over the summer period. Come September, a gradual fall chill starts to set in again.

Climate data for Galdogob
Month	Jan	Feb	Mar	Apr	May	Jun	Jul	Aug	Sep	Oct	Nov	Dec	Year
Mean daily maximum °C (°F)	30 (86)	29 (84)	30 (86)	31 (88)	34 (93)	39 (102)	41 (106)	41 (106)	38 (100)	33 (91)	31 (88)	30 (86)	34 (93)
Mean daily minimum °C (°F)	24 (75)	24 (75)	24 (75)	26 (79)	27 (81)	30 (86)	32 (90)	31 (88)	29 (84)	25 (77)	25 (77)	23 (73)	27 (80)
Average precipitation mm (inches)	15 (0.6)	0 (0)	1 (0.0)	15 (0.6)	5 (0.2)	5 (0.2)	33 (1.3)	20 (0.8)	15 (0.6)	14 (0.6)	5 (0.2)	5 (0.2)	133 (5.3)
Source: AccuWeather

== Education ==
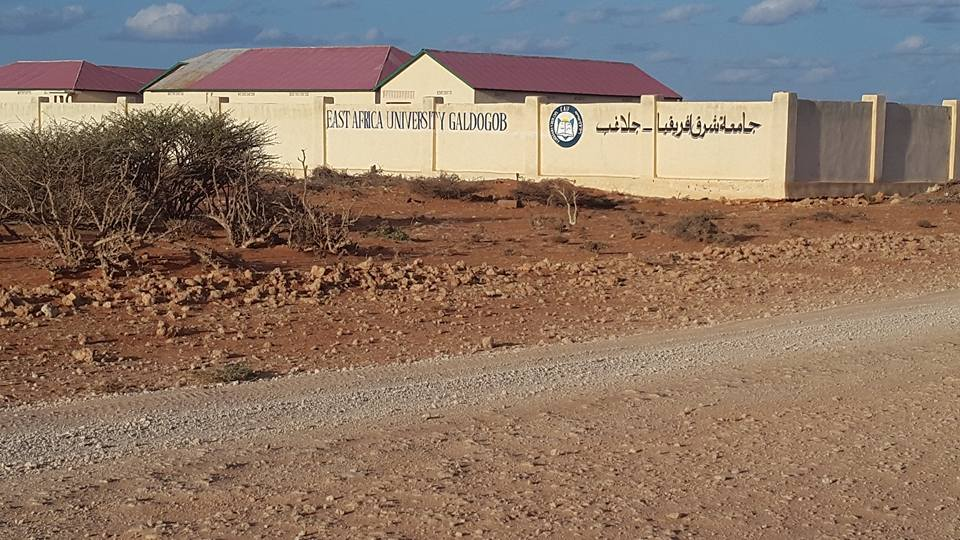

Galdogob has several academic institutions. According to the Puntland Ministry of Education, there are 25 primary schools and 5 secondary schools in the Galdogob District. Among these are Ciro, Al-Nur Galdogob, Kulmiye Galdogob and Qansaxle. Secondary schools in the area include Ain Shams and Galdogob Secondary. Higher learning is provided by AED informal education college, and Puntland State University [PSU].

== Notable residents ==
- Said Sheikh Samatar (1943– 24 February 2015) – scholar and writer
- Sadik Warfa – Member of the Somalia Parliament and Minister for Labour and social affairs of the Somali government
