= Mudug =

Region of Somalia

- Region
- Location in Somalia
- Coordinates: 6°08′N 48°00′E
- Country: Somalia
- Regional State: Puntland; Galmudug
- Capital: Galkayo

Government
  - Governor: Abdirashid Hashi Artan and Xasan Maxamed Khaliif Abgaalow

Area
  - Total: 72,933 km^{2} (28,160 sq mi)

Population (2019)
  - Total: 864,700
  - Density: 11.86/km^{2} (30.71/sq mi)
- Demonym: Mudugian
- Time zone: UTC+3 (EAT)
- ISO 3166 code: SO-MU
- HDI (2021): 0.374 low · 7th of 18

Mudug (Somali: Mudug) is an administrative region (gobol) in north-central Somalia. Spread across an area of 72,933 km^{2} (28,160 sq mi), the northern section of Mudug is part of Puntland whilst the majority of Mudug is part of Galmudug State, both of which are autonomous states within the Federal Republic of Somalia. It features a rural economy based largely on pastoralist livelihoods and limited agriculture. The security environment is volatile due to inter-clan feuds and conflicting jurisdiction, which has resulted in humanitarian and governance challenges.

== Geography ==
Mudug is an administrative region (gobol) in north-central Somalia. Spread across an area of 72,933 km^{2} (28,160 sq mi), the northern half of Mudug is part of Puntland whilst the southern half is part of Galmudug State, both of which are autonomous states within the Federal Republic of Somalia. Physiographically, it is bordered by Ethiopia to the west, by the Somali regions of Nugal and Galguduud to the north and south respectively, and the Indian Ocean on the east. The provincial capital is Galkayo. Constisting of five districts—Galdogob, Galkayo and Jariban in Puntland, and the Harardhere and Hobyo districts in Galmudug—the region has been characterised by political polarisation. The districts are further subdivided into villages such as Dajimale, Galbarwaaqo, Halabokhad, Roox, Dalsan-Mudug, and War Galoh.

== Demographics and economy ==
As of 2019, Mudug had a population of 864,700 inhabitants. The economy is predominantly pastoral and agro-pastoral including livestock. Mudug experiences armed conflicts due to inter-clan violence, and different controlling authorities in the region. These conflicts have resulted in multiple civilian fatalities, and displacement of thousands. The volatile security environment has resulted in humanitarian and governance challenges.

== See also ==
- Hilalaye
