= Mohamed Mohamud Ibrahim =

Somali politician (born 1946)

Mohamed Mohamud Ibrahim محمد محمود ابراهيم

Deputy Foreign Minister of Somalia
- Incumbent
- Assumed office August 2011 – February 2012
- Prime Minister: Abdiweli Mohamed Ali

Personal details
- Born: 1946 (age 79–80)
- Party: Transitional Federal Government

Mohamed Mohamud Ibrahim (Somali: Maxamed Maxamuud Ibrahiim, Arabic: محمد محمود ابراهيم) (born 1946) is a Somali politician.

== Biography ==
From 2008 to 2011, Ibrahim lived in the Harlesden area of London in the United Kingdom, where he worked as an English support teacher at the Newman Catholic College.

Since August 2011, he has served as Deputy Prime Minister and Minister of Foreign Affairs of Somalia, under incumbent Premier Abdiweli Mohamed Ali and Foreign Minister Mohamed Abdullahi Omaar.
