= Presidency of Sharif Sheikh Ahmed =

Sharif Sheikh Ahmed's tenure as the 7th President of Somalia began with his inauguration on 31 January 2009 and ended on 20 August, 2012. His administration successfully brought the Federal Government of Somalia through transitional status following the collapse of the previous governing administration in 1991.

== 2009 presidential elections ==
An indirect presidential election was held in Somalia on 30 January 2009. Due to the security situation in Baidoa, it was held in Djibouti. The Transitional Federal Parliament elected ARS chairman Sheikh Sharif Sheikh Ahmed, to the office of President of Somalia in January 2009.

President Sharif appointed Omar Abdirashid Ali Sharmarke, the son of the assassinated President Abdirashid Ali Sharmarke, as the nation's new Prime Minister.

== Counter insurgency ==
With the help of the growing African Union regional intervention force AMISOM, the government began a counteroffensive in February 2009 to seize more control of the southern half of the country. Al-Shabaab and Hizbul Islam, the two main Islamist groups in opposition, began to fight amongst themselves in mid-2009.

As a truce, in March 2009, Somalia's government announced that it would re-implement Shari'a as the nation's official judicial system. However, conflict continued in the southern and central parts of the country. Within months, the government had gone from holding about 70% of south-central Somalia's conflict zones, territory which it had inherited from the previous Yusuf administration, to losing control of over 80% of the disputed territory to the Islamist insurgents.

Sharif established military, police and security forces to fight against Al-Shabaab and restore peace, security and the rule of law to Somalia. With the help of the African Union, AMISOM his government drove Al-Shabaab from the capital city and its surroundings.

== Reforms ==
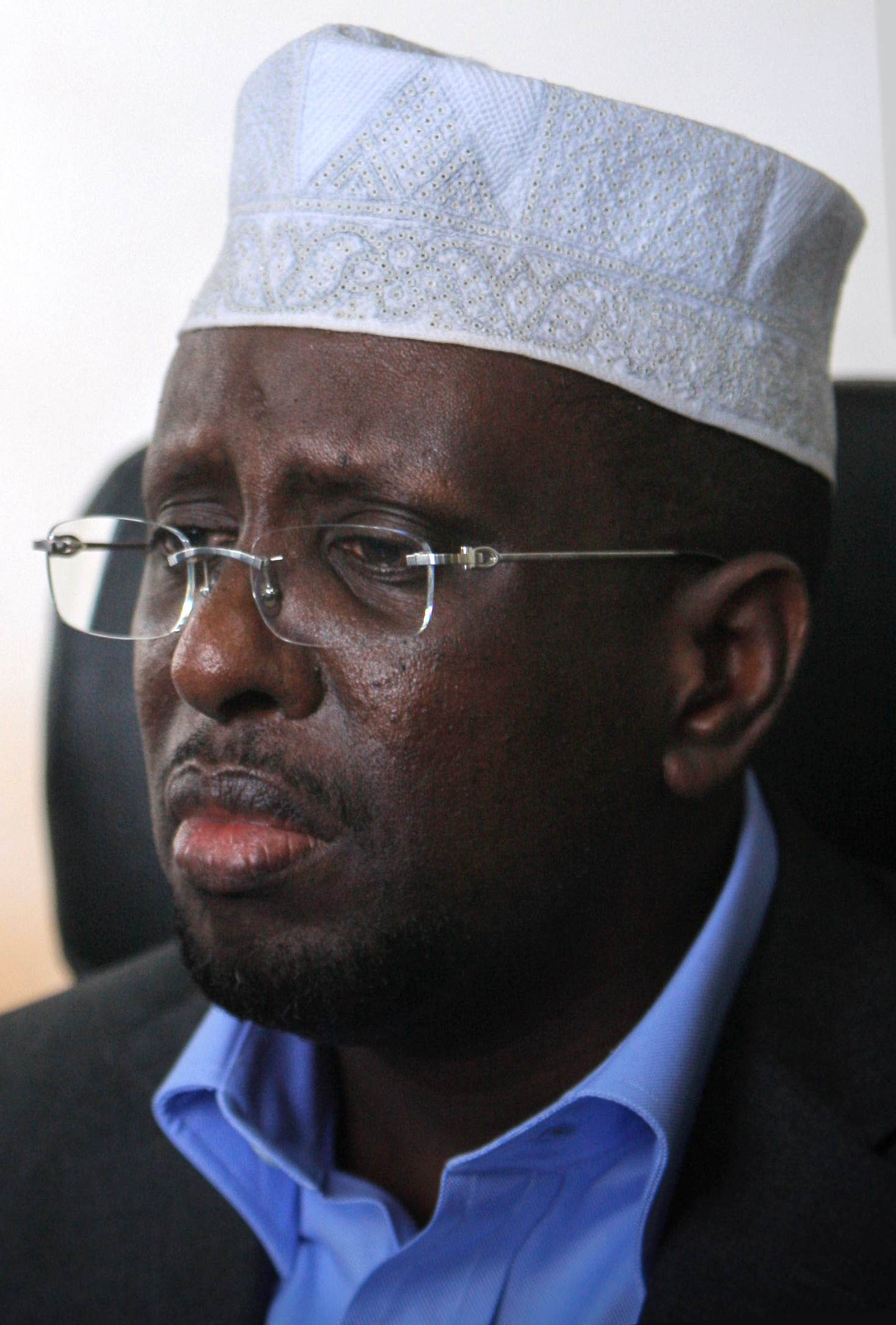
Sharif Sheikh Ahmed

Sharif's government enacted numerous political reforms since taking office in 2009. One of its first changes involved ensuring that all government institutions, which had previously been spread out in various areas throughout the country, were now based in Mogadishu, the nation's capital. The Central Bank of Somalia was also re-established, and a national plan as well as an effective anti-corruption commission were put into place. In July 2009, Somalia's Transitional Federal Government hired global professional services firm PricewaterhouseCoopers to monitor development funding and serving as a trustee of an account in Mogadishu for the security, healthcare and education sectors. This was followed in November of that year with a $2 million agreement between the government and the African Development Bank (AfDB), which saw Somalia re-engage with the AfDB after nearly two decades of interruption. The grant is aimed at providing financial and technical assistance; specifically, to develop a sound legal framework for monetary and fiscal institutions and human and institutional capacity building, as well as to establish public financial systems that are transparent.

Similarly, the autonomous Puntland region's new administration, which took office in early 2009, has also implemented numerous reforms such as the expansion and improvement of its security and judicial sectors. According to Garowe Online, to bolster the region's justice system, numerous new prosecutors, judges and other court personnel as well as additional prison guards were hired and trained. In July 2010, the Puntland Council of Ministers unanimously approved a new anti-terrorism law to more efficiently handle terror suspects and their accomplices; a special court is also expected to be established within the region's existing criminal courts system to facilitate the task. Fiscally, a transparent, budget-based public finance system was established, which has reportedly helped increase public confidence in government. In addition, a new regional constitution was drafted and later passed on 15 June 2009, which is believed to represent a significant step toward the eventual introduction of a multi-party political system to the region for the first time; such a system already exists in the adjacent Somaliland region. More modest reforms were also put into motion in the social sector, particularly in the education and healthcare fields. The regional government has hired more healthcare workers and teachers, with major plans underway for school and hospital renovations. One of the most significant new reforms enacted by the incumbent Puntland administration is the launching in May 2009 of the Puntland Agency for Social Welfare (PASWE), the first organization of its kind in Somali history. The agency provides medical, educational and counseling support to vulnerable groups and individuals such as orphans, the disabled and the blind. PASWE is overseen by a Board of Directors, which consists of religious scholars (ulema), businesspeople, intellectuals and traditional elders.

The TFG also formed an alliance with the Ahlu Sunna Waljama'a, a moderate Sufi militia.

Sharif appointed former First Secretary of the Somali embassy in Washington, Mohamed Abdullahi Mohamed, as the new Prime Minister of Somalia in October 2010 after the resignation of Omar Abdirashid Ali Sharmarke.

Sharif engaged in the development of the Somali constitution and the selection of the traditional elders who then chose members of the new parliament. The Independent Constitutional Commission were appointed to engage Somali constitutional lawyers, religious scholars and experts in Somali culture over the nation's upcoming new constitution, a key part of the government's Transitional Federal Tasks. High level federal delegations were dispatched to defuse clan-related tensions in several regions. To improve transparency, cabinet ministers fully disclosed their assets and signed a code of ethics.

An Anti-Corruption Commission with the power to carry out formal investigations and to review government decisions and protocols was established to more closely monitor all activities by public officials. Unnecessary trips abroad by members of government were prohibited, and all travel by ministers required the Premier’s consent. A budget outlining 2011’s federal expenditures was put before and approved by members of parliament, with the payment of civil service employees prioritized. In addition, a full audit of government property and vehicles was being put into place. The new government and its AMISOM allies managed to secure control of Mogadishu by August 2011.

As a condition of the Kampala Accord the mandates of the president, the Parliamentary Speaker and deputies were extended until August 2012, and Mohamed resigned from his position as prime minister on 19 June 2011. Abdiweli Mohamed Ali, the former Minister of Planning and International Cooperation, was named as the next prime minister.
