= Abdirahman Abdishakur Warsame =

Somali politician (born 1964)

- Cabdiraxmaan Cabdishakuur Warsame
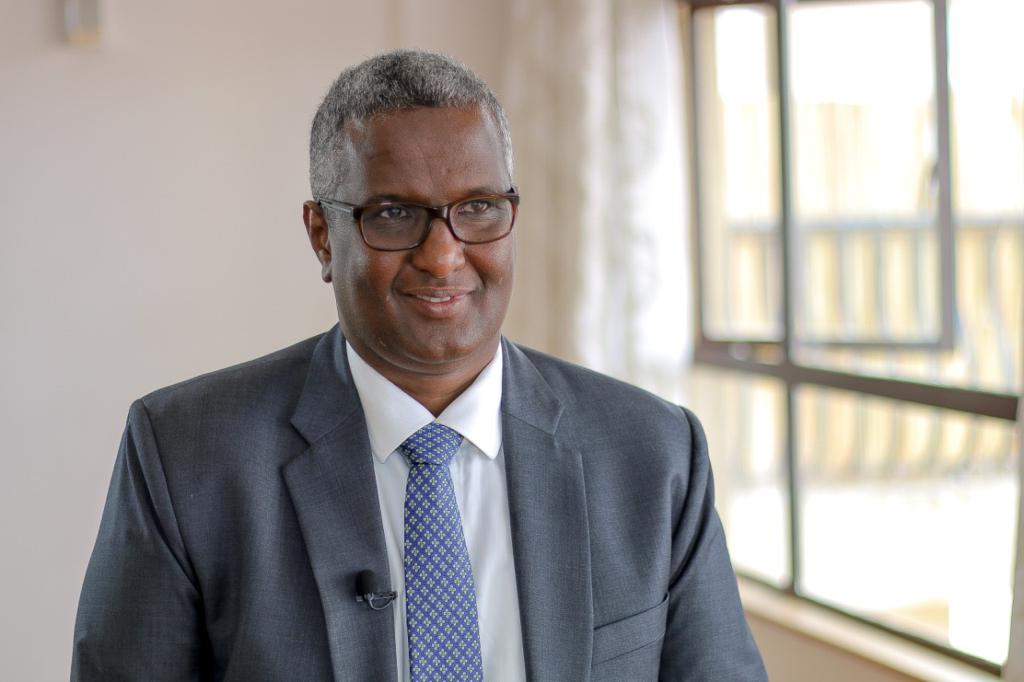

1st Special Envoy for Drought and Climate Change of Uganda
- Incumbent
- Assumed office 2022

Minister of Planning and International Cooperations
- In office 2009–2010

Deputy Chair of the ARS Central Committee
- In office 2007–2009

Personal details
- Born: ( March 22, 1964 =age 60 [Dhahar, Sanag, Somalia
- Citizenship: British; Somali
- Party: Wadajir Party
- Education: International University of Africa National University of Malaysia

Abdirahman Abdishakur Warsame (born March 22, 1964 ) is a Somali politician and a constitutional expert. He is currently the leader of the Wadajir Party.

He entered politics after joining the Alliance for the Re-liberation of Somalia (ARS) following the Ethiopian invasion and later served as a member of the Somali Parliament from 2009 to 2010. He was the Minister of Planning and International relations under President Sheikh Sharif Sheikh Ahmed between 2009 and 2010. He contested in the 2017 Somali presidential elections against Mohamed Abdullahi Farmajo. Warsame was one of the most prominent opposition politicians in Somalia.

== Early life and education ==
Abdirahman Abdishakur was born in Bulobarde town in Hiiraan region on March 22, 1964. After the Somali Civil War broke out in 1991, Abdirahman joined Al-Itihaad Al-Islamiya, but became disillusioned with the groups focus on offensive Jihad and left.

He completed his primary and secondary education in Bulobarde, before receiving a Bachelor of Law from International University of Africa in Khartoum, Sudan, Specialising in Comparative Law, in 1997.

He received a Master of Laws, Specialised in Constitutions Law, from the National University of Malaysia in 2002.

== Career ==
He was imam of Finsbury Park Mosque, taking over when Abu Hamza was arrested. Before joining politics, Warsame helped found the Somali Concern Group and the Somali Diaspora Conference. He was the executive director of Muslim Welfare Centre, the third largest centre in the United Kingdom, between 2004 and 2007. He was editor in chief of Goobjoog News Online and a deputy chief editor with Hiral Magazine in London. He is a member of the Royal Institute of International Affairs (Chatham House).

He was the chief negotiator representing the Alliance for the Re-liberation of Somalia during the Somali reconciliations held in Djibouti between 2008 and 2009, which ultimately led to the formation of the Transitional Federal Government.

On 24 May 2022, Warsame was appointed Special Envoy for Drought and Climate Change by President Hassan Sheikh Mohamoud (Xasan Sheekh Maxamuud).

== Public service ==
In 2009, Warsame became a member of the Somali Parliament. He was appointed the Minister of Planning and International Relations of the transition government in the same year.

While holding this position, Warsame was part of several diplomatic successes achieved by Somalia. For the first time in 20 years, Somalia, represented by Warsame, chaired the Arab League Foreign Ministers’ annual Summit. He was the parliament's chief negotiator at the Kampala conference, at the end of which then Parliament Speaker Sharif Hassan and President Sheikh Sharif signed the Kampala Accord, which resolved the dispute between the parliament and the executive.

After the formation of the Federal Government of Somalia in 2012, Abdirahman became a policy advisor to President Hassan Sheikh Mohamed. He was a leading member of the London conference. He also played a part in the agreement signed between the federal government and Jubbaland. He served as a political adviser to two consecutive UN envoys to Somalia, Ambassador Nicholas Kay and Michael Keating.

== Wadajir Party ==
Following long consultations that took place inside and outside the country, Warsame formed the Wadajir Party and became its presidential candidate in the 2017 Somalia presidential election.

He was one of 20 candidates running for the country's presidency. After the election loss, Warsame did not leave the country like many of his fellow candidates, but remained in the country and continued to present his political philosophy and expanded the Wadajir Party. He gave numerous speeches and organised debates and seminars on state-building, democracy, as well on the shortcomings of the government, in accordance with the role of an opposition party.

== Attack on Wadajir Party headquarters ==
On 17 December 2017, the Somali National Intelligence and Security Agency attacked Warsame and other members of the Wadajir Party, killing five security members guarding the party headquarters and injuring four others, including Warsame.

President MB condemned the attack as it is againt the civil rights, human rights and freedom exprrssion.
