= PDRC =

PDRC may refer to:

- Passive daytime radiative cooling, a solar radiation management strategy to reverse global warming.
- People's Democratic Reform Committee, a political pressure group in the 2013–14 Thai political crisis.
- Puntland Development Research Center, a local non-governmental organization in Puntland, Somalia.
- PeriDynamics Research Centre, a research institution at the University of Strathclyde.
