= Hodan =

Name.list

- Gender: Female
- Language: Af-Somali

Origin
- Origin: Somali
- Meaning: paradise, heaven, prosperous, wealth
- Region of origin: Somalia

Other names
- Alternative spelling: Hoddon, Hoddan

Hodan (Somali: Hodan) is a name of Somali origin. It is a common given name for girls and women in Somalia and among the Somali diaspora. The name "Hodan" in Somali is often associated with the meaning "paradise" or "heaven." It carries positive connotations, symbolizing beauty and serenity. Names in Somali culture often have significant meanings, and "Hodan" reflects positive and aspirational qualities.

== Given name ==
- Hodan Ahmed, Somali political activist.
- Hodan Nalayeh, Somali-Canadian social activist and entrepreneur. (1976–2019).
- Hodan Hassan, Somali American politician.
- Hodan Said Isse, Somali American, UNFPA goodwill ambassador and First lady of Puntland.

== See also ==
- Hodan District
