= 2012 Somali presidential election =

- 10 September 2012
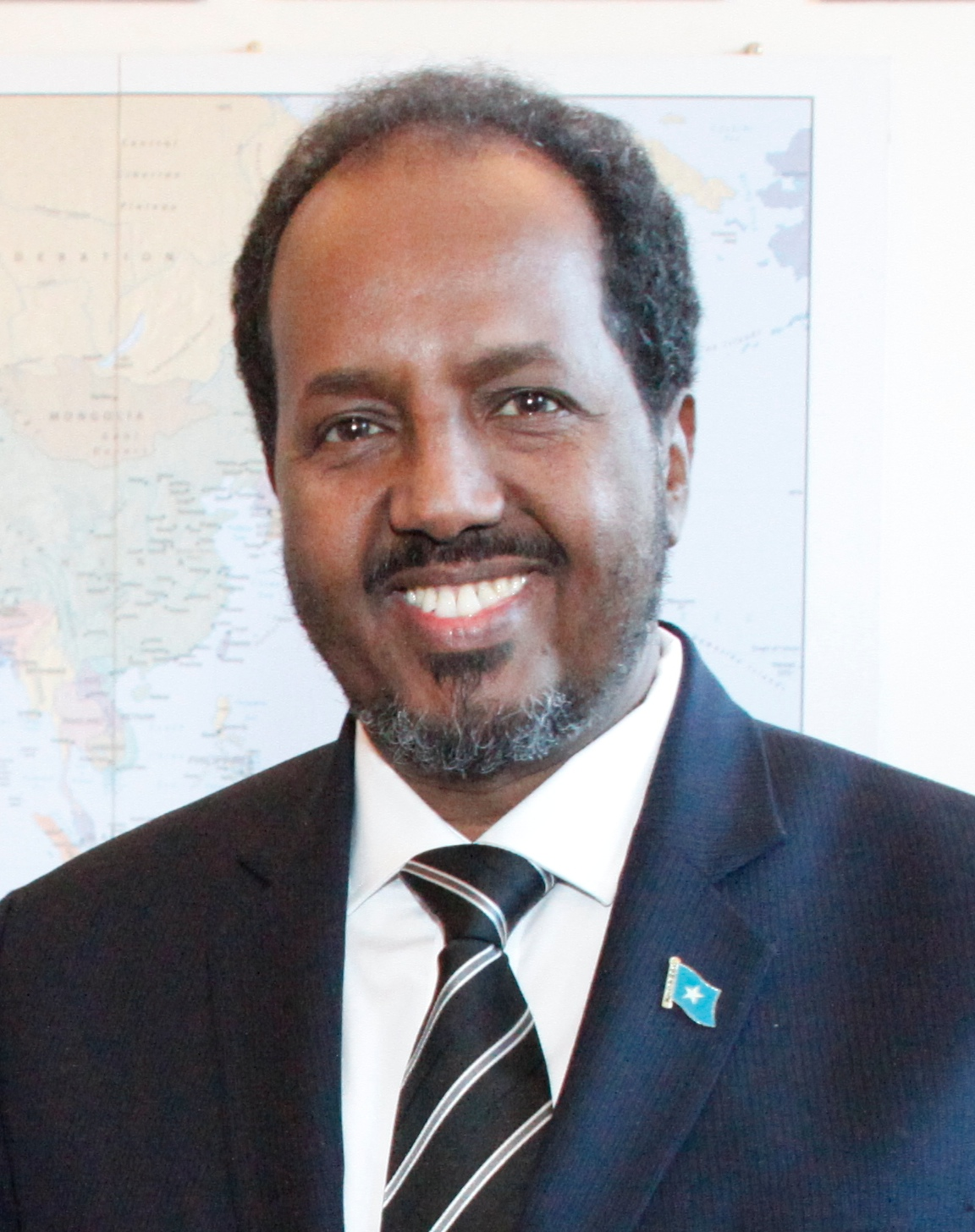

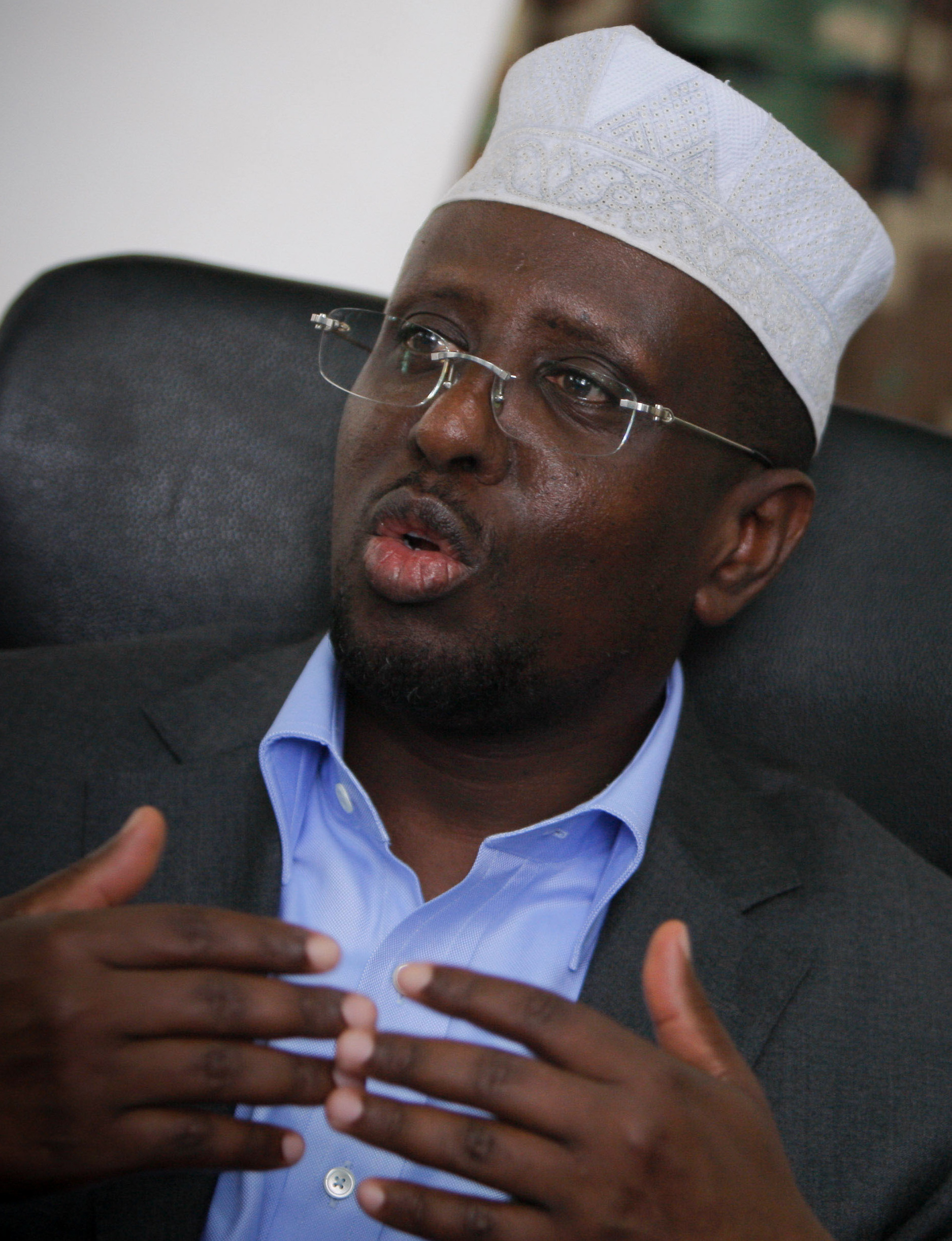
Nominee	Hassan Sheikh Mohamud	Sharif Sheikh Ahmed
Party	PDP	ARS
Electoral vote	190	79
Percentage	70.63%	29.37%
President before election
Mohamed Osman Jawari
(Acting)
Independent
Elected President
Hassan Sheikh Mohamud
PDP

Indirect presidential elections were held in Somalia on 10 September 2012. The newly appointed Federal Parliament elected Hassan Sheikh Mohamud as the first president of Somalia since the dissolution of the Transitional Federal Government (TFG). The election had previously been scheduled for 20 August, the same day that the mandate of the TFG expired, but was rescheduled for a later date.

== Background ==
Following the outbreak of the civil war in 1991 that saw the ouster of the Siad Barre-led government, many of the few remaining political parties gave way to autonomous or semi-autonomous regional states, or fragmented into feuding militia groups. After several unsuccessful national reconciliation efforts, a Transitional Federal Government (TFG) was formed in 2004 with a mandate leading toward the establishment of a new constitution and a transition to a representative government.

Though there has been no government that has controlled the entirety of the territory recognised as Somalia since the Somali Civil War, there have been democratic elections in Somaliland and Puntland. In the months prior to the election, Operation Linda Nchi, backed by AMISOM, the military of Kenya and the TFG, pushed back Al Shabaab from Mogadishu and other areas to take control of bigger parts of the country than the internationally recognised government previously had. During the process there have also been several counter-attacks and bombings, including the deaths of high-profile figures. The UN-brokered Kampala Accord also ended the eight-year TFG, thus necessitating a new election. Several members of the Somali diaspora have also since returned to the country. The twice-renewed mandate of the TFG expired on 20 August.

Unlike in previous years, the run-up to the election, which fell on Eid al-Adha, the capital, Mogadishu, was reportedly peaceful.

== Electoral system ==
As part of the official "Roadmap for the End of Transition", Somali government officials met in the northeastern town of Garowe in February 2012 to discuss post-transition arrangements. After extensive deliberations attended by regional actors and international observers, the conference ended in a signed agreement between TFG President Sharif Sheikh Ahmed, Prime Minister Abdiweli Mohamed Ali, Speaker of Parliament Sharif Adan Sharif Hassan, Puntland President Abdirahman Mohamed Farole, Galmudug President Mohamed Ahmed Alim and Ahlu Sunnah Wal Jama'a representative Khalif Abdulkadir Noor stipulating that: a new 225 member bicameral parliament would be formed, consisting of an upper house seating 54 senators as well as a lower house; the president is to be appointed through an election by appointed MPs; and the prime minister will then be selected by the president, who would, in turn, name a council of ministers.

On 23 June, TFG and regional leaders approved a draft constitution after several days of deliberation. The National Constituent Assembly overwhelmingly passed the new constitution on 1 August, with 96% of the 645 delegates present voting for it, 2% against it and 2% abstaining. To come into effect, it must be ratified by the new parliament.

A committee was formed to institute a new government and choose a president. The committee comprises 202 MP's and could have another 40 more representatives. On 18 August, committee co-chairperson Halimo Yarey said: "We have 202 members readied now and we are working on the reviewing of 40 others that were passed today and we hope the first parliament session will be held around [20 August]. The rest of the list is still pending because of inter-clan argument and other reasons related to a lack of fulfillment of the conditions."

The Technical Selection Committee is tasked with reviewing and approving a list of MPs from a list of nominations by a group of 135 traditional elders. On 17 August, the first 215 MPs were appointed, while about 70 nominees were rejected for failing the criteria to serve in parliament, which includes being Somali citizens of "sound mind," having a high school diploma and having no links to warlords or traces to "atrocities" during the civil war, as well as in accordance with the Galkayo and Garowe Principles accords. The TSC also based its screening procedure on detailed background information on the parliamentary candidates that was forwarded to it by the UN and African Union. The agreement also entails Somalia's four main clan families – the Darod, Dir, Hawiye and Rahanweyn – naming 30 members to the elders for nomination and 15 others suggested by a coalition of minority groups in what was called the four-and-a-half power sharing formula. Though it received praise as initiating some kind of permanent structures, it was also criticised as unfair with voting tied to clans and sub-clans in accordance with birth.

The new parliament would consist of 275 MPs in the lower house and an undecided number of upper house MPs capped at 54 representatives. They will be tasked with electing a new president, the speaker of parliament and two deputy speakers. The election had been scheduled to occur if a quorum of two-thirds of members (184 MPs) were present. Even though the total of 275 MPs were not achieved by the end of the TFG's mandate, the necessary quorum was achieved and a vote could have gone ahead as planned. As UN Special Representative Augustine Mahiga said that "this historic moment marks the long-awaited end of the transitional period in Somalia. The new MPs, selected after broad-based, grass roots consultations and representing all of Somalia's clans, have been successfully screened against objective criteria and are now ready to start their important work" and that the day marked the "legal end" of TFG, 222 of the MPs were sworn by the chief justice in at an airport base, which is located by the National Police Academy, which was secured by AMISOM troops. Pending the other 53 MPs the election will then be held by secret ballot. Defence Minister Hussein Arab Isse attributed the delay to a more thorough vetting process in order to avoid allegations of corruption and nepotism in order to avoid the scandals that dogged the TFG. He added that "most people that are coming into the parliament are highly educated and highly motivated."

Incumbent President Sharif Ahmed said of the committee that it "was given certain criteria to vet names presented to them. They don't have a right arbitrarily, to choose those on the list and who to reject. If there's a problem, members of the technical committee should go back to the council of elders, but it is unacceptable for them to overstep their mandate."

Somalia election took place behind schedule. The final number of hopefuls permitted to take part in the presidential race ultimately depends on which of the prospective candidates meets the presidential election commission's set of minimum prerequisites.

== Issues ==
Though this was the first election in decades to feature campaigning, some unnamed yet attributed as leading candidates said they were keeping a low profile due to the tenuous security situation. Further, the 30% representation for female MPs was frowned upon by the elder advisors who said it was too great a move in accordance with Somali culture. Despite lobbying by suffragettes, only 16% representations had been agreed upon.

== External influence ==
Prior to the election, a statement from the TFG's backers, including the African Union, the United Nations, the United States, the European Union and the Intergovernmental Authority on Development, read: "The conclusion of the Transition should mark the beginning of more representative government in Somalia. Whilst parliament remains a selected rather than elected body, it is essential that it cuts its ties with the past of self-interest and warlordism, and is populated by a new generation of Somali politicians, including the proper representation of Somali women."

Alexander Rondos, the European Union's special representative to the Horn of Africa, said from Mogadishu on 1 August: "We are in Mogadishu to show support because, finally, this is where the future of Somalia is being decided by Somalis. The international community welcomes the important progress that Somalia's leaders and people have made in getting to this stage."

== Conduct ==
Security was increased in Mogadishu on the day of the election with the visible sights of police and military patrols.

The chosen MPs rescheduled the election in order to complete the remaining MP selections. The Minister of Planning and International Cooperation Godah Barre stated that the election would be held in two weeks' time, with a definite date expected to be announced.

On 30 August 2012, the federal parliament convened and unanimously endorsed a new committee tasked with overseeing the presidential elections. At the parliamentary session chaired by the Speaker of Parliament Mohamed Osman Jawari, 15 MPs were named to the body, with former acting Speaker Muse Hassan Abdulle appointed as the commission's chairperson.

At a press conference on 1 September 2012, the electoral commission released a ten-point set of criteria against which all prospective candidates for president would be screened. Among the cited conditions were that presidential hopefuls should be at least 40 years of age, a Muslim, and have no criminal history. Candidates are also required to pay a $10,000 registration fee and must have secured at least 20 supporters in parliament prior to running for office. Voting was scheduled to take place on the 10th of the month.

== Results ==
Members of Parliament voted by marking their ballots behind a curtain and placing them in a clear box. It was broadcast live on television. After the first round of voting, former President Sharif Sheikh Ahmed emerged as the frontrunner, amassing 64 votes. Mohamud was a close second with 60 votes. Prime Minister Abdiweli Mohamed Ali placed third with 32 votes, but later dropped out ahead of the second round along with the fourth-place Abdulkadir Osoble Ali, even though both were eligible to stand in the second round. Mohamud went on to win the second round, defeating Sharif Ahmed by 190 votes to 79.

Candidate	First round		Second round	
Candidate	Votes	%	Votes	%
Hassan Sheikh Mohamud	60	22.22	190	70.63
Sharif Sheikh Ahmed	64	23.70	79	29.37
Abdiweli Mohamed Ali	30	11.11		
Abdulkadir Osoble Ali	27	10.00		
Abdullahi Ahmed Addow	24	8.89		
Abdirahman Baadiyow	21	7.78		
Mohamed Abdullahi Farmajo	14	5.19		
Ahmed Ismail Samatar	8	2.96		
Yusuf Garaad Omar	8	2.96		
Abdiwahid Elmi Gonjeh	3	1.11		
Mohamed Abdiweli Sheikh Yusuf	3	1.11		
Omar Salad Elmi	2	0.74		
Haji Mohamed Yasin Ismail	2	0.74		
Mohamed Abdullahi Omar	1	0.37		
Osman Mohamed Gaal	1	0.37		
Said Issa Mohamud	1	0.37		
Zakariye Mohamud Haji Abdi	1	0.37		
Mohamed Ahmed Salah	0	0.00		
Salad Ali Jelle	0	0.00		
Maslah Mohamed Siad Barre	0	0.00		
Ibrahim Ali Hussein	0	0.00		
Abdirahman Mohamed Abdi Hashi	0	0.00		
Total	270	100.00	269	100.00
Source: African Elections Database

== Reaction ==
=== Domestic ===
Somalia – Outgoing President Sharif Sheikh Ahmed conceded defeat and congratulated Hassan on his victory.

=== International ===
European Union – High Representative of the European Union Catherine Ashton phoned Hassan to congratulate him on his victory.

United Arab Emirates – President Sheikh Khalifa bin Zayed Al Nahyan of the United Arab Emirates (UAE) cabled a message of congratulations to Somalia's new head of state, as did the UAE's Vice President and Prime Minister Sheikh Mohammed bin Rashid Al Maktoum as well as the Crown Prince of Abu Dhabi Sheikh Mohammed bin Zayed Al Nahyan.

United Kingdom – British Prime Minister David Cameron congratulated Hassan on his victory. Stating that the elections were a "great step forward" for Somalia.

United States – White House Press Secretary Jay Carney congratulated Hassan on his victory as well as "the Somali people for completing this momentous political transition".
