= Abdullahi Haji Hassan Mohamed Nuur =

Abdullahi Haji Hassan Mohamed Nuur عبد الله حاجي حسن محمد نور

Foreign Minister of Somalia
- In office February 20, 2012 – November 4, 2012
- Prime Minister: Abdiweli Mohamed Ali
- Preceded by: Mohamed Abdullahi Omaar
- Succeeded by: Fowsiyo Yussuf Haji Aadan

Minister of Agriculture and Livestock
- In office August 2011 – February 20, 2012

Personal details
- Born: Somalia
- Party: Transitional Federal Government

Abdullahi Haji Hassan Mohamed Nuur (Somali: Cabdulaahi Xaaji Xasan Maxamed Nuur, Arabic: عبد الله حاجي حسن محمد نور) is a Somali politician. He served as Somalia's Minister of Agriculture and Livestock and later also as Foreign Minister.

== Overview ==
Nuur hails from the Leysan subdivision of the Rahaweyn (Mirifle) clan. Prior to his entry into Somali politics, he was living in London Ontario and part of the Somali diaspora in Canada. Later on in 2009 he moved to Edmonton Alberta.

In August 2011, Nuur was appointed as Somalia's new Minister of Agriculture and Livestock by then Prime Minister, Abdiweli Mohamed Ali.

Following a Cabinet reshuffle in February 2012, Nuur was given the Foreign Minister portfolio.
