= Deeq Sulaiman Yusuf =

Deeq Sulaiman Yusuf الديك سليمان يوسف

Director of the Presidential Palace of Puntland
- Vice President: Abdihakim Abdullahi Haji Omar

Personal details
- Born: Somalia
- Education: Brunel University; University of East London

Dr. Deeq Sulaiman Yusuf (Somali: Deeq Sulaymaan Yuusuf, Arabic: الديك سليمان يوسف) is a Somali politician. He is the Director of the Presidential Palace of the autonomous Puntland region in northeastern Somalia.

== Personal life ==
Yusuf hails from the northern Sool, Sanaag and Cayn (SSC) regions of Somalia.

For his post-secondary education, he earned a BA in Social Welfare from the Brunel University in London, graduating with honours. Yusuf also holds a Master's Degree in Social Work from the same institution, as well as another Master's Degree in Refugee Studies from the University of East London.

== Career ==
=== Early career ===
In a professional capacity, Yusuf has served as a senior social worker, senior substance misuse practitioner, and senior community development officer in the United Kingdom.

He has also worked at the Addis Ababa University's Institute of Peace and Security Studies. Yusuf likewise acted as a program Expert Consultant for Research on Somalia Restoration at the African Union's Department of Peace and Security.

Additionally, Yusuf served as a good governance consultant to the Somali central government during Abdiweli Mohamed Ali's term as Prime Minister of Somalia.

=== Director of the Presidential Palace ===
On 15 January 2014, newly elected President of Puntland Abdiweli Mohamed Ali appointed Yusuf as the region's new Director of the Presidential Palace.

== See also ==
- Abdihakim Abdullahi Haji Omar
