= Wadajir Party =

Somali political party

Wadajir Party Xisbiga Wadajir
- Leader: Abdirahman Abdishakur Warsame
- Chairperson: Saïd Muse Abdi
- Secretary-General: Abdifitah Ibrahim Gesey
- Founded: 10 June 2016
- Headquarters: Airport Road, Wadajir District Mogadishu
- Ideology: Progressivism; Social democracy
- Political position: Centre-left
- Colors: Orange; Blue
- Slogan: Self-reliance

Website
- wadajirparty.org/english/

The Wadajir Party (Somali: Xisbiga Wadajir, lit. 'Together Party', abbr. XW or WP; Arabic: حزب ودجر) is a social democratic political party in Somalia founded by a group of Somali politicians, intellectuals and social activists from different parts of the country, with a wide range of experience.

Abdirahman Abdishakur Warsame became Wadajir Party presidential candidate in the 2017 Somali presidential election.

== Foundation ==
Wadajir Party was launched in June 2016 by a group of politicians. The party was founded six of months before the 2017 Somali presidential election to reform political fiefdoms, nepotism, deadlock, and corruption. The party's leader Abdirahman Abdishakur announced his candidacy for Somali president in June unveiling his manifesto, Iskutashi, a vision premised on the transformation of Somalia into a prosperous, self-reliant economy.

Isku-Tashi or self-reliance, is a framework that strives to promote nation building and unity through serious policy agendas putting Somalia on a path to economic development and self-sustainability. Isku-Tashi framework consists of the following five overarching themes that are critical to Somali success:

- Political Stability and National cohesion
- Restructuring security Sector
- Revitalizing Somali’s Economy Sector
- Public Services, Accountability, Combating Corruption
- Regional stability and International Cooperation

== Attack on Wadajir Party headquarters ==
On 17 December 2017, the Somali National Intelligence and Security Agency attacked Warsame and other members of the Wadajir Party, killing five security members guarding the party headquarters and injuring four others, including Warsame.

Later, Warsame would say that he did not retaliate as many expected, with some of his supporters even urging him to do so. He said that he instead chose the supremacy of the law and compromised for the sake of national interest.

== Notable members of Wadajir Party ==
- Abdirahman Abdishakur Warsame is a leader of Wadajir Party and former minister of planning and international relations of Somalia.
- Kamal Dahir Gutale is a former chief of staff of Villa Somalia.
- Sayid Ali Moalim Abdulle is a former director of Port of Mogadishu.
- Abdifitah Ibrahim Gesey is a former minister of public works, reconstruction and housing of the Federal Government of Somalia.
- Abdiweli Aden Garyare is a veteran journalist.
- Shador Haji Mohamoud is a former director of communications of Villa Somalia.
- Saïd Muse Abdi is a political activist and businessman.
- Abdilatif Muse Nur (Sanyare) is a former member of Somali Federal Parliament.

== See also ==
- Political parties in Somalia
