= 1st Special Envoy for Drought and climate change of Somalia =

The Federal Republic of Somalia’s special presidential envoy for drought climate is a position in the Executive Office of the President of Somalia with authority over energy policy and climate policy within the executive branch. It is currently held by Abdirahman Abdishakur Warsame, who is the inaugural envoy.
