= Abdiweli Gaas =

Former president of Puntland and Prime Minister of Somalia

- Cabdiweli Maxamed Cali عبدالولي محمد علي
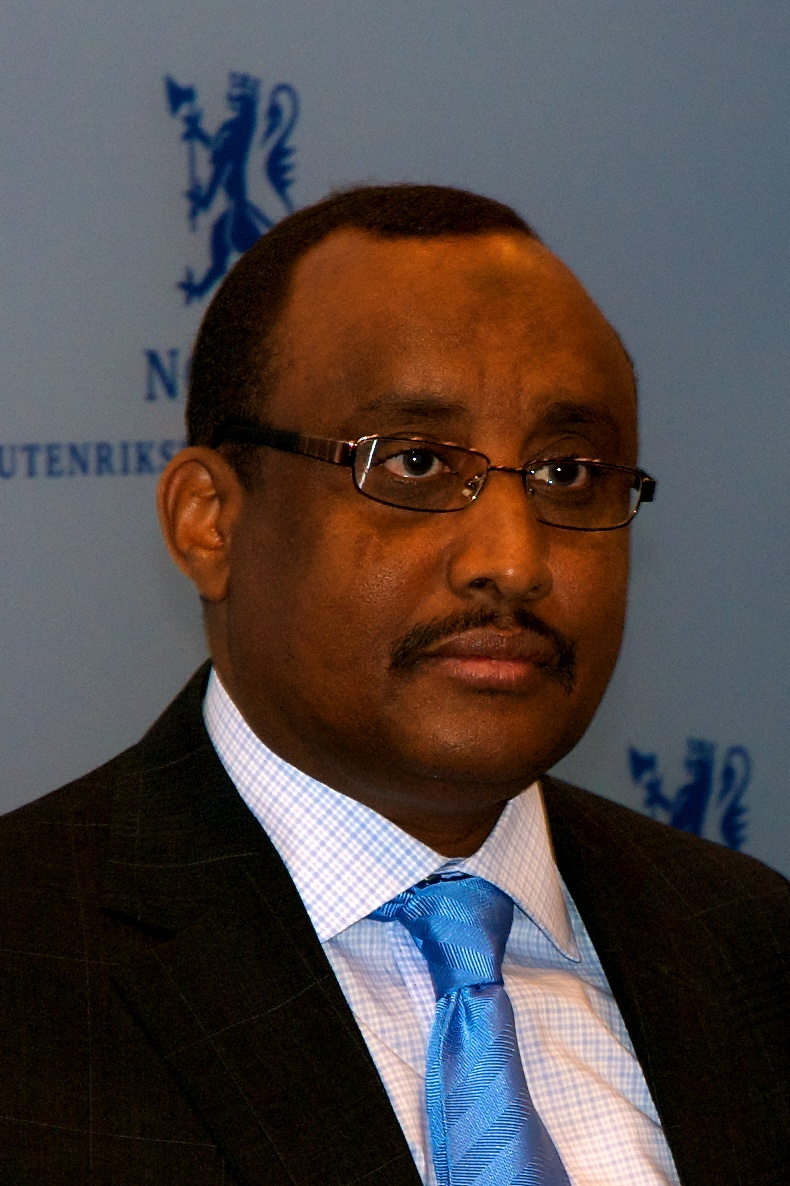
- Abdiweli Gaas in 2012.

5th President of the Puntland
- In office 8 January 2014 – 8 January 2019
- Vice President: Abdihakim Abdullahi Haji Omar
- Preceded by: Abdirahman Mohamud Farole
- Succeeded by: Said Deni

8th Prime Minister of Somalia
- In office 19 June 2011 – 17 October 2012
- President: Sharif Sheikh Ahmed; Muse Hassan Abdulle (Acting); Mohamed Osman Jawari (Acting); Hassan Sheikh Mohamud
- Preceded by: Mohamed Abdullahi Mohamed
- Succeeded by: Abdi Farah Shirdon

Personal details
- Born: 2 July 1967 (age 59) Dhusamareb, Galgadud, Somali Republic
- Party: Ururka Dadka Puntland
- Spouse: Hodan Said Isse
- Education: Somali National University; Vanderbilt University; Harvard University; George Mason University
- Website: Official website

Abdiweli Mohamed Ali Gaas (Somali: Cabdiweli Maxamad Cali Gaas pronounced [ʕabdiweli maħamad ʕali gaːs]; Arabic: عبدالولي محمد علي گاس; English pronunciation), also more known as Abdiweli Gaas, is a Somali American economist and politician. He served as the Prime Minister of Somalia from June 2011 to October 2012, and briefly afterwards as an MP in the newly formed Federal Parliament. During his time as premier, Ali is credited with having devised the formal "Roadmap for the End of Transition", a political process that provided clear benchmarks leading toward the establishment of permanent democratic institutions in the country. On 8 January 2014, he was elected the 5th President of the Puntland.

During his tenure as the state's President, Abdiweli Mohamed Ali Gaas launched a new biometric fishery database, strengthened bilateral cooperation with the European Union in the security and development sectors, initiated taxation reform with regard to international organizations working in Puntland, established a new mutual consulate agreement with Yemen, finalized a five-year development plan for Puntland, strengthened bilateral cooperation with the United Arab Emirates and Australia, launched new road, airport and seaport development initiatives in Bosaso and other local areas in conjunction with Djibouti, China and UNHABITAT officials, and successfully concluded the Galgala campaign against the Al-Shabaab militant group. He also signed a 12-point bilateral agreement in Garowe with Prime Minister of Somalia Abdiweli Sheikh Ahmed, which officially reaffirms Puntland's boundaries, agrees to form a united and inclusive national army, and establishes parliamentary committees consisting of Federal and Puntland representatives to ensure equitable allocation of resources and oversee eventual Provisional Constitution talks. Additionally, Ali led Puntland delegations at global business and development conferences in Ethiopia and the United Kingdom, with the goal of highlighting the regional state's commercial potential, establishing business partnerships, and securing funding and mega development projects in the energy, agricultural and security sectors. He also established a governmental committee to formulate an official money remittance policy for the Puntland regional state.

== Background ==
=== Personal life ===
Gaas is originally from Puntland state in northeastern Somalia. He holds both Somali and American citizenship. He is multilingual, being fluent in Somali, Arabic, Italian and English.

Gaas is married to Hodan Isse, founder of HEAL, and university professor. The couple have four children.

=== Education ===
Gaas initially studied in Mogadishu, Somalia's capital. Here he earned a BA degree summa cum laude in Economics from the Somali National University in 1984. Gaas later moved to the United States for his post-graduate studies, and in 1988, he obtained an MA degree in Economics from Vanderbilt University as an AFGRAD Fellow. He then was a Bradley Fellow at George Mason University, first in the Department of Economics between 1994 and 1995, then at the Center for Study of Public Choice between 1995 and 1998. He also conducted his doctoral research at this university where obtained his PhD degree in economics in 2000. Besides this, in 1999, he furthermore obtained an MA degree in Public Administration from Harvard Kennedy School and a Certificate in Taxation from Harvard Law School.

=== Career ===
==== General ====
In a professional capacity, Gaas served as a Director in the Excise Tax Department of Somalia's federal Ministry of Finance and Revenue in the mid- to late 1980s. Between 1988 and 1991, he was an Assistant Director in Research and Statistics at the Ministry of Finance and Revenue.

He later moved to Niagara County in New York state, where he was an Associate Professor of Economics in the Department of Commerce of Niagara University, having joined the school in 2003.

His main academic areas of concentration have been in public finance, public choice and international trade. Gaas' current research endeavors center around the impact that institutions have on economic growth.

Gaas has written articles for many peer-reviewed journals, including the Journal of Business and Economics Research, International Advances in Economic Research, and the Journal of Public Choice. In 2001, his paper titled "Political stability, stable economic policies and growth: An empirical investigation" that was published in the Atlantic Economic Journal was given the year's Best Article Award.

==== Transitional Federal Government ====
On 12 June 2010, Gaas was appointed the Transitional Federal Government of Somalia's Minister of Planning and International Cooperation as well as one of several deputy prime ministers. Selected for the position by the former premier Mohamed Abdullahi Mohamed, he served as an integral part of a technocratic Cabinet.

== Prime Minister of Somalia ==
=== Appointment ===
On 19 June 2011, Gaas was appointed the Acting Premier of Somalia after Prime Minister Mohamed abruptly resigned from office as part of a controversial agreement signed in Kampala between the President and the Parliament Speaker. A few days later, on 23 June 2011, Gaas was named permanent prime minister.

Lawmakers welcomed Gaas' nomination and reaffirmed their opposition to and intention of repealing the Kampala Accord.

In a session held on 28 June 2011, Members of Parliament overwhelmingly approved Ali's appointment as prime minister. 337 of the MPs endorsed the selection, while 2 voted against it and 2 abstained.

On 23 July 2011, Parliament unanimously endorsed Prime Minister Gaas' selection of new Cabinet officials. The ministerial posts were expanded to include an additional 9 state ministers and 26 deputy ministers, bringing a total of 53 federal ministers.

=== 2011 drought ===
On 4 July 2011, in one of his first policy initiatives, Gaas appointed a national committee to tackle the severe drought that was then affecting large parts of the country and the larger East Africa region. The committee consisted of several federal-level members of government, including the Ministers of Defense, Health, Interior, Finance, Public Works, Women's Affairs and Information. It was tasked with assessing and addressing the needs of the drought-impacted segments of the population.

=== Special Force ===
In August 2011, Prime Minister Gaas announced the creation of a new Special Force (SP) division of the Somali National Army (SNA). Consisting of 300 trained soldiers, the unit was initially mandated with protecting relief shipments and distribution centers in Mogadishu. Besides helping to stabilize the city, the new protection force was also tasked with combating banditry and other vices.

=== Linda Nchi ===
In October 2011, a coordinated operation between the Somali military and the Kenyan military referred to as Linda Nchi began, with Kenyan troops crossing the border into southern Somalia in pursuit of Al-Shabaab militants that are alleged to have kidnapped several foreign tourists and workers inside Kenya. Prime Minister Ali along with President of Somalia Sharif Ahmed initially opposed the deployment of Kenyan troops into the country, as they felt it was a breach of an earlier joint defence pact reached with the Kenyan government that limited Kenya's support to logistical activities. On 31 October, a Somali delegation led by Prime Minister Ali met in Nairobi with the Kenyan Premier Raila Odinga and other government officials to iron out differences and to outline a joint strategy vis-a-vis Operation Linda Nchi. After lengthy talks, the delegations issued a joint communique pledging coordinated military, political and diplomatic support for the mission, requesting that AMISOM peacekeepers police areas captured from Al-Shabaab, and that the International Criminal Court (ICC) begin formal investigations against the group's commanders. In addition, Prime Minister Gaas urged the international community to support the joint operation, and stated that the mission "would be led by Somali forces with support of Kenyan forces". The two delegations also formed a joint high-level co-ordinating committee to maintain regular contacts between their respective governments.

In early June 2012, Kenyan forces were formally integrated into AMISOM. Analysts expect the additional AU troop reinforcements to help the Somali authorities gradually expand their territorial control.

=== Marine forces ===
On 7 August 2012, Prime Minister Gaas announced that his government was set to re-establish the Somali Navy, which had disbanded shortly after the outbreak of the civil war in the early 1990s. Speaking to reporters in the capital, the Premier indicated that his administration wanted to create a well-trained national marine force capable of efficiently patrolling Somalia's territorial waters and putting an end to the illegal plunder of the country's resources by foreign companies and nations. He also indicated that he had asked the international community to support the Somali government's extant efforts aimed at developing its maritime defensive capacity, including the possibility of acquiring speed boats and warships to more effectively secure the country's extensive seaboard.

=== Post-transition Roadmap ===
Prime Minister Gaas has been credited with devising the formal "Roadmap for the End of Transition", a political process that provided clear benchmarks leading toward the establishment of permanent democratic institutions in Somalia by mid-2012, when the Transitional Federal Government's mandate expired.

In February 2012, the Premier and other Somali government officials met in the northeastern town of Garowe to discuss post-transition political arrangements. After extensive deliberations attended by regional actors and international observers, the conference ended in a signed agreement between Prime Minister Gaas, TFG President Sharif Sheikh Ahmed, Speaker of Parliament Sharif Hassan Sheikh Aden, Puntland President Abdirahman Mohamud Farole, Galmudug President Mohamed Ahmed Alim and Ahlu Sunna Waljama'a representative Khalif Abdulkadir Noor stipulating that: a) a new 225 member bicameral parliament would be formed, with a lower house and an upper house seating 54 Senators; b) 30% of the National Constituent Assembly (NCA) is earmarked for women; c) the President is to be appointed via a constitutional election; and d) the Prime Minister is selected by the President and he/she then names his/her Cabinet.

On 23 June 2012, the Somali federal and regional leaders met again and approved a draft constitution after several days of deliberation. The National Constituent Assembly overwhelmingly passed the new constitution on 1 August, with 96% voting for it, 2% against it, and 2% abstaining.

=== 2012 presidential elections ===
In early August 2012, Prime Minister Gaas officially announced his intention to present himself as a presidential candidate in Somalia's 2012 elections. Speaking before a gathering of hundreds of supporters in Mogadishu, Gaas highlighted his administration's various achievements during its brief tenure, saying that "if you appreciate all the hard work and the national obligations done by my government then you will be giving me your votes."

v was among the four contestants who made it to the second round of voting. However, he and another candidate subsequently dropped out, leaving former TFG president Sharif Sheikh Ahmed to contest the presidency with the eventual winner, Hassan Sheikh Mohamud.

=== End of term ===
Gaas' term as Prime Minister of Somalia ended on 6 October 2012, when newly elected President Mohamud appointed entrepreneur and economist Abdi Farah Shirdon to the office.

== Federal Parliament ==
Following the establishment of the Federal Parliament of Somalia in August 2012, Gaas briefly served as an MP in the new legislature. He represented Galkayo constituency.

== President of Puntland ==
=== Election ===
In August 2013, Gaas launched a campaign to run for President of the autonomous Puntland state in the northeastern region's 2014 elections. After meeting with Puntland leaders in the UAE, opposition groups agreed that he would make a viable compromise candidate. He later arrived in Puntland to confer with political and clan leaders in Galkayo and Qardho so as to strengthen ties with the opposition and secure new supporters. On 8 January 2014, the first and second rounds of voting saw 9 of the 11 presidential contenders eliminated from the running, with Gaas and incumbent Puntland President Abdirahman Mohamud Farole left to face off in the third round. Farole initially led the final round with 31 votes, with Ali receiving 18 votes. However, a late rally by Gaas saw him eventually win the election, narrowly defeating Farole by 33 votes to 32. The victory officially makes Gaas the 5th President of Puntland.

In his acceptance speech, Gaas expressed gratitude for the opportunity as well as the work of the Farole administration. He also pledged to defend and adhere to the Puntland Constitution, and called for collaboration in the development and security sectors. For his part, Farole indicated that he accepted the outcome of the election, and felicitated Ali on his victory. Farole also reminded Gaas of the responsibility now bestowed upon him as leader, urging the new President-elect to prioritize Puntland's interests and calling on all government officials, workers and security forces to cooperate with the region's new leadership.

On 14 January 2014, former Puntland President Farole officially handed over power to his successor Gaas. The transfer ceremony was held at the Puntland State House in Garowe, with incumbent Puntland Vice President Abdihakim Abdullahi Haji Omar, former Puntland Vice President Abdisamad Ali Shire, outgoing and erstwhile Puntland cabinet ministers, the Ethiopian consul-general in the region, UNSOM officials and other international representatives in attendance. During his hand over speech, Farole recapped the accomplishments of his administration, and noted a number of infrastructural development projects in the region that were scheduled for implementation. He also thanked all members of government for having worked for the greater communal good, and pledged to assist the incoming leadership with any advice and consultations should it require them. President Gaas in turn thanked the outgoing Puntland administration for its achievements, and vowed to continue and build on them. Wishing Farole well in his future endeavors, Ali also noted that his administration would benefit going forward from Farole's advice and support as a statesman.

=== Inauguration ===
On 25 January 2014, Puntland President Gaas and Vice President Abdihakim Abdullahi Haji Omar were officially inaugurated into office at a ceremony at the state capital Garowe. The event was attended by a number of dignitaries, including former Puntland Presidents Abdirahman Mohamed Farole and Mohamud Muse Hersi, Jubaland President Ahmed Mohamed Islam (Madobe), Galmudug President Abdi Hasan Awale Qeybdiid, former prime minister of Somalia Ali Mohammed Ghedi, federal MPs, ambassadors from Djibouti, Ethiopia and Turkey, UN Special Representative for Somalia Nicholas Kay, members of the Somali expatriate community and Puntland public, and US, AU and IGAD representatives. In his inaugural speech, Gaas outlined his intention to prioritize the security sector in order to create an environment conducive for investment. He also indicated that his administration would facilitate commercial development and trade by renovating and growing the region's existing transport infrastructure, and would seek to tap into Puntland's natural resources through inclusive cooperation. Additionally, Gaas pledged to deliver social services in the areas of free education, health and women's development, and highlighted the importance of strengthening relations with the federal government. He likewise gave a 100-day window for the unity conference for Puntland's various constituencies, vowing to revive the "spirit of 1998" when Puntland state was established.

=== Cabinet ===
On 15 January 2014, Gaas appointed Deeq Sulaiman Yusuf as the new Director of the Presidential Palace of Puntland. Yusuf previously served as a good governance consultant to the Somali central government during Gaas' term as Prime Minister of Somalia.

Gaas concurrently held his first press conference as Puntland President, during which he announced that he was in the process of forming a lean cabinet. He indicated that he would consult with the electorate before unveiling the new council of ministers. Gaas also pledged to include more women in the incoming cabinet, and vowed to strengthen the security sector. Additionally, he asked for input and cooperation from the general public.

On 15 January 2014, President Gaas engaged in a question and answer session with over 100 members of the public at the Puntland Development Research Center (PDRC) in Garowe. The event included politicians, former cabinet ministers, members of the diaspora, and women and youth. During his 20-minute speech, Gaas touched on his development plan for the region, which he indicated would focus on institution building, good governance, security, justice, economy and reconciliation. While commending previous Puntland governments for having established an effective state security structure, he wavered to further strengthen the sector by ensuring that all regional security processes were government-led. Gaas also indicated that he intended to tap into existing institutional capacity building initiatives and opportunities, including sending government staff abroad for special skills training. Additionally, Gaas pledged to prioritize administrative transparency, as well as launch social campaigns on justice. With regard to the commercial sector, Gaas noted the importance of tax revenue, reminding the local business community to fulfill its tax obligations. He also indicated that effective policies were scheduled for the payment of civil service salaries. Gaas likewise announced that he would hold a reconciliation conference for Puntland's various constituencies, describing the initiative as the first step in his administration's action plan and a priority for his government.

On 27 January 2014, ahead of the announcement of a new Cabinet, President Gaas hosted a luncheon for Members of the Puntland Parliament at the state capital Garowe. The meeting was held at the national assembly building and was also attended by Puntland Vice President Abdihakim Abdullahi Haji Omar and Parliament Speaker Said Hassan Shire. President Gaas briefed the gathered legislators about his government program, reiterating his focus on commercial development, security, reconciliation and institutional capacity building.

On 28 January 2014, the Chief of Cabinet at the Presidential office, Deeq Suleiman Yusuf, announced President Gaas' new Council of Ministers at a press conference at the Puntland State House in Garowe. The new ministerial line-up consisted of 47 officials, including returning politicians, opposition figures, diaspora members and business leaders. Two former Presidents of the Khatumo State administration, Ahmed Elmi Osman "Karaash" and Abdinuur Biindhe, were named Puntland Minister of Interior and Minister of Fisheries, respectively. Ali Haji Warsame and Shire Haji Farah, two candidates who had participated in the just concluded Puntland presidential elections, were also appointed to the Cabinet, with Warsame assigned the Ministry of Education portfolio and Farah the Ministry of Finance office. The erstwhile Chairman of the Midnimo political association, Saadiq Enow, was in turn named Minister of Health. Additionally, Hassan Osman Mohamud Aloore, the former Minister of Petroleum under the Hersi administration, was given the Ministry of Security portfolio. The new Minister of Women, Anisa Abdulkadir Haji Mumin, and Minister of Constitution, Sahra Saed Nour, were likewise among five women in the new Cabinet, which included three other female Deputy ministers.

On 29 January 2014, Puntland's new Cabinet held its first meeting at the State House in Garowe. The Council of Ministers was officially sworn into office at the same venue on 1 February. The swearing-in function was attended by a number of public figures from the state, including the Vice President, Parliament Speaker, chairman of the Supreme Court and Islamic scholars. On 4 February 2014, Puntland lawmakers approved the new state Cabinet during a session at the parliament hall in Garowe. Moments before the vote of confidence took place, President Gaas briefed the present legislators on his government's plans and priorities. All 55 MPs present in the 66-seat chamber subsequently voted in favor of the new Council of Ministers. Gaas thanked the parliament for the endorsement, and reiterated his administration's commitment to good governance.

=== Puntland biometric fishery database ===
On 27 March 2014, Puntland President Gaas in conjunction with representatives from the EU and FAO officially launched a new database for registering local fishermen. Referred to as the Fishermen Identification Database System, it is a $400,000 project financed by a Trust Fund from seven EU Member States. The database will provide fishermen in the region with a unique identification card. It uses biometric data, which can differentiate between the identities of individuals. Registering fishermen will allow the Puntland government to identify who fishes in its waters, and to ensure efficacious management of fisheries and sustainable resource use through the gathering of vital data. President Gaas indicated that the system is also expected to help the authorities more easily distinguish legitimate fishermen from possible pirate suspects. In addition, FAO representative to Somalia Luca Alinovi noted that the database will enable fishermen to work in a secure environment. According to the New York Anti-Piracy Trust Fund, more than 3,100 fishermen already registered in the new biometric database over the previous 12 months.

=== EU bilateral cooperation ===
In March 2014, President Gaas discussed bilateral cooperation with a European Union delegation led by EU Envoy to Somalia Michele Cervone d'Urso. The meeting concluded with an agreement by the EU officials to assist the new Puntland administration in strengthening its security sector. Additionally, the representatives indicated that the EU would start allocating directly to Puntland its share of development funds earmarked for Somalia.

In October 2014, Gaas met again with EU Special Envoy Cervone d'Urso at the Puntland State House in Garowe. The officials discussed various EU-financed development initiatives that are underway in Puntland, including education, health care and environmental protection projects. They also touched on the ongoing federalization and national reconciliation talks in Somalia, maritime and regional security, and the Puntland forces' victory over Al-Shabaab insurgents during the Galgala campaign. Additionally, the delegations discussed the New Deal conference in Copenhagen slated to take place in November 2014.

=== PMPF training ===
On 27 March 2014, a Puntland government delegation including President Gaas and cabinet ministers met with EU representatives aboard a NATO ship. The meeting concluded with an announcement by the European Union officials that the EU would begin training Puntland Maritime Police Force units in Djibouti. The new training schedule is intended to help the Puntland authorities strengthen their marine defense capabilities in keeping with the New Deal Compact's Somali Maritime and Resources Strategy. President Gaas welcomed the initiative, noting that marine cooperation with national and international stakeholders would impact activities on both sea and land, including coastal development projects.

On 28 March 2014, Gaas met in Bosaso with the UAE Ambassador to Somalia Mohamed Al Osmani to discuss bilateral relations. Al Osmani asserted that his government would continue supporting progress by Puntland's new leadership. A Puntland presidential office representative also indicated that both parties had reached an agreement stipulating that the UAE government would continue supporting the Puntland Maritime Police Force. The Emirati authorities have funded the PMPF's official training program since the force's formation in 2010.

=== Puntland tax reform ===
In April 2014, the Puntland Ministry of Finance announced that the Puntland government would start taxation of UN and international organizations working in the regional state. According to the head of the Nugal tax department Abdiwahab Farah Ali, this is the first such initiative undertaken in Puntland, and is expected to raise available revenue for local development projects by the new Puntland authorities. The decision is part of a pledge by Puntland President Abdiweli Mohamed Ali to increase the government's development funding in part through higher taxation. Toward this end, the Puntland authorities already increased taxes on commercial firms operating in the state in order to meet regional financing benchmarks.

=== Puntland-Yemen bilateral cooperation ===
In May 2014, Puntland President Gaas made an official visit to Yemen to discuss bilateral cooperation between the Puntland and Yemeni governments with President of Yemen Abd Rabbuh Mansur Hadi. The meeting was held at the presidential palace in Sana'a, and was also attended by a number of ministers from the Puntland regional administration. The delegations touched on bilateral trade, economic investments, security and international issues. According to the Presidential Office, the gathering concluded with an agreement by the Puntland authorities to open a consulate in Sana'a, with the Yemeni government likewise agreeing to open its own consulate in the Puntland region.

=== Puntland five-year development plan ===
On 21 May 2014, Gaas chaired a one-day roundtable meeting on the Puntland regional state's development priorities and targets at the Puntland Development Research Center (PDRC) in Garowe. The gathering was attended by officials from various national and international bodies as well as key partners, including representatives from the Somali Federal Government, Turkey, Sweden, World Bank, United Nations, European Union, African Union and IGAD. Gaas opened the conference with a briefing of his administration's development goals for the next five years, which would be centered on economic growth, health, education and security. Ambassador Mahamet Saleh Annadif, the Special Representative of the Chairperson of the African Union Commission (SRCC) for Somalia, also commended Puntland on its democratization process and emphasized the importance of the region's stability as well as its position as a role model for other federal states in Somalia. The roundtable meeting concluded with a joint press conference including EU Envoy to Somalia Ambassador Michele Cervone D'urso, during which President Gaas announced that the international representatives had agreed to support the Puntland administration's five-year development plan. Between 27–29 December 2014, Gaas, Puntland cabinet members, director generals, heads of agencies and departments, and senior government officials held a follow-up three-day retreat in Garowe to review the 2014 Government Action Plan. The interactive event was the first of its kind in Somalia, and was broadcast live on local media. It focused on transparently assessing progress on the Puntland administration's pledges, identifying challenges, setting priorities for 2015, and developing strategies to ameliorate performance and speed up service delivery.

=== Puntland-UAE bilateral cooperation ===
In August 2014, Gaas met with a United Arab Emirates delegation at the Puntland Maritime Police Force base on the outskirts of Bosaso, including UAE Ambassador to Somalia Mohamed Al-Othman and senior heads of the Dubai Port Wall (DP). The representatives discussed a number of bilateral issues such as the ongoing renovations and expansion of the Port of Bosaso and maritime security. Additionally, the officials touched on investments in Puntland's constituent provinces, which the UAE government pledged it would make.

=== Transport development ===
In June 2014, Puntland President Gaas along with Bosaso Mayor Hassan Abdallah Hassan and other Puntland state officials inaugurated a new 5.9 km paved road in Bosaso. The construction project leads to the Port of Bosaso, and was completed in conjunction with UNHABITAT. According to Gaas, his administration plans to invest at least 23 million Euros in contributions from international partners in similar road infrastructure development initiatives.

In August 2014, Puntland Transport and Seaports Minister Abdullahi Jama Salah announced ongoing efforts by the Puntland government under President Gaas to establish new seaports in the region. The initiative is part of a campaign pledge by Gaas to focus on tapping into Puntland's commercial potential through various development projects. According to Salah, he met in Djibouti with representatives from an international construction firm headquartered in China, who are scheduled to soon conduct a project evaluation for a new international seaport in Puntland. The government of Djibouti will provide facilitation during the assessment. Other transportation projects in Puntland that are concurrently in development include the construction of an international airport in the commercial hub of Bosaso.

In November 2014, Gaas also conferred with UNHABITAT Head of Office for Somalia Dragan Tatic on the completion of roads and houses in Bosaso, as well as water development projects in the region.

In December 2014, Gaas laid the foundation stone for a new runway at the Bender Qassim International Airport in Bosaso. The inauguration event was attended by cabinet ministers, legislators, traditional leaders, and various international officials, including tender winner China Civil Engineering Construction Corporation, financial partner and Ambassador of Italy to Somalia Farbizio Marcelli, and United Nations Office for Project Services representatives. Gaas described the initiative as a flagship project aimed at advancing the local aviation sector. Ambassador Marcelli similarly hailed the development, which was originally launched in 2013 under the incumbency of erstwhile Puntland President Abdirahman Mohamed Farole. The China Civil Engineering Construction Corporation is now slated to upgrade the airport's existing gravel runway, pave it with asphalt, and convert it from 1.8 km to 2.65 km in accordance with the code 4C operations clause.

In March 2015, Gaas in conjunction with EU Ambassador to Somalia Michele Cervone d'Urso and German Ambassador to Somalia Andreas Peschke launched the Sustainable Road Maintenance Project. Part of the New Deal Compact for Somalia, the initiative's implementation is facilitated by 17.75 million Euros and 3 million Euros provided by the EU and Deutsche Gesellschaft für Internationale Zusammenarbeit (GIZ), respectively. Among other objectives, the project aims to renovate the highway between Galkayo and Garowe, including funding refurbishments on the damaged segments of the road and construction of check dams and flood control structures. The initiative also involves a routine annual maintenance program, which focuses on side brushing, clearing bridges after floods, drainage and culvert clearance, and pothole filling. Additionally, the project will offer policy support to the Puntland Ministry of Public Works and the Puntland Highway Authority, and local contractors will receive on-the-job training to upgrade their skills.

=== Galgala campaign ===
In October 2014, the Puntland Security Force launched a cleanup operation against Al-Shabaab militants in the Galgala area in the northern Golis mountain range. The heavily armed soldiers reportedly captured an unspecified number of militants as part of the final phase of the Galgala campaign. After seizing the Galgala mountain area, Puntland President Gaas offered a 30-day amnesty period to all Al-Shabaab members to turn themselves in to the regional authorities. Security officials later indicated that at least 50 U.S. military personnel had participated in the Galgala attack. This was the first reported ground support in Somalia by U.S. troops since 2006. While Bari provincial Governor Abdisamad Mohamed Galan was visiting the frontlines, U.S. special forces in armoured fighting vehicles were seen in the Galgala area. The foreign military personnel were reportedly gathering intelligence ahead of the raid on the Puntland forces' behalf. They also helped Puntland army units dismantle improvised explosive devices and conducted tactical surveillance.

=== Garowe bilateral agreement ===
In October 2014, Prime Minister of Somalia Abdiweli Sheikh Ahmed led a federal government delegation to the autonomous state of Puntland. The delegates included Second Speaker of the Federal Parliament Mahad Abdalle Awad and Minister of Education Ahmed Mohamed Gurase, among other Cabinet members. They were received at the Garowe International Airport by senior Puntland leaders, including President Gaas and Vice President Abdihakim Abdullahi Haji Omar, and subsequently attended a well-organized welcoming ceremony at the Puntland presidential palace in Garowe alongside various members of the international community. Ahmed subsequently co-chaired a reconciliation conference in the city between the visiting federal officials and Puntland representatives led by President Gaas.

The three-day meeting concluded with a 12-point agreement between the stakeholders, with UN envoy to Somalia Ambassador Nicholas Kay, EU Ambassador Michele Cervone d'Urso, IGAD representative Mohamed Abdi Afey, and Ethiopian Consul General Asmalash Woldamirat serving as witnesses. According to federal Minister of Culture and Higher Education Duale Adan Mohamed, the pact stipulates that the recent tripartite agreement between Galmudug and Himan and Heeb establishing a new central regional state within Somalia only applies to the Galguduud and south Mudug provinces. In keeping with a 2013 pact signed by former prime minister of Somalia Abdi Farah Shirdon and former Puntland President Abdirahman Mohamed Farole, the Garowe bilateral agreement also states that the Federal and Puntland authorities will work together to form a united and inclusive national army. Additionally, parliamentary committees consisting of Federal and Puntland representatives are mandated with ensuring equitable distribution of foreign assistance and overseeing eventual talks pertaining to the Provisional Constitution. Ambassador Kay welcomed the agreement and urged both parties to work for the public interest, and IGAD representative Afey likewise hailed the reconciliation effort.

=== Global African Investment Summit ===
In October 2014, Gaas led a Puntland delegation to participate in the Global African Investment Summit in London. The Puntland authorities had reportedly been invited to take part in the international conference. The summit is slated to be attended by various global leaders, and is aimed at highlighting investment opportunities. Its focus is on establishing business partnerships, and securing funding and mega development projects in the energy and agricultural sectors. To this end, Gaas indicated that his administration welcomed foreign investment in Puntland given the regional state's position as a local commercial center.

=== EUCAP Nestor ===
In January 2015, President Gaas met with the EU head of Civilian Operations Commander for all Civilian Common Security Defence Policy (CSDP) Missions Kenneth Deane in Garowe. During the gathering, the establishment of a new EUCAP Nestor base in Puntland was discussed. The European Union's Maritime Capacity Building Mission in the Horn of Africa and Western Indian Ocean (EUCAP Nestor) is mandated to assist nations in the latter regions to strengthen their maritime security capabilities. As such, the new base aims to advance cooperation, to train Puntland forces in maritime security and to develop and firm up on existent maritime security instruments and legislation.

=== Money remittance policy ===
In March 2015, Gaas established a government committee to formulate an official money remittance policy for the State Bank of Puntland. Puntland Minister of Interior Ahmed Elmi Osman serves as the Chairman of the new panel. The committee is composed of Puntland cabinet members.

=== Garowe Q&A session ===
In March 2015, Gaas participated in a public question and answer session held at the East Africa University's Garowe branch. State ministers, legislators, civil society representatives and students were also in attendance. The event was organized by the Puntland government to give the public an opportunity to ask the President questions, and to receive in return answers vis-a-vis their queries. Gaas opened the session with a short speech on ongoing development projects that his administration is implementing in the regional state. It was followed by open questions from the general public. The meeting is among the first such public question and answer sessions chaired by a political leader in Somalia.

=== Puntland-Australia bilateral cooperation ===
In April 2015, Gaas met with the Ambassador of Australia to Somalia, John Feakes, at his office in Garowe. The officials discussed Australian developmental initiatives in Puntland and the local security sector, among various other bilateral matters. According to Gaas, the Australian government announced that it was slated to launch new development projects in the regional state. Feakes in turn specified that these multiple initiatives would be centered on infrastructure and social services.

=== Federal-Puntland forum ===
In April 2015, Puntland President Gaas and Prime Minister of Somalia Omar Abdirashid Ali Sharmarke launched a consultative forum between Puntland and the Federal Government at the regional state's administrative capital, Garowe. Various federal and Puntland delegates were in attendance at the gathering, including Federal Minister of Planning and international cooperation Abdirahman Yusuf Hussein Aynte, Puntland Minister of Education Ali Haji Warsame and Puntland Minister of Information Abdiweli Hersi Indhoguran. The round-table meeting centered on Federal-Puntland bilateral cooperation, as well as the scheduled 2016 national elections. Among the main areas discussed within the Framework for Action were the ongoing federalization process, the implementation of previous treaties, the constitutional review process, border demarcation, resource-sharing, the integration of troops from different regions into the national army, and the establishment of a new Central State. The forum concluded with a signed agreement, which stipulates that Puntland will contribute 3,000 troops to the Somali National Army.

=== Tana Forum ===
In April 2015, Gaas led a Puntland ministerial delegation to Bahir Dar, Ethiopia, where the representatives had been invited to attend the Tana Forum. Among the Puntland delegates was Minister of Environment and Wildlife, Guled Salah Barre, as well as the Minister of Seaports. The official invitation was the second one that Gaas had received on behalf of Puntland and Somalia as a whole. Prime Minister of Ethiopia Hailemariam Desalegn and other Ethiopian government representatives welcomed the visiting delegation at the Bole International Airport in Addis Ababa. The Tana Forum is annually held between heads of state in Africa, and focuses on the economy, security and other key continental sectors. Gaas is therein scheduled to brief his counterparts on the sociopolitical situation in Puntland and Somalia at large, regional counter-terrorism operations and economic development, among other matters.

=== Infrastructure development ===
In May 2015, Gaas led a large Puntland delegation to Rome to discuss various bilateral matters. The official visit was expected to last several days. According to the regional president, he had received an invitation from the Italian government to hold talks on securing funds for infrastructure development projects. Ali also emphasized his administration's focus on ameliorating infrastructure in Puntland as part of the broader reconstruction and development process in Somalia.

=== 2019 Puntland presidential election ===
In December 2018, Abdiweli Gaas who announced his candidacy for re-election in the Puntland presidential election, was eliminated in the first round, securing only eight votes. Said Abdullahi Deni, a former Somali Minister of Planning, emerged as the new President of the Puntland, defeating Asad Osman Abdullahi 'Diyaano' in the final round. Deni garnered 35 votes from the 66 members of the Puntland House of Representatives, while Asad 'Diyaano' received 31 votes.

== Awards ==
- 2014 Top Three Economists in Africa, World Economic Studies, October 2014.
- 2005–2006 Excellence in Research Award, College of Business Administration, Niagara University, May 2006.
- Best Paper Award, European Applied Business Research Conference, Edinburgh, Scotland, June 2004.
- 2003–2004 Excellence in Research Award, College of Business Administration, Niagara University, May 2004.
- 2001 Best Article Award, Atlantic Economic Journal, October 2002.

== Works ==
=== Refereed publications ===
- "How robust is the effect of foreign aid on growth" with (Hodan Isse and Bill Peek), Journal of Business and Behavioral Sciences, Vol. 20, pp. 4–14, Fall 2009 (Lead Article).
- "The determinants of crime in Virginia: An empirical analysis" (with Bill Peek), forthcoming in Contemporary Issues in Educational Research, Vol. 2 (4), pp. 1–11, 2009 (Lead Article).
- "Is democracy a prerequisite for political stability?", International Business and Economics Research Journal, October 2004, Vol. 3 (10), pp. 39–47, Won the Best Paper Award.
- "Determinants of economic corruption: A cross-country comparison" (with Hodan Isse), Cato Journal, Winter Issue 2003, Vol. 22 (3), pp. 449–64. Cited by 58.
- "Institutional distortions, economic freedom and growth" (with Mark Crain), Cato Journal, Winter Issue 2002, Vol. 21 (3), pp. 415–26. Cited by 63.
- "Political regimes, economic freedom, institutions and growth" (with Mark Crain), Journal of Public Finance and Public Choice, 2001, Vol. XIX (1), pp. 3–22, Lead Article. Cited by 13.
- "Political stability, stable economic policies and growth: an empirical investigation", Atlantic Economic Journal, March Issue 2001, Vol. 29, pp. 87–106. Won the 2001 Best Article Award. Cited by 13
- "Economic freedom, democracy and growth", Journal of Private Enterprise, 1997, vol. 13, pp. 1–20, Lead Article. Cited by 30.

=== Refereed conference proceedings ===
- "Is Democracy a Prerequisite for Political Stability?" (Won the Best Paper Award), European Applied Business Research Conference, Edinburgh, Scotland, 14–18 June 2004.

Political offices
Preceded by Mohamed Abdullahi Mohamed; 31 October 2010 – 19 June 2011	Prime Minister of Somalia; 2011–2012	Succeeded by Abdi Farah Shirdon
