= Mohamed Abdullahi Omaar =

Somalian politician

- محمد عبدالله اومار
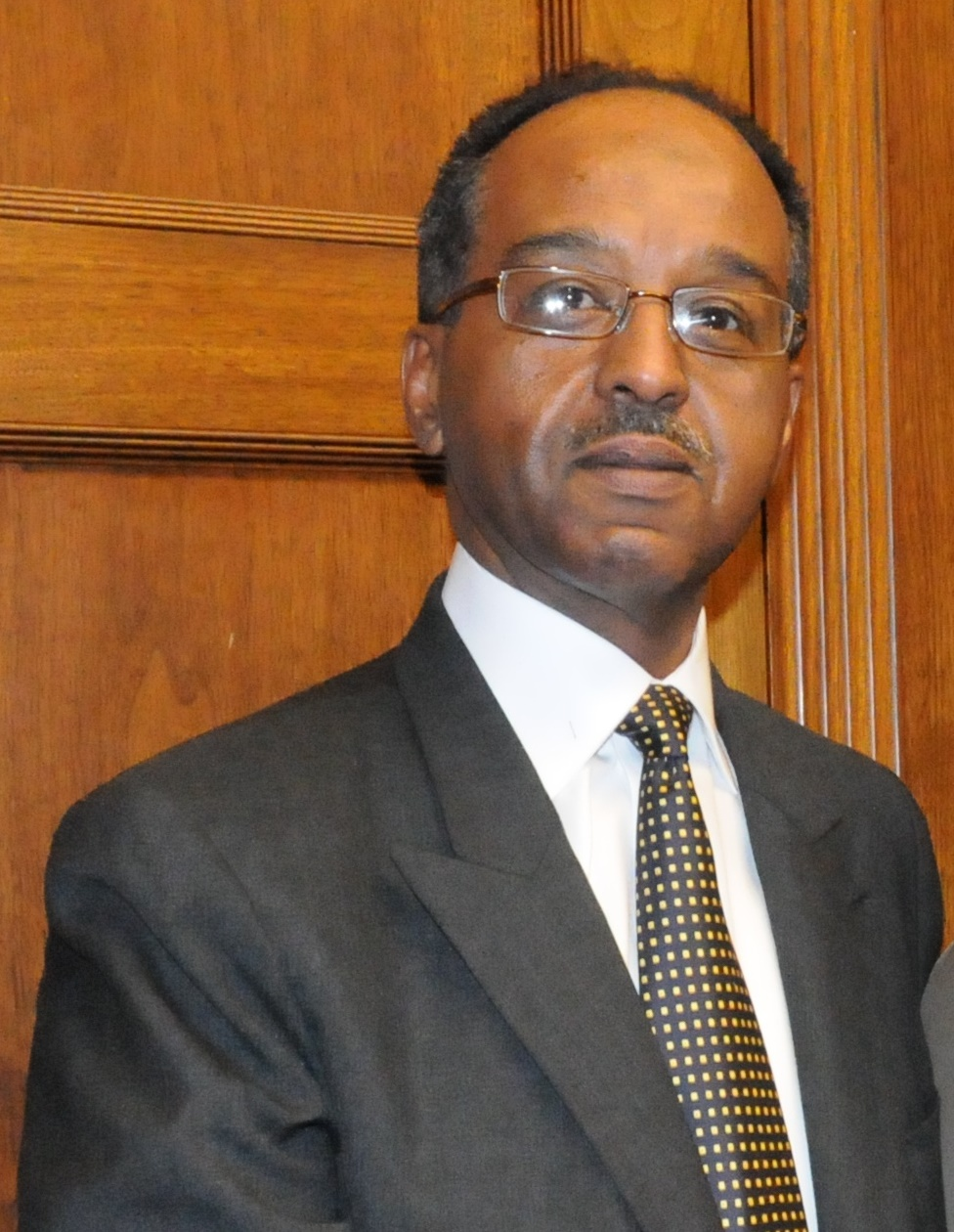

Foreign Minister of Somalia
- In office November 12, 2010 – February 20, 2012
- Prime Minister: Mohamed Abdullahi Mohamed
- Preceded by: Yusuf Hassan Ibrahim
- Succeeded by: Mohamed Mohamud Ibrahim

Personal details
- Born: 15 May 1952 (age 73)
- Party: Transitional Federal Government

Mohamed Abdullahi Omaar (Somali: Maxamed Cabdullahi Omaar, Arabic: محمد عبدالله أومار) is a Somali politician and diplomat. He twice served as the Foreign Minister of Somalia.

== Biography ==
He is the elder son of businessman Abdullahi Omaar. He also has three younger siblings: one of his sisters, Raqiya Omaar, is a human rights advocate, and his younger brother Rageh Omaar is a journalist. His family was based in Hargeisa.

Omaar was educated at a boarding school in Dorset before graduating from Trinity College, Oxford University.

== Political career ==
Omaar served as one of the Foreign Ministers of Somalia, having been appointed to the office on 20 February 2009 by then Prime Minister, Omar Abdirashid Ali Sharmarke.

After working in various other governmental posts, on 12 November 2010, Omaar was re-appointed Foreign Minister in addition to one of several Deputy Prime Ministers by the new Somali Premier, Mohamed Abdullahi Mohamed.

Starting August 2011, Mohamed Mohamud Ibrahim served as Omaar's Deputy Foreign Minister.

Following a cabinet reshuffle in February 2012, Abdullahi Haji Hassan succeeded Omaar as the new Foreign Minister.

Puntland and Qatar supported Omaar’s bid to become Prime Minister of Somalia in late 2013.

== See also ==
- Rageh Omaar
