= Presidential Palace, Garowe =

Puntland State House, Garowe

Coordinates: 8.4095°N 48.4683°E

Puntland State House
- Madaxtooyada Dawladda Puntland
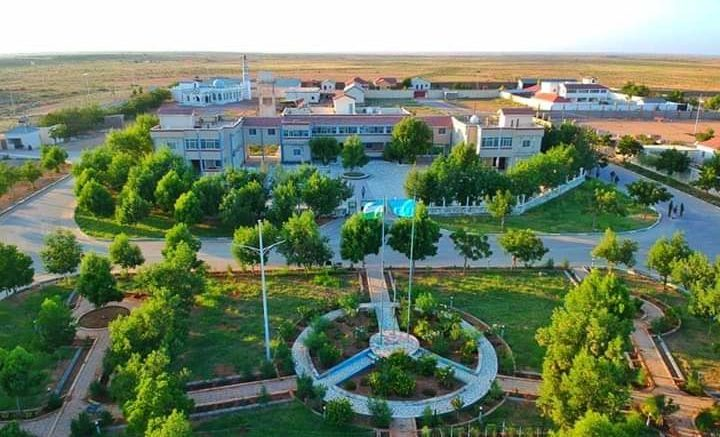
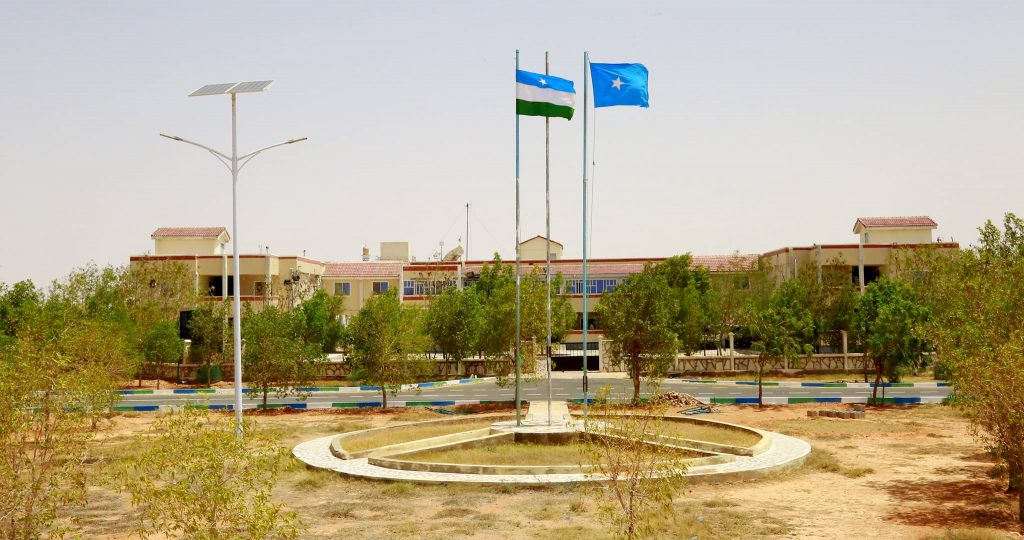
- Views of Puntland State House
- Interactive map of the Puntland State House area

General information
- Location: Garowe, Garowe District
- Construction started: 2009
- Completed: 2013
- Opened: April 15, 2013

Website
- plstate.so

The Puntland State House (Somali: Madaxtooyada Dawladda Puntland), (Arabic: القصر الرئاسي في أرض البنط); is a presidential palace in Garowe and significant state government building located in Government of Puntland, Somalia. Functioning as a representation of political authority and governance, this notable palace has held a crucial role in the region's administrative matters. Since its establishment, it has observed the changes in Puntland's political environment, reflecting the ambitions, difficulties, and accomplishments of the populace in their pursuit of self-determination.

== History ==
The first presidential palace operated by the Puntland State after its establishment was the former home of the local government in Garowe. After Somali Democratic Republic government collapsed in 1991.
