= Hodan Said Isse =

UNFPA Goodwill Ambassador and former First lady of Puntland

Her Excellency Hodan Said Isse Dr.
- Hodan Saciid Ciise
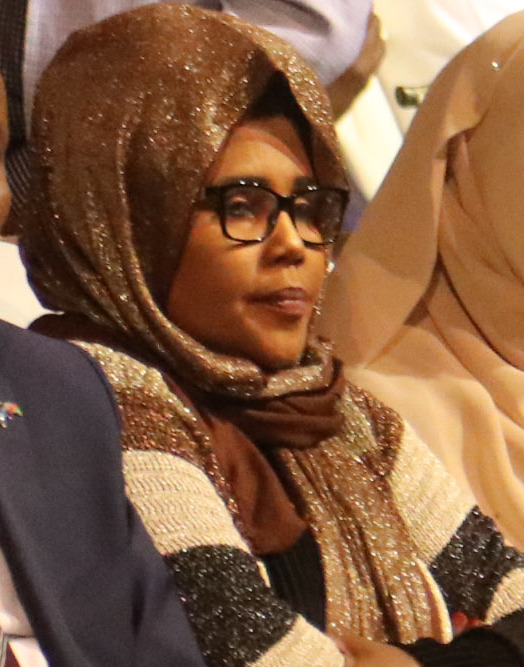

Board of Directors for the Central Bank of Somalia

member
- Incumbent
- Assumed office August 2, 2022

First Lady of the Puntland
- In office January 08, 2014 – January 08, 2019

Personal details
- Born: Hargeisa, Somalia
- Citizenship: Somali
- Spouse: Abdiweli Gaas
- Children: 3
- Education: George Mason University (PhD); Ohio University (MEcon); University at Buffalo School of Management (Clinical Assistant Professor Emeritus)
- Occupation: activist; businesswoman; economist; politician; writer
- Committees: Somali Mental Health Foundation
- Awards: 100 most influential Women in Somalia

Hodan Said Isse (Somali: Hodan Saciid Ciise; Arabic: هودان سعيد عيسى) is a UNFPA Goodwill ambassador for Puntland. She is the former First Lady of Puntland January 8, 2024 – January 8, 2019 and she is a wife of Abdiweli Mohamed Ali, the former President of Puntland.

== Early life and education ==
Hodan Isse, was born in Hargeisa, Somalia. She obtained a Ph.D. in economics from George Mason University in Virginia, along with two master's degrees, one in economics, the other in international development, from Ohio University. Her contributions to academia led to her being recognized as a clinical assistant professor emeritus at the University at Buffalo School of Management.

Hodan actively engages in philanthropic work. She co-founded and serves on the board of the United States-based Somali Mental Health Foundation, which focuses on improving mental health support for the Somali community. Additionally, she holds a position on the board of directors for the Central Bank of Somalia, demonstrating her involvement in the financial sector.

Hodan Isse's dedication to supporting refugees in adapting to their new lives is evident through her role as a founder of H.E.A.L., a nonprofit organization based in Buffalo, New York. H.E.A.L. is committed to assisting refugees in settling into their new communities and providing them with the necessary support.

== First lady of Puntland ==
Hodan Isse holds the honorable title of the first lady of Puntland, which further demonstrates her prominent position within the country. She is the wife of Abdiweli Mohamed Ali, the former President of Puntland.

=== UNFPA Goodwill Ambassador ===
Dr. Hodan Isse is the UNFPA Goodwill Ambassador in Puntland for the Campaign for Accelerated Reduction of Maternal Mortality in Africa (CARMMA). Garowe

On January 30, 2019, the President of Puntland, Said Abdullahi Deni, honored UNFPA Somalia Representative Nikolai Botev and Hodan Said Isse, former First Lady for Puntland, with awards for their exceptional leadership and dedication to sustainable institutional development in Puntland. Hodan Isse also serves as the UNFPA Goodwill Ambassador in Puntland for the Campaign for Accelerated Reduction of Maternal Mortality in Africa (CARMMA).

== Awards and honors ==
- Winner of the Outstanding Educational Achievement Award for International Somali Awards 2020.
- 100 most influential Women in Somalia
