= Germany–Somalia relations =

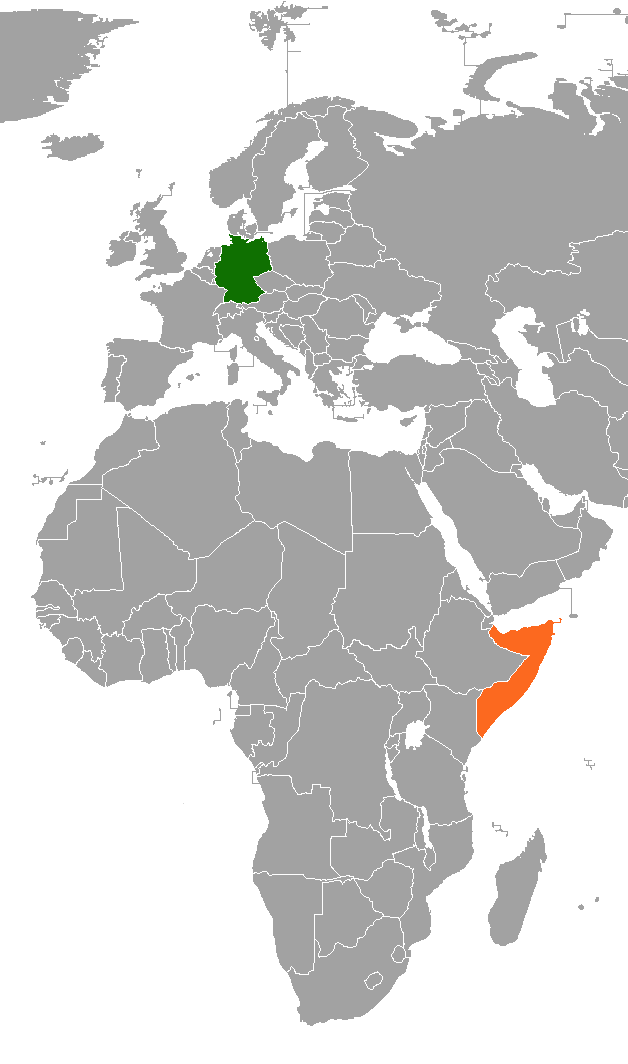

- Germany: Somalia

Germany–Somalia relations have intensified since 2012 after the political and security situation in Somalia improved, according to information from the German Foreign Office. Germany has not had an ambassador to Somalia since 1989, and the German Ambassador in Nairobi is responsible for relations with Somalia instead.

== History ==
The German explorer Karl Klaus von der Decken explored Somalia and died near Baardheere in 1865. In the late 19th century, the German Empire developed colonial ambitions in Somalia. In 1885 and 1886, representatives of the German East Africa Company signed several treaties with local rulers on the Somali coast. A short-lived settlement was established in Halule, and plans were made by Karl Ludwig Jühlke and Joachim Graf von Pfeil, respectively, to build the Hohenzollernhafen in Wubushi Bay. With the Heligoland-Zanzibar Treaty of 1890, Germany abandoned its colonial ambitions in Somalia, and the territories claimed by the German East African Company fell to British East Africa.

Upon Somalia's independence in 1960, the country established diplomatic relations with West Germany. Diplomatic relations were also established with East Germany in 1970. In October 1977, the special police unit GSG 9 successfully freed the passengers of Lufthansa Flight 181 hijacked by Palestinian terrorists at Mogadishu International Airport. The events are considered to have triggered the suicide of leading members of the Red Army Faction (RAF) at Stammheim Prison, which in turn resulted in the killing of Hanns Martin Schleyer by the RAF.

In 1978, the Somali Democratic Republic opened an embassy in Bonn, the capital of West Germany. The beginning of the Somali civil war led to the closure of the German embassy in the country and the complete disintegration of the Somali state. Reunified Germany provided aid to alleviate the famine in the country in 1992, and a year later German blue helmets were deployed to the UN operation UNOSOM II. It was not until 2013 that diplomatic relations with Somalia were re-established. In 2014, the German Bundestag approved the training of Somali security forces as part of the EU mission EUTM Somalia.

== Economic relations ==
Economic relations are described by the German Foreign Office as "virtually non-existent". Somalia is among the poorest and most unstable countries in the world, which significantly hinders the development of trade and economic exchange. The bilateral trade volume between the two countries was only 29 million euros in 2021.

== Development assistance ==
Development cooperation with Somalia resumed in 2014. Development aid of 350 million euros was provided until 2019, making Germany one of the largest donors to Somalia. In addition to economic aid, Germany is also assisting the country in building democratic and federal state structures and establishing a functioning police force. Germany also provides assistance to persons who have fled within the country and to Somali refugees in neighboring states. Projects in Somalia are supported by, among others, the Verein für Entwicklung und humanitäre Hilfe Somalias e.V. based in Wiesbaden.

== Security cooperation ==
Germany is involved in various missions within the framework of the EU and the UN to improve the security situation in the country. It trains security forces within the framework of the EUCAP Somalia and EUTM Somalia missions and is involved in attempts to strengthen state and civil society structures in the country. Germany is also involved in the anti-piracy operation ATALANTA and the United Nations Assistance Mission in Somalia (UNSOM).

== Diplomatic missions ==
- Germany does not have an embassy in Somalia. The German Embassy in Nairobi is responsible for relations with Somalia.
- Somalia has an embassy in Berlin.
