= Transitional Federal Government of Somalia =

Government of Somalia from 2004 to 2012

Transitional Federal Government of the Republic of Somalia
- 2004–2012
- Flag Coat of arms
- Anthem: (2004–2012) "Soomaaliyeey toosoo" (2012) "Qolobaa Calankeed"
- Status: Provisional government
- Capital: Mogadishu
- Common languages: Somali · Arabic · Italian
- President
  - 2004–2008: Abdullahi Yusuf Ahmed
  - 2009–2012: Sheikh Sharif Ahmed
- Prime Minister
  - 2004–2007: Ali Mohammed Ghedi
  - 2007–2009: Nur Hassan Hussein
  - 2009–2010: Omar Sharmarke
  - 2010–2011: Mohamed Farmajo
  - 2011–2012: Abdiweli Gaas
- Legislature: Transitional Federal Parliament
- Historical era: Somali Civil War
  - Transitional charter: 14 October 2004
  - New government: 20 August 2012
- ISO 3166 code: SO
Preceded by	Succeeded by
Transitional National Government of Somalia	Federal Government of Somalia

The Transitional Federal Government (TFG; Somali: Dowladda Federaalka Kumeelgaarka; Arabic: الحكومة الاتحادية الانتقالية; Italian: Governo federale di transizione della Somalia) was the internationally recognized provisional government of Somalia from 14 October 2004 until 20 August 2012. It was established in Nairobi, Kenya, following the Transitional National Government (TNG), and formed part of an internationally backed peace process aimed at restoring state institutions after the collapse of the Somali Democratic Republic in 1991. The TFG operated under the Transitional Federal Charter and represented the 14th attempt to establish a central government since the outbreak of civil war.

Initially based in Kenya, the TFG relocated to Somalia in 2005 amid internal divisions and low public confidence. The first administration, led by President Abdullahi Yusuf, was plagued by disputes over the deployment of foreign troops, deep factionalism, and competing claims of authority. With strong military and political backing from Ethiopia, the TFG was installed in Mogadishu following Ethiopia's 2006 invasion to overthrow the Islamic Courts Union (ICU). This intervention triggered a protracted insurgency led by Al-Shabaab and other Islamist factions. The subsequent Ethiopian military occupation severely undermined the TFG’s legitimacy and contributed to widespread violence, displacement, and the rise of one of Africa’s deadliest insurgencies.

By 2008, most of the country had fallen under insurgent control, leaving the TFG on the brink of collapse. More than 80% of the police and army had deserted. During a UN-brokered reconciliation process, the TFG entered into a power-sharing agreement with the insurgent Alliance for the Re-liberation of Somalia (ARS). President Yusuf resigned after the TFG parliament initiated impeachment proceedings against him, and former ICU chairman Sharif Sheikh Ahmed was subsequently elected president. Despite the transition, the new administration remained fragile and faced renewed insurgent advances, nearly collapsing again in 2009 as the Somali Civil War entered a new phase.

The TFG struggled with endemic corruption, serious internal conflict, weak institutions, and limited territorial control. Despite international support—including backing from the African Union and the United States—from its inception it remained heavily dependent on foreign troops for survival. A transitional roadmap was adopted in 2011, and that year with support from the African Union Mission in Somalia (AMISOM) that had first deployed in 2007, the TFG took control of key territory, including Mogadishu.

On 20 August 2012, the TFG’s mandate formally ended with the establishment of the present Federal Government of Somalia (FGS).

== Background ==
During early 1991, the government of the Somali Democratic Republic collapsed as the Somali Rebellion transitioned into the full scale Somali Civil War. Between 1991 and 2000, no central government existed in Somalia. In 2000, the Transitional National Government (TNG) was formed in Djibouti.

Somalia's powerful neighbor, Ethiopia, immediately opposed the TNG, fearing that an independent Somali state would renew its long standing claims on the Ogaden region. Ethiopia sponsored the formation of opposition alliances to preserve its strategic interests and worked to undermine the TNG. After the 9/11 attacks the following year, the Ethiopian government openly accused the TNG leadership of being Islamic extremists who were pro-Bin Laden. According to academics Ashley Elliot and Georg-Sebastian Holzer, "Ethiopia’s success in undermining the nascent interim government proved that Addis Ababa effectively exercised the power of veto over the political direction of its disorderly neighbor."

Following the collapse of the TNG administration another attempt was made in to create a Somali government. In 2004, the Transitional Federal Government (TFG) was formed in Kenya.

== History ==
In October 2004, Abdullahi Yusuf Ahmed was elected President of the Transitional Federal Government (TFG) with strong backing from Ethiopia. The Ethiopian government supported Yusuf, anticipating that he would abandon Somalia’s long-standing claim to the Ogaden region. Prior to his presidency, Yusuf had been part of an Ethiopian-backed coalition of warlords that had disrupted the earlier Transitional National Government (TNG) formed in 2000. After taking office, Yusuf appointed Ali Mohammed Gedi as prime minister. However, on 11 December 2004, parliament passed a vote of no confidence in Gedi’s government, declaring his appointment unconstitutional. Despite this, Yusuf reappointed Gedi only two days later, though by the end of the year, Gedi had not reconstituted his cabinet. According to I.M. Lewis, Yusuf's election as president and his appointment of Gedi, who had ties to Ethiopian prime minister Meles Zenawi, were heavily influenced by Ethiopia. These connections played a key role in the Ethiopian invasion of Somalia two years later. The New York Times reported that PM Gedi’s rise to power had been effectively of Ethiopian creation.

In 2004, Yusuf made his first foreign visit as president when he travelled to Ethiopia. During the trip to Addis Ababa he requested 20,000 Ethiopian troops to back his government. The majority of Somali society, including much of the newly formed TFG, deeply opposed any foreign military intervention on Somali soil. An African Union fact finding mission to Somalia in 2005 found that the overwhelming majority of Somalis rejected troops from neighbouring states entering the country. During 2005 the TFG was deeply divided over a possible deployment of foreign troops in Somalia. Various prominent Somali leaders and groups threatened to forcefully oppose such an intervention.

=== Entry into Somalia and internal divisions (2005) ===
In March 2005, a debate on deploying foreign troops, including Ethiopian forces, to Somalia led to violence after the resolution was rejected by a vote of 156 to 55. A brawl was initiated by some opposing the result, injuring several MPs, and the vote was declared invalid thereafter. By insisting on the deployment of foreign troops from countries bordering Somalia, President Abdullahi Yusuf and his Prime Minister Ali Gedi disregarded the views of their cabinet, a clear majority of transitional parliament, and much of the public. Kenya, which had been hosting the conference, called the events disrespectful to its government and warned the TFG to behave as "we prepare you for your return home". Public opinion in Kenya turned against the TFG, as many citizens accused it of remaining in Kenya for per diem payments.

Under heavy pressure from Kenya, the government prepared to move into Somalia. During June 2005, the TFG moved into Somalia for the first time and promised to establish its authority across the country. Instead it quickly devolved into infighting, and serious internal divisions arose. A seat of power could not be agreed on. 100 members of the 275-strong parliament - led by Speaker Sharif Hassan Aden - chose to move to Mogadishu, stating they would try to restore stability to the capital. On the other hand President Abdullahi Yusuf, Prime Minister Ali Gedi and their supporters set up base in Jowhar, 90 km north of Mogadishu, citing insecurity in the capital.

Internal divisions were so serious that open warfare almost broke out between the two TFG factions in September 2005, coming dangerously close to a major conflict. Neither parliament or the full cabinet had met since the March fight in Kenya. No progress was made in establishing a minimally functional government or creating a civil service. For the remainder of 2005 the TFG remained deeply divided. So little was achieved over 2005 that some observers argued that the March fighting had been "the only high point for the TFG" as MPs had not simply rubber stamped proposals. Despite these deep dysfunctions and incapacity to rule, the notion that the TFG was the legitimate government of Somalia persisted—both in international legal discourse and in the strategic ambitions of Ethiopia.

=== Ethiopian military occupation (2006–2009) ===
In February 2006, the TFG struck a deal with the warlord in control of Baidoa city, and moved the seat of government there. Several TFG ministers were members of a CIA backed alliance of warlords fighting the rising Islamic Courts Union (ICU) in Mogadishu. After the ICU defeated the warlords, the TFG fired the ministers who had been a part of the alliance. In Baidoa, the TFG enjoyed the support of the warlord who controlled the city and had earlier prevented the government from entering. The TFG was dysfunctional from its inception and "failed miserably" as a functioning government.

The new Transitional Federal Government under the Presidency of Abdullahi Yusuf Ahmed wished to establish authority over Somalia, and sought assistance from Ethiopian troops who also sought to forcibly depose the Islamic Courts Union. In a move widely opposed by many TFG parliamentarians, President Yusuf made the widely unpopular decision to invite Ethiopian troops to prop up his administration. As an institution, the TFG did not consent to or approve of the Ethiopian military intervention. No parliamentary approval was given for a decision openly opposed by a significant portion of the government. A group of TFG parliamentarians issued a statement demanding Ethiopia cease its "aggression against Somalia" and withdraw. During late July 2006, over a dozen members of parliament resigned in protest of the Ethiopian deployment, and by August 2006 the government was mired in a severe internal crisis and at risk of collapse.

During November 2006, several top ranking members of the TFG led by Sharif Hassan Sheikh Aden sent a delegation to Mogadishu to resume talks with the ICU, which Aden had reported to be progressing well. According to an Africa Intelligence report, "...precisely at that moment, President Abdullahi Yusuf, who has been close to Ethiopia for many years, excluded all negotiation with the UIC and called for forceful action against the Somalian Islamists." Historian Gweyne Dwer observed that large numbers of TFG members resigned as it became clear that the government had fallen under the complete sway of the Ethiopians and Central Intelligence Agency. Government soldiers began defecting over to the ICU. Professor Abdi Ismail Samatar observes that the Ethiopians had complete control over the TFG headquarters and had begun arming warlords defeated by the ICU.

On 3 December 2006, the TFG speaker of parliament Sharif Hassan Adan announced that Ethiopia had deployed a "massive military force" of 15,000 troops. Adan sought to reconcile with the ICU and stated that the blame for any war in Somalia lay on the Ethiopian government led by Meles Zenawi. In the last days of December 2006, the Ethiopian National Defence Force seized control of Mogadishu and installed the TFG, who had announced that the rivaling Islamic forces had been defeated and that no further major fighting was expected to take place. The TFG proved to be incapable of controlling Mogadishu, or of surviving on its own without Ethiopian troops. Most of the population of the city opposed the TFG and perceived it to be a puppet government. The military occupation was marked by indiscriminate violence towards civilians by the Ethiopian army and TFG. Homes were raided in search of ICU loyalists, with lootings, beatings and executions of suspected collaborators commonplace. The Islamic Courts Union splintered into several different insurgent factions. Some of the more radical elements, including Al-Shabaab, regrouped to wage an insurgency against the Ethiopian military presence in Somalia and the TFG.

==== Emergence of insurgency ====
The TFG and the Ethiopians soon began to run into increasing opposition from remnants of the Islamic Courts Union, and despite moving much of the government in January to Mogadishu, many ministers chose to remain in Baidoa. Several high ranking figures of the TFG, including ex-speaker Sharif Hassan Sheikh Aden, were fired for calling for a compromise with the ICU. Members of the TFG present in Nairobi were threatened with expulsion by the Kenyan foreign minister after they publicly called for the withdrawal of Ethiopian troops.

In the year after the invasion, the TFG parliament was purged of opposition figures and represented a narrow coalition of Somali society. For much of 2007 the government was besieged and dysfunctional, with virtually no progress being made for political transition. It was plagued with charges of corruption and abuse, including the obstruction of relief aid deliveries. The TFG security forces, both police and military, were notoriously undisciplined, committing numerous acts of murder and sexual violence against civilians. Internal hostilities within the security forces even resulted in shootouts between units as they fought over control of revenue from illegal checkpoints.

The TFG engaged in extensive violence and suffered from serious corruption. At the start of 2007, the TFG imposed martial law. It issued directives which included a ban on public meetings, attempts to organize political campaigns and major media outlets, which were enforced by Ethiopian troops. Warlord militia checkpoints began reappearing on Mogadishu roads and insecurity started once again returning to the city. In an effort to suppress the growing insurgency, the Ethiopian army resorted to heavy-handed military tactics, including the use of white phosphorus munitions and heavy artillery on civilian areas. This greatly intensified resentment and distrust of the TFG-Ethiopia alliance from Somali citizens. During the fierce fighting in Mogadishu between ENDF/TFG forces and the insurgency, the Ethiopians reportedly engaged in the carpet bombing of neighborhoods. President Abdullahi Yusuf announced in a radio address that “any place from which a bullet is fired, we will bombard it, regardless of whoever is there.” The presence of Ethiopian troops reinforced the authoritarian behavior of the TFG. Time magazine reported that the battles raging in the Mogadishu at the time were 'some of the most savage fighting' the capital had ever experienced. European Union ambassador to Somalia Walter J. Lindner sent a letter to President Yusuf condemning the deliberate blockade the delivery of urgently needed humanitarian supplies relief and the bombardment of civilian areas sanctioned by the government. The TFG and the Ethiopians had little public support, and Ethiopian troops rarely conducted patrols due to frequent losses to Somali insurgents. The government lacked the credibility, legitimacy, and capacity to rule effectively. It continually refused to consider any new power arrangement that would broaden its governing base throughout 2007.

By the beginning of 2008, insurgent pressure had mounted on the Ethiopian and TFG troops in the south-central regions of Somalia. The Shabeelle, the Jubba Valley along with the Bay and Bakool regions in particular became hot spots. Islamist fighters gained strength and were able to move from different towns with little resistance as they had accrued significant public support. What had at first seemed to be a series of probes soon morphed into a significant insurgent offensive against Ethiopian and TFG forces. The TFG suffered further serious internal divisions in this period. During 2008, TFG president Abdullahi Yusuf began undermining the new prime minister, Nur Hassan Hussein. PM Nur had replaced PM Ali Gedi in November 2007, who was widely viewed as corrupt and an impediment to the reconciliation process. Much of the criminality in south Somalia during 2008 was linked to TFG security forces. In April 2008, Oxford Analytica observed that the TFG was 'little more' than a collection of armed rival groups. Abattle erupted in Mogadishu after TFG forces began robbing a marketplace, resulting Islamist insurgents inflicting heavy losses on the TFG forces after they came defend the merchants. Human Rights Watch report accused the TFG of human rights abuses and war crimes including murder, rape, assault, and looting. The report also states that the TFG police force were implicated in arbitrary arrests of ordinary civilians in order to extort ransoms from their families.

During June a faction of the ARS and the TFG signed a ceasefire agreement after months of talks in Djibouti. The agreement was met with resistance from elements within the TFG, chiefly President Abdullahi Yusuf. The Djibouti Peace Process called for the withdrawal of Ethiopian troops from Somalia. At the time the TFG was crippled by infighting and largely under the control of warlords as insurgent attacks worsened by the day. By mid-2008, President Yusuf had lost all the support he had accumulated in the international community. His primary backer, Ethiopia, had also become tired of the TFG president only offering military answers to serious political issues.

==== Collapse of first TFG government ====
By November 2008, the Islamist insurgency fighting against the Ethiopian army and TFG had effectively won. The majority of south and central Somalia, along with the capital was under the control of Islamist factions. Ethiopia had redeployed much of its army out of Somalia by the end of the year. Due to rampant and pervasive corruption within the government, salaries went unpaid. More than 80% of TFG military and security forces, nearly 15,000 personnel, deserted the government by the end of 2008.

Rife with infighting and serious divisions, the TFG was once again on the brink of collapse by November 2008. On 26 October, a ceasefire agreement was signed between the Alliance for the Re-liberation of Somalia and the TFG. It was to go into effect on 5 November. President Abdullahi Yusuf admitted that the country was slipping to the insurgency and "raised the prospect his government could completely collapse." Ethiopia announced it would withdraw its troops from Somalia by the end of 2008 on 28 November. To shore up his rule in Mogadishu, Yusuf deployed thousands of his own troops from Puntland to Mogadishu. Financial support for this effort was provided by the autonomous region's government. This left little revenue for Puntland's own security forces and civil service employees, leaving the territory vulnerable to piracy and terrorist attacks.

In December 2008, the TFG parliament moved to impeach President Abdullahi Yusuf, accusing him of being a dictator and an obstacle to peace. After TFG prime minister Nur Hassan had blamed Yusuf for the TFG's failures, Yusuf had fired him without the required approval of parliament. The TFG once again found itself based largely out of Baidoa and the African Union released a statement declaring the insurgency controlled most the country. That month President Yusuf resigned after stating that he had lost control of the country to Islamist insurgents. The TFG failed to make any meaningful impact on the ground during is tenure and presided over one of the bloodiest periods in modern Somali history. During January 2009, the first Transitional Federal Government collapsed and Al-Shabaab overran the seat of the government in Baidoa.

=== Coalition government (2009–2010) ===
Between 31 May and 9 June 2008, representatives of Somalia's federal government and the moderate Alliance for the Re-liberation of Somalia (ARS) group of Islamist rebels participated in peace talks in Djibouti brokered by the former United Nations Special Envoy to Somalia, Ahmedou Ould-Abdallah. The conference ended with a signed agreement calling for the withdrawal of Ethiopian troops in exchange for the cessation of armed confrontation. Parliament was subsequently expanded to 550 seats to accommodate ARS members, which then elected Sheikh Sharif Sheikh Ahmed, the former ARS chairman, to office. President Sharif shortly afterwards appointed Omar Abdirashid Ali Sharmarke, the son of slain former president Abdirashid Ali Sharmarke, as the nation's new prime minister.

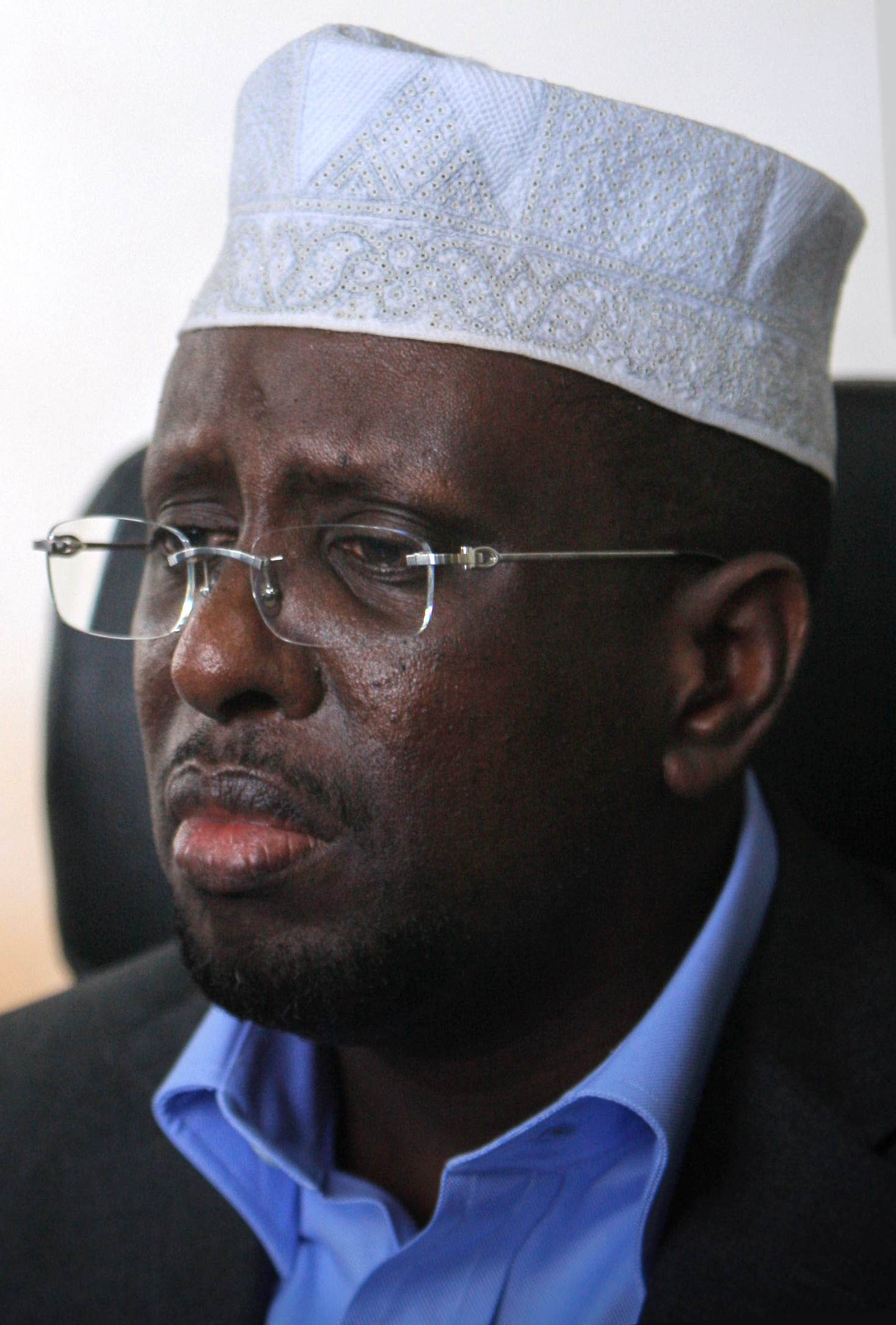
ICU Chairman Sharif Sheikh Ahmed, who later became a President of the Transitional Federal Government.

With the help of a small team of African Union troops, the coalition government also began a counteroffensive in February 2009 to retake control of the southern half of the country. To solidify its control of southern Somalia, the TFG formed an alliance with the Islamic Courts Union, other members of the Alliance for the Re-liberation of Somalia, and Ahlu Sunna Waljama'a, a moderate Sufi militia. Furthermore, Al-Shabaab and Hizbul Islam, the two main Islamist groups in opposition, began to fight amongst themselves in mid-2009.

As a truce, in March 2009, Somalia's coalition government announced that it would re-implement Shari'a as the nation's official judicial system. However, conflict continued in the southern and central parts of the country. Within months, the coalition government had gone from holding about 70% of south-central Somalia's conflict zones, territory which it had inherited from the previous Yusuf administration, to losing control of over 80% of the disputed territory to the Islamist insurgents.

During the coalition government's brief tenure, Somalia topped the Fund For Peace's Failed States Index for three consecutive years. In 2009, Transparency International ranked the nation in last place on its annual Corruption Perceptions Index (CPI), a metric that purports to show the prevalence of corruption in a country's public sector. A World Bank report also alleged that about $130 million that the coalition government had received over this 2009 and 2010 period was unaccounted for. In July 2012, a report by the UN Monitoring Group on Somalia and Eritrea (SEMG) submitted to the UN Security Council alleged that between 2009 and 2010, around 70 percent of funds that had been earmarked for development and reconstruction in Somalia were unaccounted for. President Sharif Sheikh Ahmed rebuked the claims, indicating in particular that a $3 million payment from the Government of Oman had gone toward legitimate government expenses, including loans, security forces and parliament.

=== Transition to Federal Government (2010–2012) ===
On 14 October 2010, diplomat Mohamed Abdullahi Mohamed was appointed the new prime minister of Somalia after the resignation of Premier Omar Abdirashid Ali Sharmarke.

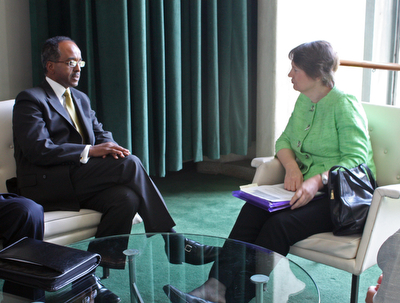
Foreign Minister Mohamed Abdullahi Omaar in a meeting with UNDP Administrator Helen Clark and other diplomats at the UN headquarters.

Per the Transitional Federal Government's (TFG) Charter, Prime Minister Mohamed named a new Cabinet on 12 November 2010, which has been lauded by the international community. The allotted ministerial positions were reduced from 39 to 18. Only two Ministers from the previous Cabinet were reappointed: Hussein Abdi Halane, the former Minister of Finance and a well-regarded figure in the international community, was put in charge of a consolidated Ministry of Finance and Treasury; and Dr. Mohamud Abdi Ibrahim remained the minister of Commerce and Industry. Ahlu Sunna Waljama'a, a moderate Sufi group and an important military ally of the TFG, was also accorded the key Interior and Labour ministries. The remaining ministerial positions were largely assigned to technocrats new to the Somali political arena.

In its first 50 days in office, Prime Minister Mohamed's new administration completed its first monthly payment of stipends to government soldiers, and announced the beginning of a full biometric register for the security forces, aiming to take four months. Additional members of the Independent Constitutional Commission were also appointed to engage Somali constitutional lawyers, religious scholars and experts in Somali culture over the nation's upcoming new constitution, a key part of the government's Transitional Federal Tasks. In addition, high level federal delegations were dispatched to defuse clan-related tensions in several regions. According to the prime minister of Somalia, to improve transparency, Cabinet ministers fully disclosed their assets and signed a code of ethics.

An Anti-Corruption Commission with the power to carry out formal investigations and to review government decisions and protocols was also established, so as to more closely monitor all activities by public officials. It was announced that unnecessary trips abroad by members of government would be prohibited. A budget outlining 2011's federal expenditures was also put before and approved by members of parliament, with the payment of civil service employees prioritized. In addition, a full audit of government property and vehicles is being put into place. On the war front, the new government and its AMISOM allies also managed to secure control of Mogadishu by August 2011. According to the African Union and Prime Minister Mohamed, with increasing troop strength the pace of territorial gains is expected to greatly accelerate.

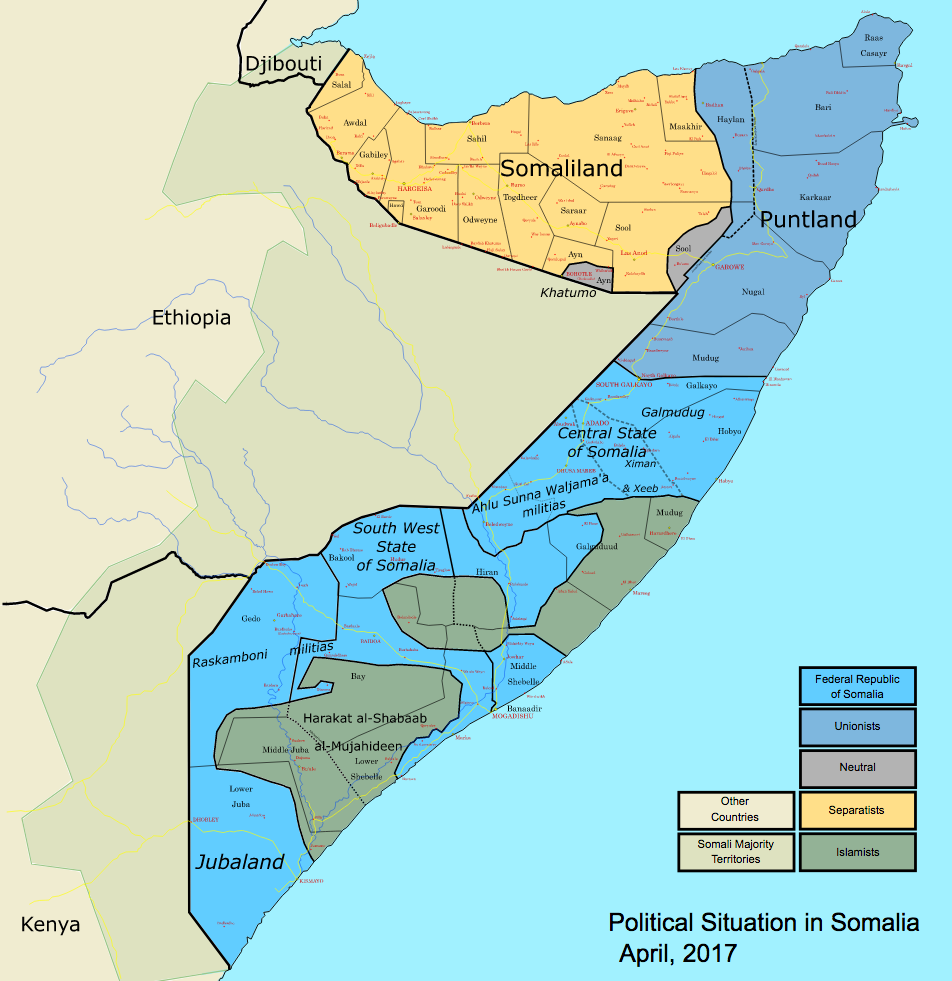
Political map of Somalia (as of 25 May 2012).

In June 2011, following the Kampala Accord, the mandates of the president, the Parliament Speaker, and deputies were extended until August 2012.

On 19 June 2011, Mohamed Abdullahi Mohamed resigned from his position as Prime Minister of Somalia as part of the conditions of the Kampala Accord. The agreement would also see the mandates of the president, the Parliament Speaker and deputies extended until August 2012, after which point new elections are to be organized, including a parliamentary vote-based presidential election. Abdiweli Mohamed Ali, Mohamed's former Minister of Planning and International Cooperation, was later named permanent prime minister.

Backed by the United Nations, the African Union, as well as the United States, the TFG battled Al Shabaab insurgents to assume full control of the southern part of the country. By August 2011, the government, under President Sharif Sheikh Ahmed and its AMISOM (African Union Mission in Somalia) allies managed to secure control over all of Mogadishu.

In February 2012, Somali government officials met in the northeastern town of Garowe to discuss post-transition arrangements. After extensive deliberations attended by regional actors and international observers, the conference ended in a signed agreement between TFG president Sharif Sheikh Ahmed, Prime Minister Abdiweli Mohamed Ali, Speaker of Parliament Sharif Adan Sharif Hassan, Puntland president Abdirahman Mohamed Farole, Galmudug president Mohamed Ahmed Alim and Ahlu Sunnah Wal Jama'a representative Khalif Abdulkadir Noor stipulating that: a) a new 225-member bicameral parliament would be formed, consisting of an upper house seating 54 senators as well as a lower house; b) 30% of the National Constituent Assembly (NCA) is earmarked for women; c) the president is to be appointed via a constitutional election; and d) the prime minister is selected by the president and he/she then names his/her Cabinet. On 23 June 2012, the Somali federal and regional leaders met again and approved a draft constitution after several days of deliberation. The National Constituent Assembly overwhelmingly passed the new constitution on 1 August, with 96% voting for it, 2% against it, and 2% abstaining.

== Structure of TFG ==
The Transitional Federal Government (TFG) constituted the executive branch of government, with the TFP serving as the legislative branch. The government was headed by the president of Somalia, to whom the cabinet reported through the prime minister.

=== Constitution ===
Alongside the national constitution, the Transitional Federal Charter of the Somali Republic (TFC) laid out the basic way in which the government was to operate.

=== Parliament ===
The Transitional Federal Parliament elected the president and prime minister, and had the authority to pass and veto laws. It was also in charge of governance and administration of Mogadishu. Each of the four major clans held 61 seats, while an alliance of minority clans held 31 seats.

After an alliance with the Islamic Courts Union and other Islamist groups, the Islamists were awarded 200 seats. Representatives of citizens' groups and representatives of the Somali diaspora held 75 seats. By law, at least 12% of all representatives had to be women. Members of parliament are selected through traditional clan leaders or shura councils.

=== Executive branch ===
A president was elected by Parliament. The president was head of government, and chose the prime minister, who would lead the cabinet.

=== Council of Ministers ===
The Cabinet, formally known as the Council of Ministers, at first comprised 42 offices, but was later slimmed down to 31 portfolios during a period of contention in 2006. In 2010, it was further scaled down to 18 posts. The Council of Ministers was appointed by the prime minister.

The government posts and ministerial positions were as follows:

Cabinet Position	Office Holder
Minister of Foreign Affairs	Abdullahi Haji Hassan Mohamed Nuur
Minister of Defence	Hussein Arab Isse
Minister of Planning & International Co-operation	Abdullahi Godah Barre
Minister of Justice & Religious Issues	Ahmed Hasan Gabobe (Ugas Bille)
Minister of Interior Affairs & National Security	Abdisamad Mallin Mahamud Sheikh Hasan
Minister of Finance & Treasury	Dr. Abdinaasir Mahamed Abdulle
Minister of Women & Family Affairs	Casho Ismaan Aqil
Minister of Agriculture & Livestock	Abullahi Haaji Hasan Mahamed Nur
Minister of Health	Dr. Abdicasiis Sheikh Yusuf
Minister of Information, Posts & Telecommunication	Abdulqaadir Mahamed Ahmed
Minister of Employment, Youth & Sports	Mahamed Muhiyadin Sheikh Mursal
Minister of Fisheries	Abdiraxmaan Sheikh Ibrahim
Minister of Transport & Ports	Adan Abdullaahi Adan
Minister of Federal Constitution & Reconciliation	Abdiraxmaan Hosh Jibril
Minister of General Affairs, Housing & Reconstruction	Jaylani Nur Iikar
Minister of Water, Minerals & Energy	Abdulqaadir Maxamed Dhiaisow
Minister of Education & Culture	Prof. Axmed Aydiid Ibrahim
Minister of Trade & Industry	Abdiwahaab Ugas Huseen Ugas Khalif

=== Judiciary ===
Despite some significant political differences between them, all of these administrations shared similar legal structures, much of which were predicated on the judicial systems of previous Somali administrations. These similarities in civil law included:

- A charter which affirmed the primacy of shari'a or Islamic law, although in practice shari'a was applied mainly to matters such as marriage, divorce, inheritance and civil issues.
- The charter guaranteed respect for universal standards of human rights to all subjects of the law. It also assured the independence of the judiciary, which in turn was protected by a judicial committee.
- There was a three-tier judicial system including a supreme court, a court of appeals, and courts of first instance (either divided between district and regional courts, or a single court per region).
- The laws of the civilian government which were in effect prior to the military coup d'état that saw the Barre regime into power were to remain in force unless the laws were amended.

=== Education ===
The Ministry of Education was officially responsible for education in Somalia. Several universities in Somalia, including Mogadishu University, were ranked among the 100 best universities in Africa despite the harsh environment, which was hailed as a triumph for grass-roots initiatives.

=== Healthcare ===
The Ministry of Health headed the country's healthcare system. The Minister of Health was Qamar Adan Ali. The autonomous Puntland region had its own local Ministry of Health, which is headed by Dr. Mohamed Bashir Ali Bihi, as did the Somaliland region in northwestern Somalia, with its Ministry of Health led by Osman Bile Ali.

== Military, police and intelligence ==
The TFG security forces, including the Somali Armed Forces, were technically under the control of the Ministry of Defence. Yet TFG militia was dominated by clan based paramilitary units, who answered only to their clan commander and often refused to take orders from the Ministry of Defense. Many "security forces" were only nominally under the control of the government, and in many instances these clan-dominated groupings were hostile to each another. Ethiopia, the TFG's closes ally at the time, took the lead in training and integrating a Somali army but failed. Between 2004 and 2008, over 10,000 Ethiopian trained TFG soldiers deserted or defected to the insurgency. When Ethiopian forces withdrew from Somalia in 2008, the task of forming a new army was given to AMISOM. At this point there was still no meaningful chain of command.

From 2006 to 2009, the ENDF completely managed the salaries of TFG security forces, who had to get personal approval from the Ethiopian army for their wages. A major general in the TFG forces accused the Ethiopians of seeking the undermine the establishment of a Somali National Army, assassinating officers who didn't obey their orders and provoking TFG officers with indiscriminate violence against civilians.

The basis of the present iteration of the Somali National Army stems from the late 2008 agreement made by TFG and the insurgent Alliance for the Re-Liberation of Somalia. After the Ethiopian withdrawal and the election of a new Somali government led by former ICU head Sharif Ahmed in early 2009, elements of the Islamic Courts forces and broader insurgency were integrated into the SNA. By this point the SNA was estimated to be 5,000 to 7,600 strong.

In August 2011, a TFG-Puntland cooperative agreement called for the creation of a Somali Marine Force unit, of which the already established Puntland Maritime Police Force (PMPF) would form a part.

== International relations ==
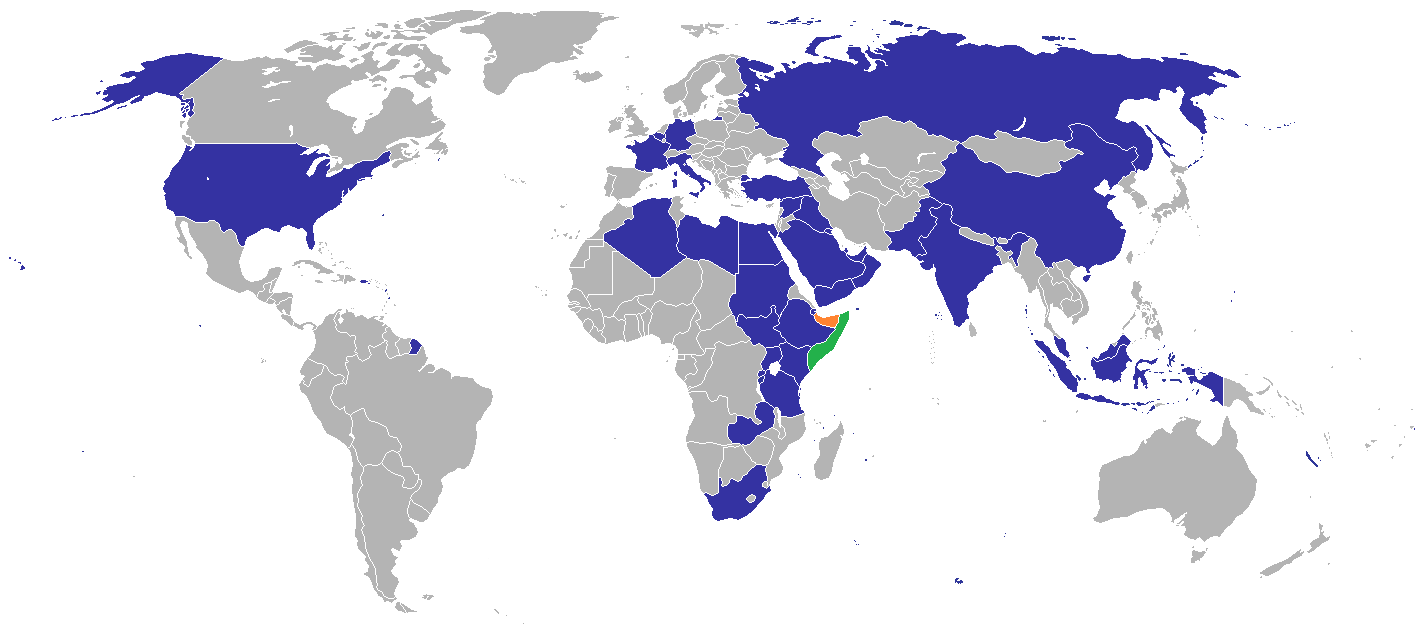
Current diplomatic missions of Somalia

The Transitional Federal Government was internationally recognized as the official government of Somalia. It occupies Somalia's seat in the United Nations, the African Union, and the Organisation of Islamic Cooperation (OIC). From 2005-2016, the Permanent Representative of Somalia to the United Nations was Elmi Ahmed Duale. The Deputy Permanent Representative was Idd Beddel Mohamed. Somalia is one of the founding members of the OIC. The TFG also has ambassadors in other countries.

The European Union was instrumental in the formation of the TFG and provided considerable support to maintain it.

In 2012 the Transitional Federal Government maintained embassies in 34 countries. Ethiopia maintains an embassy in Mogadishu, and consulates in Hargeisa in Somaliland and in Garowe in Puntland. Djibouti re-opened its embassy in Mogadishu in December 2010. The following year, India also re-opened its embassy in the capital after a twenty-year absence, as did Turkey. Italy maintains a special diplomatic delegation and a Technical Mission to Mogadishu, and is scheduled to re-open its embassy in the city. In 2011, the United Kingdom likewise announced plans to re-open its embassy in Mogadishu, with Iran following suit in 2012.

== Corruption and criminality ==
Human rights organizations have documented extensive evidence of serious humanitarian law violations and widespread corruption within the Somali Transitional Federal Government. These groups also criticized European Union support for the TFG, describing it as disastrous.

The TFG’s relationship with humanitarian relief organizations in Somalia was far worse than that of the Islamic Courts Union. Despite lacking administrative capacity, the TFG attempted to control the flow and distribution of aid. During the Ethiopian occupation of Somalia, TFG forces engaged in deliberate blockades of humanitarian assistance, employing tactics ranging from bureaucratic obstacles to physical armed roadblocks. Internally displaced persons were particularly affected, as the TFG accused them of supporting the Islamist insurgency. Aid convoys were frequently looted by TFG personnel, and aid workers faced harassment or being murder.According to Kenyan journalist and UN official Salim Lone, TFG forces, alongside the Ethiopian National Defense Forces (ENDF), deliberately obstructed the delivery of critical humanitarian supplies and food as a means to "terrify and intimidate" civilians perceived to be aligned with the insurgency. During 2007–2008, many humanitarian agencies stopped interacting with the TFG, which they viewed as "little more than predators."
