= Puntland Development Research Center =

Local Non-Governmental Organization

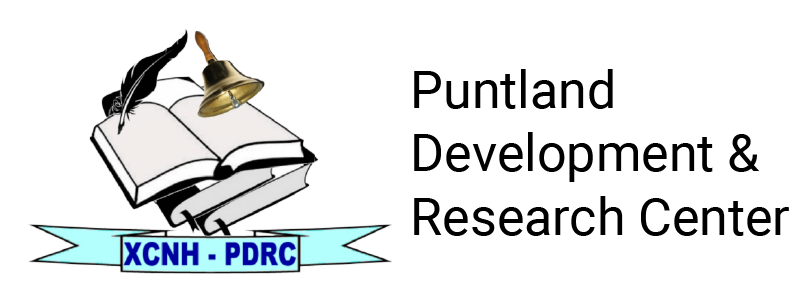
- Founded: October 30, 1999
- Type: Non-governmental organization
- Location: Garowe, Puntland, Somalia
- Region served: Puntland
- Key people: Abdurahman Abdulle Osman (director)
- Website: pdrcsomalia.org

The Puntland Development Research Center (PDRC) is a local non-governmental organization (LNGO) based in Garowe, the administrative capital of the autonomous Puntland region in northeastern Somalia. It plays a key role in research and funding for the development of local peace and effective governance initiatives.

== Profile ==
The PDRC is governed by a board of directors consisting of seven members; five men and two women. It is led by director Abdurahman Abdulle Osman (Shuke).

The center's stated goal is to promote peace-building and national reconstruction following the Somali Civil War and its after-effects. Through dialogue among key national and international actors, the PDRC seeks to encourage democratic values. In the process, it hopes to advance social and economic development by respecting human rights, efficiently utilizing resources and equal treatment of locals.

== History ==
The PDRC was founded on October 30, 1999.

In the past decade, it had made several attempts to improve upon the quality of governance in Puntland. To this end, the center implemented in 2001 the Puntland Peace Mission (PPM), an initiative that sought to resolve differences between the region's then administration and opposition groups. The PDRC also organized peace rallies across the province.

In early 2004, the PDRC also began to emphasize the need for research in areas such as the democratization of Puntland's political system, public revenue management, consolidation of the Mudug peace agreement and national reconciliation. It showed the initiatives that have been made to improve the quality of governance in Somalia. That same year, the PDRC collaborated with the War-torn Societies Project (WSP) in an effort to avoid a power vacuum in Puntland's then political structure.

More recently, the PDRC has continued to play a key role in research and funding for the development of peace and effective governance initiatives in Puntland. According to the PDRC, good governance increases people’s participation in decision-making, enables the decentralization of power from the center to regional and community levels, and allows transparency in decision-making.

In 2016, PDRC changed its name from "Puntland Development Research Center" to "Peace and Development Research Center". The reason is that PDRC plans to expand its presence and work throughout the rest of Somalia. PDRC is in partnership with Interpeace, a Geneva-based, non-profit peace building organization.

== See also ==
- Puntland
