= Kampala Accord =

The Kampala Accord was an agreement made in Kampala, Uganda in line with the Transitional Federal Charter of the Somali Republic to bring an end to the transitional phase of the Transitional Federal Government on 20 August 2011. It was signed on 9 June 2011 by HE Sharif Sheikh Ahmed, President of the Transitional Federal Government, Hon Sharif Hassan Sheikh Aden, Speaker of the Transitional Federal Parliament, H.E. Yoweri Kaguta Museveni, President of the Replublic of Uganda and Dr Augustine Mahiga, Special Representative of the Secretary General of the United Nations.

== Prime Minister Mohamed Farmajo's resignation ==
One of the conditions of the Kampala Accord was that Prime Minister Mohamed Farmajo would resign within 30 days. Announcement of Prime Minister Mohamed's proposed resignation was immediately met with protests in various cities. Thousands of civilians, many government soldiers, and some legislators marched through the streets of Mogadishu, calling for the dismissal of the President, the Parliament Speaker and the Parliament. The crowd also demanded that the Premier be reinstated and described Mohamed as the "only honest leader in recent years".

Attacks on hotels in which members of parliament were staying and at least five deaths were also reported. Additional demonstrations against the Premier's resignation were held in Galkacyo, a key trading city in the north-central Mudug region, as well as in Belet Hawo in the far south.

In response, Prime Minister Farmajo released a statement through the state-run Radio Mogadishu commending the armed forces for their rapid response and urging its troops to exercise restraint. He also appealed to the public to calm down, and indicated that "I have seen your expressions and heard your calls[...] You are part of the decision making — what you want must be heard." Additionally, in a press conference, the Premier called for the immediate release of all protestors who had been detained, and stated that his administration would launch an independent investigation into their arrest. Weighing in on the demonstrations, Mogadishu's Mayor Mohamed Nur suggested that "what [the demonstrators] have a problem with is that two people go and decide the fate of this government without considering the feelings of this population", and that putting the issue before Parliament for approval is a more democratic course of action.

On 11 June 2011, Prime Minister Mohamed released a statement indicating that the Kampala decision ought to be presented in Parliament for debate and appraised according to the laws stipulated in the national constitution. The Premier also stated that he would only step down if lawmakers voted to uphold the accord. This was echoed by the Cabinet, which indicated in a press release that, after having convened to discuss the Kampala decision, the Ministers agreed that the accord must be put before Parliament for evaluation. In addition, over 200 parliamentarians reportedly sought to urge the Prime Minister to reconvene Parliament so as to deliberate the decision, indicating in a separate statement that the accord deprived MPs of their legislative role vis-a-vis the government.

On 12 June 2011, President Sharif Ahmed released a statement wherein he condemned the protests, describing them as "illegal". He also suggested that some government officials were financing the rallies in Mogadishu, and warned that the Al-Shabaab group of Islamists that is waging war against the federal government could try to exploit the gatherings to launch terrorist attacks.

In an interview on 16 June 2011, Undersecretary for Foreign Affairs of Italy, Alfredo Mantica, expressed support for Prime Minister Mohamed's position with regard to the Kampala agreement. Mantica stated that the Italian government believed that the accord ought to be reviewed in Parliament. He also indicated that "the prime minister has been in office five months. And [it is too] early to judge his work. But what he has done so far has been very positive. It has achieved important results. The government already seemed a miracle[...] The strength of the instability in Somalia is a constant. And the prime minister represents stability."

On 19 June 2011, Mohamed Abdullahi Mohamed resigned from his position as Prime Minister of Somalia. Part of the controversial Kampala Accord's conditions, the agreement would also see the mandates of the President, the Parliament Speaker and Deputies extended until August 2012, after which point new elections are to be organized. In his farewell speech, Prime Minister Mohamed indicated that he was stepping down in "the interest of the Somali people and the current situation in Somalia". He also thanked his Cabinet for its efforts in improving the security situation and the standards of governance in the country.

Abdiweli Mohamed Ali, Mohamed's former Minister of Planning and International Cooperation, was appointed as Acting Premier later the same day. A few days later, on 23 June 2011, Ali was named permanent prime minister.

Prime Minister Mohamed's resignation was immediately met with anger by the general public and many lawmakers. Apprehension regarding a possible resurgence of governmental corruption and lassitude, long-standing problems which Mohamed's administration had made significant strides toward eradicating, were cited as primary reasons for the consternation. According to one legislator, many policy-makers are trying to repeal the Kampala decision, as it also "subject[s] the country to trusteeship". Another MP indicated that "lawmakers are united in their opposition to the deal" and "will object [to] it until we throw it away".

Observers have suggested that Mohamed's resignation could offer militants an opportunity to capitalize on the situation and set back the territorial gains made by his administration in the ongoing insurgency in southern Somalia. They have also opined that firing the Premier would not resolve the long-standing power struggle between President Sharif Ahmed and Parliament Speaker Sharif Hassan, but may inadvertently exacerbate and prolong it. Additionally, political analysts have suggested that the Kampala agreement presents other potential long-term issues, such as facilitating intervention and meddling by neighboring countries, with the Ugandan government's role as the final arbiter, in particular, cited as problematic.

Responding to the Kampala decision, the Al-Shabaab insurgent group's head of policy and regions, Sheikh Hussein Ali Fidow, told reporters on 22 June 2011 that the accord ended in failure since it was "an example [of how] the country is managed by Uganda" and that "it is clear for the Somali people and the international community that [the] Kampala meeting [on] Somalia was aimed to coerce the Prime Minister Mohamed Abdullahi Mohamed to step down". In addition, the spokesman suggested that Somalia's citizenry was aware of what was going on and that it did not recognize President Sharif Ahmed and the Parliament Speaker Sharif Hassan as legitimate governmental authorities. He also reiterated his group's call for Ugandan troops to withdraw from the country.

On 24 June 2011, lawmakers reaffirmed their opposition to and intention of repealing the Kampala decision. The Chairman of the federal Information, Public Awareness, Culture and Heritage Committee, Awad Ahmed Ashareh, indicated that 165 legislators had tendered a motion in Parliament opposing the agreement, but the Speaker rebuffed it. Ashareh also stated that MPs would issue a vote of no confidence vis-a-vis the Speaker Hassan if he continued to refuse to permit debate to take place, suggesting that Hassan's refusal "contravenes the Charter and rules of procedure".

Following talks with parliamentarians, President Sharif Ahmed asserted on 28 June 2011 that, on account of opposition amongst legislators to the Kampala decision, the accord would be brought before Parliament for deliberation. He also indicated that the agreement would not be implemented unless approved by lawmakers.
