= El Mergis =

- Town
- Location in Somalia
- Coordinates: 2°0′0″N 41°36′0″E
- Country: Somalia
- Region: Gedo
- Time zone: UTC+3 (EAT)

El Mergis (Af Soomaali Ceel Merjis) is a village located in the southern Gedo region of Somalia - about 258 mi (or 416 km) West of Mogadishu, the seat of the Somali government.

El Mergis is on the west side of the Juba River.

The closest airport is Bardera Airport with a distance of 56.1 mi (or 90.3 km) northeast of the center of El Mergis. There are numerous villages in Bardera District from all around Bardera City and most lay down south towards Anoole and Hareeri east of Juba River while the west side has fewer villages and the main ones are Fafahdhun, El Mergis, and Uar Esgudud.
