= Battle of Gedo =

Battle during the Somali Civil War

- Part of Somali Civil War, Somali Civil War (2009–present)
Date	April 27, 2011 – end of 2012
Location	Gedo, Somalia
Result	TFG, ASWJ victory and Al Shabab withdrawal: Federal Government of Somalia controls 6 districts, Al-Shabaab controls 1

Belligerents
Harakat al-Shabaab Mujahideen	Federal Government of Somalia Ahlu Sunna Waljama'a

Commanders and leaders
Fuad Shangole	Sheikh Hassan Sheikh Ahmed †; Sheikh Mohammed Hussein Al Qadi; Sheikh Is-haq Mursal (Somalia) Diyad Abdi Kalil

Casualties and losses
168+ killed Equipment: 4 military vehicles captured	Total: 81+ KIA: (Somalia) 46+ KIA; 35+ KIA; Equipment: 3 military vehicles destroyed; 2 military vehicles damaged; 6 military vehicles captured
- At least 27 civilians killed At least 380 killed in total
- Based largely on Al-Shabaab claims which were not confirmed

The Battle of Gedo is a conflict of the 2009–present phase of the Somali Civil War. Centered in the region of Gedo, it pits the Somali government and its allies against the al-Qaeda-aligned militant group Al-Shabaab.

== Timeline ==
=== April 27, 2011 ===
The fighting started after Somali forces ambushed Al-Shabaab fighters in Tulo-Barwaqo, near Garbaharey. The spokesman for the Ahlu Sunna Waljama'a paramilitary claimed they killed around 20 fighters from the opposing side. On the road between Elberde and Luuq a roadside mine killed 15 people. The landmine detonated underneath a minibus, killing nine passengers immediately. Six passengers subsequently died from blood loss. In Tulo-Barwaqo, Ahlu Sunna Waljama’a fighters clashed with Al-Shabaab militants an Ahlu Sunna spokesman, reported that Ahlu Sunna fighters captured “assault rifles, pistols, explosive devices and … two military vehicles” and had killed about twenty Al-Shabaab militants. In Luuq, Al-Shabaab attacked Transitional Federal Government troops using hit-and-run tactics, killing four soldiers. In Elwak, Al-Shabaab ambushed government soldiers, killing ten. One military vehicle belonging to Somali military forces was burnt, and two others were damaged by gunshots in the skirmish.

=== April 28, 2011 ===
Some 36 Al-Shabaab fighters were killed after fighting with Somali army in the village of Tulo Barwaqo just outside Garbaharey town. Al-Shabaab launched an ambush attack on Somali forces in Gedo region. Al-Shabaab are said to have ambushed government forces flanked by military vehicles at the village of Kured just outside Luuq District. At least 5 persons, all the combatants, were killed and dozens more injured during the confrontation. 27 gunmen from pro-government Ahlu Sunna Waljama'a group and 8 transitional government troops were killed.

=== April 29, 2011 ===
In Luuq, Al-Shabaab fighters ambushed Somali army forces, killing at least 10 people, mostly from the combatants, and injuring dozens more. A total of 24 Somali forces died and two military vehicles were destroyed that day.

=== April 30, 2011 ===
A clash erupted in the village of Burgadud near Garbaharey when Somali forces launched premeditated attacks on Al-Shabaab fighters, at last 6 government soldiers were wounded. Somali troops and ASWJ forces took over the cities of Tulo Barwaqo and Garbaharey when Al-Shabaab fighters reportedly abandoned the towns. At the same time Al-Shabaab claim victory in these fighting. At least 10 Al-Shabaab fighters were killed during the confrontations and two military vehicles from Ahlu Sunna Waljama'a were reported seized.

=== May 1, 2011 ===
Heavy fighting was still continuing in Gedo. In Af-barwaqo and Burgadud, at least 10 persons were killed and 14 others wounded. The spokesman of Al-Shabaab, Sheikh Abdiaziz abu Mus’ab, said his fighters seized four pick-up cars from government forces including one battle wagon.

=== May 2, 2011 ===
Early in the morning, Al-Shabaab forces launched a failed attack on Garbaharey, and at least 75 Al-Shabaab fighters were killed by Somali troops and ASWJ forces. According to the Somali government, Al-Shabaab high-level commander Fuaad Shongole was killed in these clashes. Only Baardheere and Buur Dhuubo were still in Al-Shabaab's hands.

=== May 3, 2011 ===
Somali troops ambushed Al-Shabaab militias and pushed the insurgents out of a village named Meykaareeb, 19 kilometers west from Garbaharey Government troops killed 15 Al-Shabaab insurgents during these operations and seized two pick-up cars from Al-Shabaab forces. On afternoon Al-Shabaab launched an ambush attack against Somali military killing 8 ASWJ soldiers and at least 10 Al-Shabaab fighters were also killed. In Garbaharey, three persons from one family were killed after a mortar shelling destroyed their home.

=== May 4, 2011 ===
In Garbaharey, at least 70 people, mainly the combatants, were killed in heavy fighting between Al-Shabaab forces and Somali soldiers.

=== May 5, 2011 ===
Sheikh Abdi-aziz Abu Mus’ab claimed that the chairman on ASWJ in Gedo, Sheikh Hassan Sheikh Ahmed (Qoryoley), died from his wounds sustained from an ambush attack in Garbaharey. Sheikh Isaq Hussein, an Ahlu Sunna officer, confirmed the death.

=== May 6, 2011 ===
Nine people (six children and three adults) were killed by a landmine explosion in the Gedo region in an unspecified city.

=== May 7, 2011 ===
Somali forces left the Gusar village following a problem on the payment of their salaries. Al-Shabaab forces took over the village afterwards.

=== May 10, 2011 ===
Witnesses in Beled Haawo, Garbaharey, Ceelwaaq and Luuq saw Somali troops accompanied by ASWJ forces leaving in the early morning and heading to Al-Shabaab strongholds. Later that day Somali forces seized four villages close to Baardheere, Al-Shabaab's biggest and last stronghold in Gedo. Al-Shabaab did not put up a fight and withdrew once they saw that they were outnumbered by Somali Armed Forces.

=== May 13, 2011 ===
Ahlu Sunna Waljama'a forces ambushed Al-Shabaab militias in a village near Garbaharey named Kalabeyr, Al-Shabaab fled the village after ASWJ forces killed 3 Al-Shabaab soldiers and seized some weapons from Al-Shabaab. Ahlu Sunna Waljama'a and Maxamed Xuseen Al-Qaaddi told radio Shabelle that ASWJ forces are controlling Kalabeyr after Al-Shabaab lost the battle.

=== May 14, 2011 ===
In the village of Banmudalo near Luuq clashed beginning between Somali interim government troops and Al-Shabaab fighters. At least two people have been killed.

=== May 15, 2011 ===
Al-Shabaab forces has pounded volleys of mortars to the town of Garbaharey, No deaths or injuries were reported. Some residents started to flee from their home against of back of new more fighting could again renew from the area.

=== June 13, 2011 ===
Almost 1000 Somali troops finished training in Doolow, these troops will be deployed in Gedo resuming the offensive.

=== October 11, 2012 ===
Columns of armoured vehicles and military pick-up trucks carrying fresh Ethiopian troops have reportedly reached Somalia's border town of Luq located in Gedo province. Somali National Army (SNA) commanders in the area say the Ethiopian troops set up military bases on the suburbs of the town, where they are planning major offensive against the remaining towns and locations controlled by al Qaeda-linked militants of Al-Shabaab.

=== October 15, 2012 ===
Al-Shabaab fighters have been reported to making their last preparation to defend Bardera district of Gedo region in southern Somalia from the allied forces led by the Somali Military.

=== October 29, 2012 ===
The government has declared Luq town, Gedo region, and its environment safe and secure and urged aid agencies to open their offices in the area. Area district commissioner Abdullahi Kuredow said security in the district has been bolstered and now reliable. He said Somali forces backed by Ethiopian troops and their allied Ahlu Sunna militias are now in full control of the entire district.

=== November 10, 2012 ===
At least two people have been killed in a fierce battle between Somali National Army (SNA) and Al-Shabaab militants in Gedo province, the latest in surge of attacks in the southwestern region. The violence reportedly erupted after heavily armed Al-Shabaab fighters launched a surprise assault on Somali forces at a checkpoint located on the outskirts of Garbaharey, a town largely controlled by Somali government.

== Aftermath ==
=== January 2, 2013 ===
Reports from Bardhere town of Gedo region indicate the withdrawal of Al-Shabaab leadership from the town Local residents told Bar-kulan that the town is in a state of panic as the Al-Shabaab fighters prepare for an assault from government and allied forces. Among the fleeing leaders are foreigners, the residents told Bar-kulan. Bardhere is remaining stronghold of Al-Shabaab militants. The town is approached by government troops and Kenya Defence Forces.
