= Kurmaan =

- Town
- Location in Somalia
- Coordinates: 2°19′32″N 42°17′09″E
- Country: Somalia
- Region: Gedo
- Time zone: UTC+3 (EAT)

Kurmaan is a town in the Gedo region of Somalia. Located in the southwestern part of the country, the town starts just east of Bardera, with Kurman Creek serving as the dividing line between Bardera and Kurman.

Kurman lies just west of the Bardera Airport, alongside the Juba River. Gedo Regions Highway 3 cuts through Kurman. The next main town on the road towards Sakow of Middle Juba is Anoole village.

== Background ==
Kurmaan was formerly unofficially known as Buulo Kurmaan until the outbreak of the civil war in the 1990s, when its population significantly increased. Local residents use the Bardera main market for everything from groceries, pharmacy and other services such as restaurants.

Kurmaan was for a long time the only housing areas where low-income families could afford housing and land plots for future use. As land prices in other parts of Bardera became more expensive, many families from all parts of Bardera on both banks of the Jubba River started to make homes in Kurmaan. Bardera West area prices for land plots ranged from $6,000 to $10,000 per plot, a range suitable for a family house measuring 20x20 metres. By contrast, the same land plots sizes in Kurmaan village, which were situated about three kilometres from the Bardera city centre, were selling for $1,500 to $4,000 per plot.

== Location ==
Bardera Airport lies just northeast of Kurmaan village, thus making Kurmaan a part of Bardera. Residents of Kurmaan previously considered themselves residents of Bardera, but this self-perception is changing as the town grows in its own right.

== Demographics ==
Some estimates put the town's population at around 7,000 inhabitants. The local population increased in tandem with the rise in development projects.

== Development ==
Since 2006, more services, including schools and madrasahs became available in Kurmaan itself. The local creek now has a footbridge, which serves as an incentive for more people to buy land plots and/or move to Kurmaan altogether.

As schooling services and small markets start to operate in the town, Kurmaan will increasingly look like a settlement independent of Bardera.
