= Hareeri =

- Town
- Location in Somalia
- Coordinates: 1°57′49″N 42°21′17″E
- Country: Somalia
- State: Jubaland
- Region: Gedo
- District: Bardheere District
- Time zone: UTC+3 (EAT)

Hareeri is a small village in Bardera District located in Gedo Region of Somalia. The village of Hareeri lies 7km southeast of Anoole town near the district borders between Diinsoor of Bay Region and Sakow of Middle Juba Region. Hareeri Village coordinates are (2.88 N, 42 E).

== Juba Valley forest area ==
Hareeri is about 30 km from Juba River and it was an army base as it is some distance from farming communities. Hareeri got its name from the hareeri tree which is found in many areas in Gedo region and elsewhere in Somalia.

There are low rise mountain ranges along the eastern Juba Valley starting from Northern Gedo region districts of Dolow and Lugh running along the length of the Juba River and end at Anole north of Hareeri, just before Barrow Diinle, the last main town in Gedo region near the border with Middle Juba.

== Camel grazing ==
Barrow Diinle and Hareeri, and down southeast towards Jilib are the areas where camel herds come for grazing during dry seasons as the Juba Valley forest area is abandoned by animals during the rainy season because of the killer bites (Gosha iyo Gendiga Bites) camels get if they remain in the area during the gu' (April–June) and deyr (October- December) rainy seasons.

When the rains are over and the foraging areas in the mountain areas of Gedo are consumed, the herders take their animals to the forest areas starting at Anole and Barrow Diinle down to Hareeri and all the way to Jilib near the Indian Ocean north of Kismayo.
