= Iskufilan =

- Town
- Location in Somalia.
- Coordinates: 2°44′16″N 42°5′10″E
- Country: Somalia Jubaland
- Region: Gedo
- Time zone: UTC+3 (EAT)

Iskufilan is a small town in the southern Gedo region of Somalia. It is situated between Bardera and El Adde, in the autonomous Jubaland region. It has a primary school and a hospital. The town is settled mainly by the Shirwac Diini subclan of the larger Marehan clan.

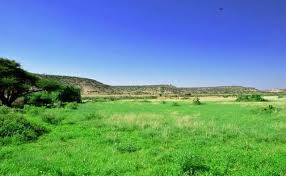
Just outside of Iskufilan town in Gedo region of Somalia
