= University of Gedo =

University in Somalia

- Motto: Your center for excellence
- Type: Public
- Established: 2008; 18 years ago
- Location: Bardera, Gedo, Somalia
- Campus: Urban
- Website: Official website

University of Gedo (Somali: Jaamacada Gedo Arabic: جامعة جدو) is a public university in the city of Bardera situated in the Gedo region of Somalia.

In the past, the higher education system in Somalia was mostly concentrated in the area near Mogadishu, the nation's capital. Since the outbreak of civil war in 1991, there have been local efforts to re-establish educational institutions across the country.

== History and funding ==
The University of Gedo's first campus was opened on August 29, 2008 in Bardera. The Somali Development Foundation (SDF), headed by Professor Warsame Ali, was the force behind its establishment. Thanks to long-running efforts by Professor Warsame and his team who have organized fund-raising drives in more than 50 cities in five continents, the Gedo region is among a half dozen regions in Somalia which have established post-secondary learning spaces for their citizens.

== Campuses ==
The founders envision at least two campuses for the University of Gedo, which will be located in Bardera and Beled Hawo. Another campus will possibly be located in Garbahaarreey, the capital of the Gedo region.

== Curriculum ==
Academic policy is drafted locally. In the meantime, the educational curriculum system will be linked to Coventry University in West Midlands, England in the near future.

The University of Gedo and other institutions of higher learning such as Kismayo University and Bardera Polytechnic are working closely with regional educational funding institutions, educators, parent groups, as well as independent schools with the aim of developing a united and standardized curriculum for primary through secondary schools in the larger Jubba region.

== Faculties and programs ==
First phase programs are:

=== Diplomas ===
- Business Administration
- Nursing
- Islamic Studies

=== Non-credit ===
- Mathematics
- Languages-Somali, Arabic and English
- Computer studies

== Staff ==
- Prof Ali Malaq Ahmed, Chancellor
- Bashir Omar Isse, Vice-Chancellor Academics
- Mohamud Hassan Elmi, Vice-Chancellor Admin and Finance
- Omar Mohamed Abdi
- Omar Sanweyne, Dean of Registrar, Examination and Student Affairs
- Arab Sheikh Don, Dean of Faculty of Science
