= Somali mythology =

Somali mythology covers the beliefs, myths, legends and folk tales circulating in Somali society that were passed down to new generations in a timeline spanning several millennia in Somalia and Djibouti dating back 6000 years ago. Many of the things that constitute monotheistic Somali mythology today are traditions whose accuracy have faded away with time or have been gentrified considerably with the coming of Islam to the Horn of Africa.

The culture of venerating saints and the survival of several religious offices in modern Somalia show that old traditions of the region's ancient past had a significant impact on Somali literature in later centuries. Similarly, practitioners of traditional Somali medicine and astronomy also adhere to remnants of an old cultural belief system that once flourished in Somalia and the wider Horn region.

== Pre-Islamic period ==
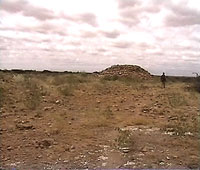
Ancient temple ruins in Aynabo

The Somali people in pre-Islamic times, are believed to have adhered to a complex monotheistic belief system superseded by a single all-powerful figure called in Somali Eebbe but with other names like Waaq. Religious temples dating from antiquity known as Taallo were the centers where important ceremonies were held led by a Wadaad priest. Waaq was said to be a pre-Islamic Sky God associated with water/rain, fertility, sacred trees, animals, nature, peace and harmony. It is construed in Somali with words like Bar waaqo ("bountiful"), Ceel Waaq (a town's name) and Cabud Waaq .

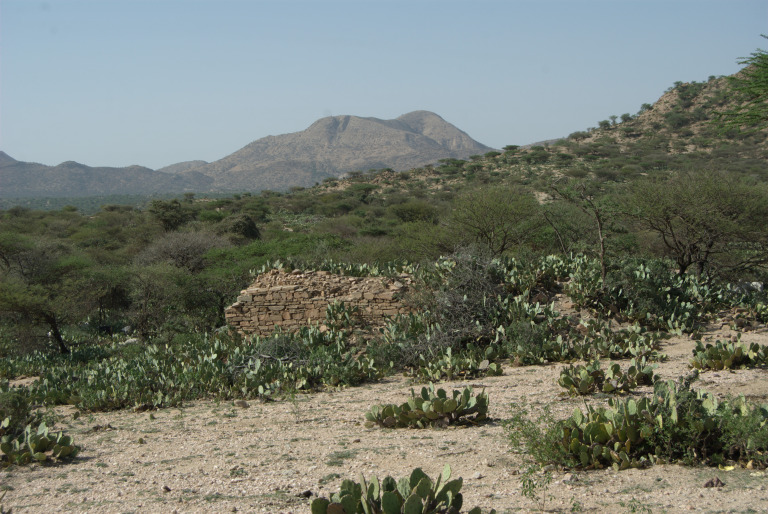
Ruins of an old ancient uninhabited house in Abasa

Richard Francis Burton (1856) describes Abasa in the Awdal Region as home to the Fort of Queen Kola, a powerful Queen who fought with the neighbouring town of Awbube in an ancient conflict, in his book First Footsteps in East Africa:

"After an hour’s ride we turned away from the Abbaso Fiumara and entered a basin among the hills distant about sixteen miles from the Holy Tree. This is the site of Darbiyah Kola — Kola’s Fort — so called from its Galla queen. It is said that this city and its neighbour Aububah fought like certain cats in Kilkenny till both were “eaten up:” the Gadabursi fix the event at the period when their forefathers still inhabited Bulhar on the coast — about 300 years ago. If the date be correct, the substantial ruins have fought a stern fight with time. Remnants of houses cumber the soil, and the carefully built wells are filled with rubbish: the palace was pointed out to me with its walls of stone and clay intersected by layers of woodwork. The mosque is a large roofless building containing twelve square pillars of rude masonry, and the Mihrab, or prayer niche, is denoted by a circular arch of tolerable construction. But the voice of the Muezzin is hushed for ever, and creepers now twine around the ruined fane. The scene was still and dreary as the grave; for a mile and a half in length all was ruins — ruins — ruins."

The term Galla, a derogatory term for the Oromo, was according to Bahrey, 'The Galla came from the west and crossed the river of their country, which is called Galana, to the frontier of Bali.... ' Since the word galana means 'river' in Galla one cannot be definite about which river was meant; it is unclear in which connotation it was used in. The term Galla was used as early as in 1593 in the writings of the monk Bahrey. The term was later misinterpreted and mis-used by European traveller in Somalia with the Somali term 'Taalo' (ancient grave) and the term 'galo' (a non-Muslim). Burton's recount. Taking into consideration the clearly Islamic features of the town and fort complete with ruined mosques and temples, there is evidence to plausibly suggest that Queen Kola could have been an Islamic era Queen. However, in light of the findings from excavations, it is more likely that she belonged to a non-Muslim community that held most of the land between around Adadleh, Jid Ali, Kirit, where many graves with crosses can be found. A clash of two cultures occurred where the Muslim communities which included the ancestors of the Gadaburis, Madaxweyna Dir, Argobba, and Harla drove out a Christian community from the region.

Richard Francis Burton (1856) also describes when he visited the battlefield:

"Thence we proceeded to the battle-field, a broad sheet of sandstone, apparently dinted by the hoofs of mules and horses: on this ground, which, according to my guides, was in olden days soft and yielding, took place the great action between Aububah and Darbiyah Kola."

Abasa and the Fort of Queen Kola was visited by many European travellers, explorers and archaeologists. Amongst them Richard Francis Burton in 1854–1855, Alexander T. Curle in the 1930s, Neville Chittick in 1978 and French scholars François-Xavier Fauvelle-Aymar and Bernard Hirsch in 2004.

== Deities ==
Waaq

(God)

Waaq is the ancient Cushitic Sky God more specific to many tribes. This is not a specific Somali name per se, and according to a Somali legend, Eebbe lived in the Heavens and whenever the nomads successfully prayed for rain, they would seek his indulgence. The name survives in words like barwaaqo, 'living happily'.
Ayaanle (Angels)
The Ayaanle in ancient Somalia were known as the good spirits and acted as mediators between God and humans. They were said to be bringers of luck and blessings.
Huur (Reaper)
Huur was the messenger of Death and had the form of a large bird. He Guided souls to the afterlife.
Nidar (Punisher)
Nidar was the righter of wrong. He was considered the champion of those that were exploited by their fellow humans. The deity has survived in modern Somalia as a popular saying; Nidar Ba Ku Heli ("Nidar will find and punish the ones who are naughty").
Wagar
A woman associated with fertility.

== Legendary kings, queens and saints ==
In Somali mythology, there is an abundance of tales about men and women who defied cultural traditions or acquired heroic and saintly status amongst the masses of the Somali Peninsula.

Queen Kola of Abasa (Queen)	Queen Kola of Abasa was a powerful and legendary Queen from the town of Abasa in the Awdal Region who fought with the neighbouring town of Awbube in an ancient conflict between the towns of Abasa and Awbube.
Arraweelo (Queen)	Queen Arraweelo was a legendary queen, who empowered women's rights. Many epics support the legend of Arraweello as a defining female leader in her era.
Wiilwaal (King)	Wiil Waal was a legendary king in ancient Somalia known for his bravery and skills in battle.

== Giants and demons ==
Habbad ina Kamas

(Giant)

Habbad ina Kamas was a legendary cruel giant who ruled half of ancient Somalia. Habbad's oppressive rule was the complete opposite to the kindness and care that was bestowed upon the other half of the land ruled by the giant Biriir ina Barqo. He was eventually defeated and slain in battle by Biriir, when the latter found out about Habbad's tyranny.
Biriir ina Barqo

(Giant)

Biriir ina Barqo was a legendary heroic giant in ancient Somalia known for his just rule and kindness. He lived in a cave called Shimbiraale (the cave of birds) and used to wear a heavy ring that no man could lift. He answered the pleas of those suffering under the rule of the giant called Habbad and defeated him in battle. He then united the two lands and ushered in a long period of peace.
Qori-ismaris ("One who rubs himself with a stick")
Qori-ismaris was a man who could transform himself into a "Hyena-man" by rubbing himself with a magic stick at nightfall and by repeating this process could return to his human state before dawn.
Dhegdheer ('"One with long ears")
Dhegdheer was a female cannibalistic demon who hunted in Somali forests. Her victims were usually wandering or lost children.
Buuti (shape-shifting human/creature)
Buuti was one of the children of Dhegdheer who risked her life to save the innocent villagers. She turned heroic when she saved the people but was forever cursed to be shape-shifting cannibalistic creature.
Fadumo iyo Farax (The surviving children of Buuti)
Fadumo iyo Farax successfully pass the seven trials and survived the chase of their cannibalistic mother after finding she murdered their father and little sibling. Fadumo iyo Faraxlived isolated life until Fadumo married off as she was never to return.
Coowlay Jajab (continued story of Fadumo iyo Farax)
Farax prayed to have his sister back or be turned into a tree to wait until she comes back since he was of old age so his prayed was answered he was cursed to be tree for years. One day his sister comes back with her family. The children would cut the trees leaf and Farax response "abti eeda" - After Fadumo children keep telling her she cut a leaf and he responded . She made prayer to reverse the curse and they united.

== Mythological places ==
Many regions of Somalia have cities or specific areas whose names corroborate the stories told in Somali mythology. Waaq in itself is a Somali word and are used to name places such as Caabudwaaq ("Worshiper of God"), Ceelwaaq ("Well of God") and other similar towns with the name Waaq. The Tomb of Arrawelo is another popular mythological place in Somalia said to be the final resting place of Queen Arrawelo. In modern times, it is considered an important place for Somali women.

== See also ==
- Waaqeffanna
