= Farah Hussein Sharmarke =

Somali poet

Farah Hussein Sharmarke فارح حسين شر ماركئ
- Born: Faarax Xuseen Sharmaarke; 1926 (age 99–100); Bardera, Somalia
- Education: Sarinley Moalim Sarmaale
- Occupations: poet, philosopher
- Writing career
- Pen name: abwaan Farah
- Subjects: patriotism, faith, mortality
- Notable works: Alif-ka-ya, Nin la Dilay, Bahalaley, Atoor Guunyo, Lix iyo toban haloo deela

Farah Hussein Sharmarke (Somali: Faarax Xuseen Sharmaaarke; Arabic: فارح حسين شر ماركئ) was a Somali poet who composed poems during the 1940s and early 1950s whilst living in Isiolo, Kenya.

== Biography ==
Farah was born in 1926 in the city of Bardera in Gedo region in southwestern Somalia. He studied poetry from other famous Gedo region poets and playwrights including Guled Jufe and Mohamed Nur Shareco.

Farah Hussein became an established poet in the early 1940s. He composed most of his poems in either Bardera, Garbahare, or Isiolo in the NFD region.

=== Quitting Poetry ===
Farah stopped composing poems at the height of his poetic outburst. He composed an often-quoted poem wherein he indicated why he quit, explaining the reason in 16 lines, all starting in the letter D.

Farah Hussein Sharmarke's work is said to include some of the best Somali poems in its classic wisdom form. He is considered to belong to in this category along with great poets such as Haji Aden Ahmed Af-Qalooc and Osman Yusuf Kenadid. Writer Mohamed Sheikh Hassan classifies his work as philosophy and wisdom.

== Works ==
Farah Hussein Sharmarke composed his last poems in 1952 while in Kenya. Voice recorded poems are available for his last half dozen poems just before his death in the early 1950s.

First numbered lines from 1-3 are in Af Somali while lines underneath from 1 to 3 are their English translations.

1- Shimbir duulis badanoow haddaad, degi aqoon weydo

- The bird which is always flying around, not knowing where to land.

2- Mar unbaad libaax labadii daan, dalaq tidhaahdaaye

- Once will land in the mouth of the lion

3- Iney edebtu shay doora tahay, yaan isaga daayey

- For that good behaviour is something important, I have stopped to compose
- Lix iyo Toban Haloo Deela, better known as "Shimbir Duulis badanoow", most referenced line from Farah Hussein Sharmarke's poems.
- Alif-ka-ya
- Nin la Dilay
- Bahalaley
- Atoor Guunyo
