= Uar Esgudud =

- Town
- Location in Somalia
- Coordinates: 1°16′N 41°23′E
- Country: Somalia
- Region: Gedo

Population (2011)
  - Total: 30,000
- Time zone: UTC+3 (EAT)

Uar Esgudud or (Af Soomaali War Caws Gaduud) is a small village in southeast Gedo region in the District of Bardera. The village sits right at the cross-roads of the districts of Bardera, Afmadow and Sakow of the regions Gedo, Lower Juba and Middle Juba, respectively. War Caws Gadudud Village coordinates are Latitide 1° 16' (1.2667°) north; Longitude 41° 23' (41.3833°) east.

Uar Esgudud or War Caws Gaduud is the closest village where the tri-region and districts borders meet. There are no villages near War Caws Gaduud on the side of Lower Juba and Middle Juba regions.

== West Juba River Bore Holes ==
The village is the last populated area where herders going to Jibib grazing areas to pass through from the West of Juba Valley. There are number of Juba River tributaries fed boreholes where animal drink from during the dry season.
