= Dhamasa =

- Town
- Country: Somalia
- Region: Gedo
- Time zone: UTC+3 (EAT)

Dhamasa is a small town in the southwestern Gedo region of Somalia.

== Overview ==
The settlement was founded in the early 1950s by Somali nomads from the larger region. Dhamasa is bordered by Beledhawo, Baardheere and Ceelwaaq.

The town has an estimated population of around 27,000 residents. Its municipal government is led by Mayor Hussein Barre Farah, with Muse Dhaqane serving as Deputy Mayor.
