= Jubaland =

State in Somalia

Jubaland State of Somalia: Maamul-Goboleedka Jubbaland ee Soomaaliya (Somali); ولاية أرض جوبا في الصومال (Arabic)
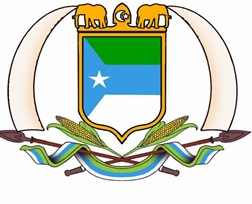
- Flag Coat of arms

- Location of Jubaland
- Capital: Bu'ale (de jure) Kismayo (de facto)
- Largest city: Kismayo
- Official languages: Somali; Arabic
- Demonym: Somali
- Government: Federated presidential state
  - President: Ahmed Mohamed Islam
  - First Vice President: Mohamud Sayid Aden
  - Second Vice President: Suldan Abdulkadir Mohamed Lugadere

Federal Member State within Somalia

Area
  - Total: 110,293 km^{2} (42,584 sq mi)
  - Water (%): negligible

Population
  - 2014 estimate: 3,360,633
- Currency: Somali shilling (SOS)
- Time zone: UTC+3 (EAT)
  - Summer (DST): UTC+3 (not observed)
- Calling code: +252 (Somalia)
- ISO 3166 code: SO
- Internet TLD: .so
- Federal States in Somalia

Jubaland (Somali: Jubbaland; Arabic: جوبالاند; Italian: Oltregiuba), or the Juba Valley (Somali: Dooxada Jubba), is a federal member state in southern Somalia. Its eastern border lies no more than 100 km (60 mi) east of the Jubba River, stretching from Dolow to the Indian Ocean, while its western side flanks the North Eastern Province in Kenya, which was carved out of Jubaland during the colonial period.

Jubaland has a total area of 110,293 km^{2} (42,584 sq mi). As of 2005, it had a total population of 953,045 inhabitants. The largest city is Kismayo, which is situated on the coast. Bardhere, Luuq, and Beled Haawo are the region's other principal settlements. Other cities such as Jamame and Jilib are currently occupied by Al-Shabaab.

During the Middle Ages, the influential Somali Ajuran Sultanate held sway over the territory, followed in turn by the Geledi Sultanate. They were later incorporated into British East Africa. In 1925, Jubaland was ceded to Italy, forming a part of Italian Somaliland. On 1 July 1960, the region, along with the rest of Italian Somaliland and British Somaliland, became part of the independent Somali Republic.

== History ==
During the Middle Ages, the influential Somali Ajuran Empire held sway over the territory now known as Ajuran, followed in turn by the Geledi Sultanate during the early modern period. From 1836 until 1861, parts of Jubaland were nominally claimed by the Sultanate of Muscat (now in Oman).

=== Early modern ===
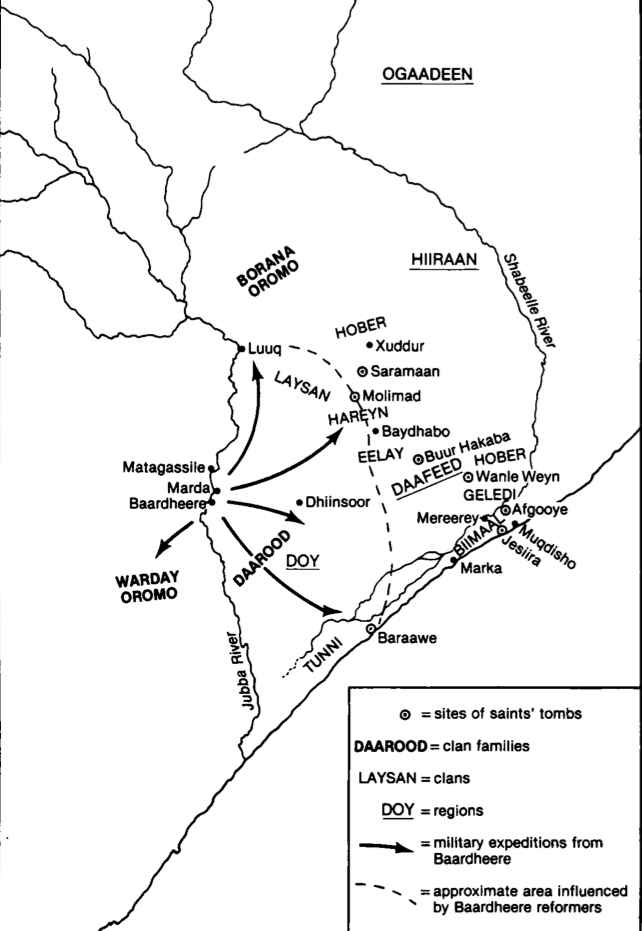
Map of Jubaland and surrounding areas in the 19th century, prior to the Somali reconquest

In 1819–23, Sheikh Ibrahim Hassan and his companions founded the fortified town of Bardheere. In the early 19th century the Sheikh of the town launched a Jihad against the Oromos to reclaim the lands they had taken previously. This would be the start of a reconquest spanning a century, where with the addition of the invading Daroods from the Ogaadeen, Marexan, and Aulihan clans, would ally with the Somalis in NFD, winning numerous campaigns, battles, skirmishes, and victories. Which secured the NFD and Jubaland, restored land which belonged to the Somali clans prior to the Oromo invasions, alongside pushing the Oromos out of southern Somalia, and back towards the Tana river in Kenya.

=== Colonial period ===
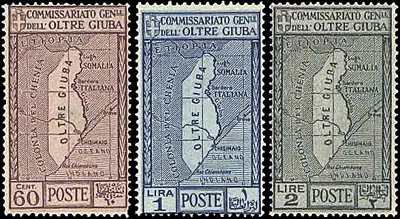
Trans-Juba postage stamps of 1926.

The Geledi Sultanate that controlled this entire region later joined the Italian Somaliland protectorate after the Geledi ruler called Osman Ahmed signed multiple treaties with the colonial Italians.

Jubaland was subsequently ceded to Italy in 1924–25, as a reward for the Italians having joined the Allies in World War I, and had a brief existence as the Italian colony of Trans-Juba (Oltre Giuba) under governor (16 July 1924 – 31 December 1926) Corrado Zoli (1877–1951). Italy issued its first postage stamps for the territory on 29 July 1925, consisting of contemporary Italian stamps overprinted Oltre Giuba (Trans-Juba). Britain retained control of the southern half of the partitioned Jubaland territory, which was later called the Northern Frontier District (NFD).

Britain wanted to give Jubaland to Fascist Italy in exchange for returning the Italian Islands of the Aegean to Greece, but Benito Mussolini's government rejected the quid pro quo. After the Corfu incident, British Prime Minister Ramsay MacDonald decided to cede Jubaland unconditionally to the Italian colonial empire. Jubaland was then incorporated into neighbouring Italian Somaliland on 30 June 1926. The boundary with Kenya was settled by the Jubaland Commission and the Jubaland Boundary Commission.

=== 1974 resettlement ===
During the post-independence period, one particularly significant historical event was the series of internal migrations into the Jubba regions by Somalis from other parts of the country.

Between 1974 and 1975, a major drought referred to as the Abaartii Dabadheer ("The Lingering Drought") affected the northern regions of Somalia. The Soviet Union, which at the time maintained strategic relations with the Siad Barre government, airlifted some 90,000 people from the devastated regions of Hobyo and Caynaba. New small settlements referred to as Danwadaagaha ("Collective Settlements") were then created in the Jubbada Hoose (Lower Jubba) and Jubbada Dhexe (Middle Jubba) regions. The transplanted families were also introduced to farming and fishing techniques, a change from their traditional pastoralist lifestyle of livestock herding.

=== Somali Civil War ===
By the late 1980s, the moral authority of Barre's government had collapsed. Many Somalis had become disillusioned with life under military dictatorship. The government became increasingly totalitarian, and resistance movements, encouraged by Ethiopia, sprang up across the country, eventually leading to the Somali Civil War and Barre's ouster.

Following the ensuing breakdown of central authority, General Mohammed Said Hersi "Morgan", Barre's son-in-law and former Minister of Defence, briefly declared Jubaland independent on 3 September 1998. Political opponents of General Morgan subsequently united as the Allied Somali Forces (ASF), seizing control of Kismayo by June of the following year.

Led by Colonel Barre Adan Shire Hiiraale, the ASF administration renamed itself the Juba Valley Alliance in 2001. On 18 June of that year, an 11-member inter-clan council decided to ally the JVA with the newly forming Transitional Federal Government.

In 2006, the Islamic Courts Union (ICU), an Islamist organization, assumed control of much of Jubaland and other parts of southern Somalia and promptly imposed Sharia law. The Transitional Federal Government sought to re-establish its authority, and, with the assistance of Ethiopian troops, African Union peacekeepers and air support by the United States, managed to drive out the rival ICU and solidify its rule.

The Battle of Ras Kamboni took place on 8 January 2007. Afterwards, the TFG then relocated to Villa Somalia in the capital from its interim location in Baidoa. This marked the first time since the fall of the Siad Barre regime in 1991 that the federal government controlled most of the country.

Following this defeat, the Islamic Courts Union splintered into several different factions. Some of the more radical elements, including Al-Shabaab, regrouped to continue their insurgency against the TFG and oppose the Ethiopian National Defence Force's presence in Somalia. Throughout 2007 and 2008, Al-Shabaab scored military victories, seizing control of key towns and ports in both central and southern Somalia. At the end of 2008, the group had captured Baidoa but not Mogadishu. By January 2009, Al-Shabaab and other militias had managed to force the Ethiopian troops to retreat, leaving behind an under-equipped African Union peacekeeping force to assist the Transitional Federal Government's troops.

=== Revival of the Jubaland administration ===
Following the Kenyan military entry into Somalia in 2011, President of Somalia Sharif Ahmed initially expressed reservations about the deployment of Kenyan troops for what a BBC correspondent suggested was his opposition to the notion of Kenya's involvement in the Jubaland initiative. However, the Somalian and Kenyan governments later jointly issued a communique formally pledging coordinated military, political and diplomatic support for the mission, and specifying that the operation would officially be Somalia-led.

The new president of Somalia, Hassan Sheikh Mohamoud and his government, declared the formation of Jubaland and its process 'unconstitutional' and urged the process to be delayed until the parliament establishes laws and territorial boundaries of proposed regional states within Federal Somalia. This was rejected by the organisers of the Jubaland conference.

Talks aimed at brokering an agreement between the Marehan and Ogaden as well as many smaller clans, began after Operation Linda Nchi started in October 2011. (ICG 2013) On 28 February 2013, more than 500 delegates convened in Kismayo to attend the opening of a conference, which would discuss and plan the proposed formation of Jubaland. A 32-strong technical committee chaired by Ma'alin Mohamed Ibrahim, the deputy of the Raskamboni movement, was established along with several sub-committees whose purpose was to oversee the process. The conference was attended by several high-profile politicians, including Professor Mohamed Abdi Mohamed (Gandhi) and former TFG Prime Minister Omar Abdirashid Ali Sharmarke.

On 2 April 2013, delegates at Kismayo conference were presented with a draft provisional constitution, which they overwhelming approved. On 15 May 2013, an overwhelming majority of 500 delegates elected Ahmed Mohamed Islam (Madobe) as the President of Jubaland.

On 28 August 2013, the autonomous Jubaland administration signed a national reconciliation agreement in Addis Ababa with the Somali federal government. Endorsed by the federal State Minister for the Presidency Farah Abdulkadir on behalf of President Hassan Sheikh Mohamud, the pact was brokered by the Foreign Ministry of Ethiopia and came after protracted bilateral talks. Under the terms of the agreement, Jubaland will be administered for a two-year period by a Juba Interim Administration and led by the region's incumbent president, Ahmed Mohamed Islam. The regional president will serve as the chairperson of a new Executive Council, to which he will appoint three deputies. Management of Kismayo's seaport and airport will also be transferred to the Federal Government after a period of six months, and revenues and resources generated from these infrastructures will be earmarked for Jubaland's service delivery and security sectors as well as local institutional development. The parties agreed to integrate Jubaland's military forces into the Somali National Army, and stipulated that the Juba Interim Administration will command the regional police. UN Special Envoy to Somalia Nicholas Kay hailed the pact as "a breakthrough that unlocks the door for a better future for Somalia," with AUC, UN, EU and IGAD representatives also present at the signing.

On 16 September 2014, President of Somalia Hassan Sheikh Mohamud officially opened a reconciliation conference in Kismayo. The summit was aimed at Jubaland's Lower Juba, Middle Juba and Gedo constituencies, and was attended by delegates from across the nation and abroad.

On 30 December 2014, Jubaland President Ahmed Mohamed Islam (Madobe) and South West State President Sharif Hassan Sheikh Adan signed a 4-point Memorandum of Understanding on federalization, security, the 2016 general elections, trade, and the constitution. The bilateral accord was signed in the presence of representatives from the two regional states, including politicians, traditional leaders and civil society activists. Among the clauses of the accord were equitable allocation of international assistance by the federal authorities, agreeing on pre-civil war boundaries and regional demarcations established by the military government, and recommending that the federal authorities both delegate powers to regional bodies and adopt a No Objection Policy. Additionally, the memorandum stipulates that the two regional states will form a security committee consisting of representatives from both administrations, which will facilitate launching joint counterinsurgency operations, extradition, and expertise and intelligence sharing. The two administrations also proposed the creation of an interstate commission to liaise between the federal government and constituent regional states. They likewise indicated that their respective Chambers of Commerce would buttress commercial exchanges and cross-border trade.

In February 2015, the Interim Juba Administration began a selection process for the members of the new regional parliament. Following consultations with local stakeholders, the lawmakers were slated to be nominated by intellectuals in conjunction with traditional elders. The legislative selection process was drawn from all of the regional state's constituent districts. On 15 April 2015, a new 75-seat chamber of Jubaland parliament was inaugurated at an official ceremony at the presidential palace in Kismayo. Federal lawmaker Sheikh Abdi Yusuf was therein elected as interim speaker, and 75 MPs were sworn into the new regional legislature. On 7 May 2015, an inauguration ceremony was held in Kismayo for the Jubaland administration's first regional parliament. The event was attended by President of Somalia Hassan Sheikh Mohamud, Vice President of Puntland Abdihakim Abdullahi Haji Omar, Foreign Minister of Kenya Amina Mohamed, Foreign Minister of Ethiopia Tedros Adhanom, IGAD Executive Secretary Mahboub Maalim, IGAD Envoy to Somalia Ambassador Mohamed Abdi Afey, and other international representatives.

On 20 May 2015, Jubaland's newly formed regional cabinet had its first reshuffle, with Minister for Water and Mineral Resources Abdinoor Adan transferred to Minister for Information and former Minister for Finance Mohamed Aw-Yussuf filling his previous docket. Former Minister for Information Ibrahim Bajuun was also appointed as the Minister for Finance.

On 25 November 2024, Jubaland's President Madobe was elected to a third term in regional elections. On 28 November, Somalia claimed that the regional election had been held without federal involvement. Somalia and Jubaland issued warrants accusing each other's presidents of treason, and Jubaland suspended relations with the federal government. On 12 December, Somalia pulled its troops out of Jubaland after clashes with local forces, in which Jubaland claimed victory.

== Borders ==
Jubaland has a total border length of approximately 1,500 km (930 miles). This total includes both land borders with neighboring regions and countries, as well as the coastline along the Indian Ocean.

- The northern border, shared with the Southwest State Specially Bay and Bakool regions, is 450 km (280 miles).
- With Kenya: The southwestern border with Kenya, generally following the Jubba River, is about 300 km (190 miles).
- With Ethiopia: The northwestern border with Ethiopia is roughly 200 km (125 miles).
- The eastern border, shared with the Southwest State Specially Lower Shabelle region, is 150 km (93 miles)
- Indian Ocean Coastline: The eastern coastline of Jubaland along the Indian Ocean is about 400 km (250 miles).

=== 2019 conflict at Kenyan border ===
In February 2019, Kenyan officials have alleged that Somalia is engaged in an inappropriate auctioning of drilling rights along the African coast of the Ocean off Jubaland. The International Court of Arbitration has scheduled procedures for September 2019 concerning maritime territorial waters, which Somali sources indicate is being pre-empted by the Kenyan officials. Kenya demanded Somalia to abandon its ICJ case for bilateral discussion. Somalia sees this as delaying tactics as discussion did not produce results between 2009 and 2014. Kenya gave mining rights to France and Italian companies in 2009, however, accused Somalia of doing the same. Somalia denied the accusation. Somalia won the majority of their case off the Jubaland coast on the maritime dispute in 2020 at the ICJ (International Court of Justice).

== Demographics ==
Jubaland has a total population of around 2.5 million inhabitants with the majority hailing from the Somali people.

== Transportation ==
Air transportation in Jubaland is served by a number of airports. These include

The Bardera Airport (IATA: BSY, ICAO: HCMD) is an airport serving Bardera, a city in Jubaland Somalia. The airport resides at an elevation of 550 feet (168 m) above mean sea level. It has one runway designated 15/33 with a compacted sand surface measuring 1,300 by 30 metres (4,265 ft × 98 ft).

Garbaharey Airport (IATA: GBM) is an airport serving Garbaharey in Jubaland. The airport has one runway which is 1,050 metres (3,445 ft) long.

Lugh Ganane Airport (IATA: LGX, ICAO: HCMJ) is an airport serving Luuq, Jubaland, Somalia. The airport has one runway which is 1,120 metres (3,675 ft) long.

Kismayo Airport (IATA: KMU, ICAO: HCMK), also known as Kisimayu Airport, is an airport serving Kismayo in Jubaland Somalia.

The airport resides at an elevation of 49 feet (15 m) above mean sea level. It has one asphalt paved runway designated 05/23 which is 3,688 metres (12,100 ft) long.

== List of the districts in Jubaland ==
List of Jubaland's districts by population
District	Population (2023 Approximations)
Bardere	470,000
Kismayo	630,708
Jamame	104,571
Dolow	101,519
Elwak	151,773
Badhadhe	83,729
Bu'ale	70,209
Baladhawo	100,635
Luuq	286,402
Jilib	121,894
Sakow	45,454
Burdhubo	111,550
Afmadow	109,954
Garbaharey	167,252
Dhobley	41,973
Buraa	58,779
El Adde	55,469

== Society and culture ==
=== Communities ===
Solidarity Group of Jubbaland (SGJ), is a local grassroots development organisation in Jubaland. Death from hunger is a recurrent issue in Jubaland, including in 2017 and 2021. In 2022 Adar Ismail Jurati led a consultative meeting with government officials and people who perform female genital mutilation (FGM) with a view to stopping the practice in the Kismayo area.

=== Culture ===
Local dances of Jubaland include the Saar.

== See also ==
- Jubaland Darawiish
- States and regions of Somalia
- Somalia
