= Kfar Yehezkel =

Kfar Yehezkel: כְּפַר יְחֶזְקֵאל (Hebrew)
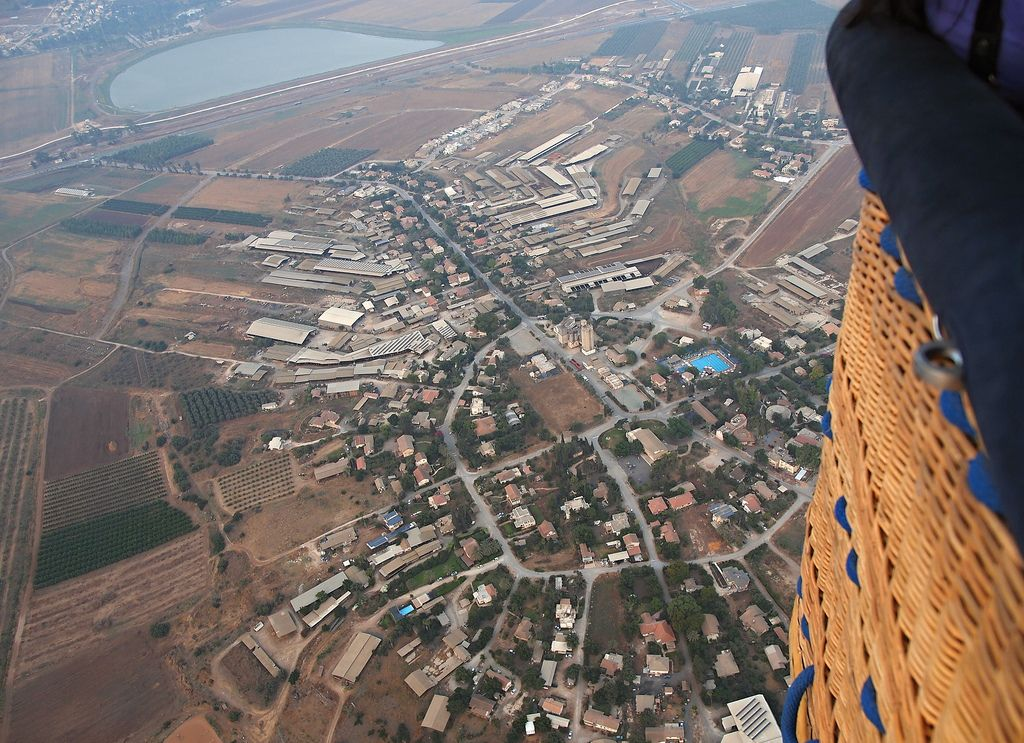
- Kfar Yehezkel seen from a hot air balloon.
- Etymology: Yehezkel Village
- Location within Jezreel Valley region of Israel
- Coordinates: 32°34′2″N 35°21′32″E
- Country: Israel
- District: Northern
- Subdistrict: Jezreel
- Council: Gilboa
- Affiliation: Moshavim Movement
- Founded: 16 December 1921
- Founder: Second Aliyah pioneers
- Population (2024): 1,224

Kfar Yehezkel (Hebrew: כְּפַר יְחֶזְקֵאל, lit. Yehezkel Village) is a moshav in northern Israel. Located in the Jezreel Valley, six kilometres southeast of Afula, it falls under the jurisdiction of Gilboa Regional Council. In 2024 the moshav had a population of 1,224.

== History ==
Kfar Yehezkel was founded on 16 December 1921 by pioneers of the Second Aliyah. Settlers from Tel Hai and Hamara, which was evacuated because of Arab attacks from Lebanon, were also among the founding members. It was the second moshav ovdim in Palestine, after Nahalal.

Originally called Ayn Tib'un after the nearby spring, the early development of the moshav was funded by the partners of E & J S Sykes, a firm of international cotton, tea & opium merchants based in Manchester and Baghdad. E & J S Sykes (established in 1894) was a partnership of four Baghdadi brothers: Ezra Sassoon Sehayik (b. 1860, later known as Ezra Sassoon), Joseph Sassoon Sehayik (b. 1863, from 1888 known as Joseph Sassoon Sykes, naturalised British 1904), Moshi Sassoon Sehayik (b. 1875, later known as Moshi Sassoon Schayek), and Heskel Sassoon Sehayik (b. 1883, naturalised British 1907). In 1910, Heskel Sehayik returned from Manchester to Baghdad and shortly thereafter was drowned whilst swimming in the Tigris River. The proceeds of his life insurance policy were invested in the family business, and in 1923 the three surviving brothers made a substantial donation to the moshav in memory of Heskel, after whom the moshav was renamed.

The driver of the moshav was injured in 1936 during a spate of Arab violence.

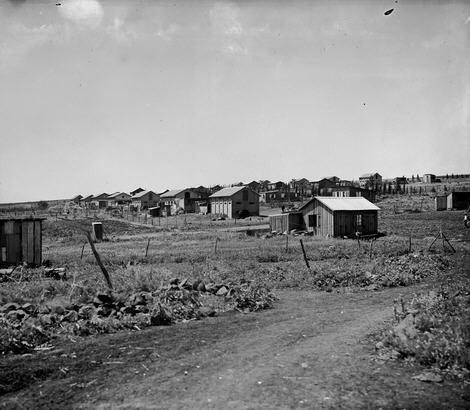
Kfar Yehezkel 1926

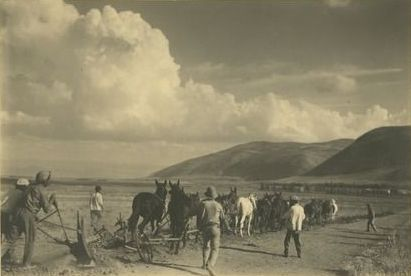
Deep ploughing in Kfar Yehezkel, 1925–1937

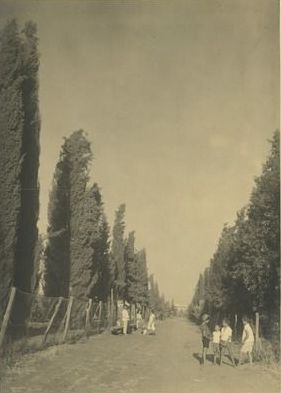
The entrance to Kfar Yehezkel, 1925–1937

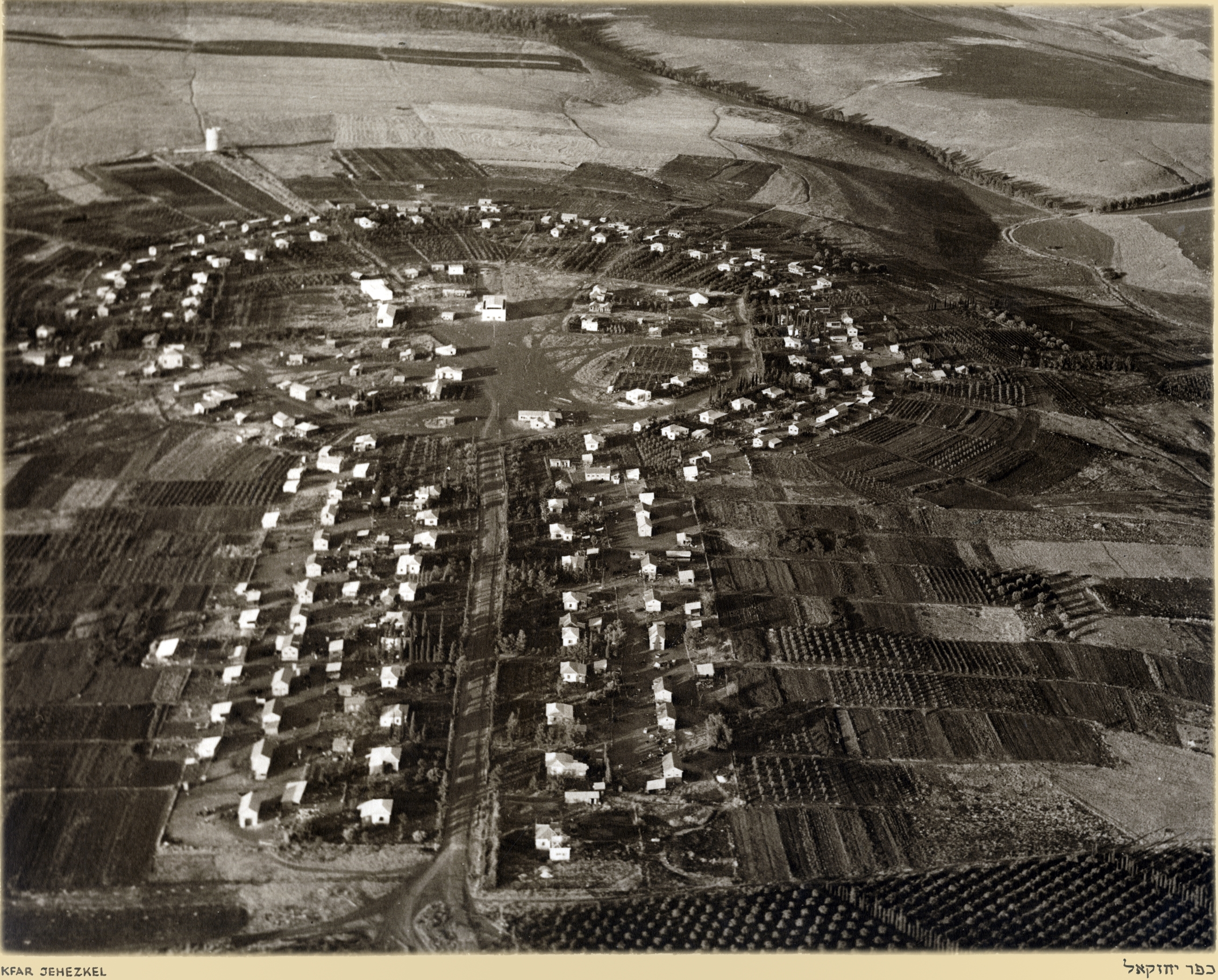
Kfar Yehezkel, 1937–1938

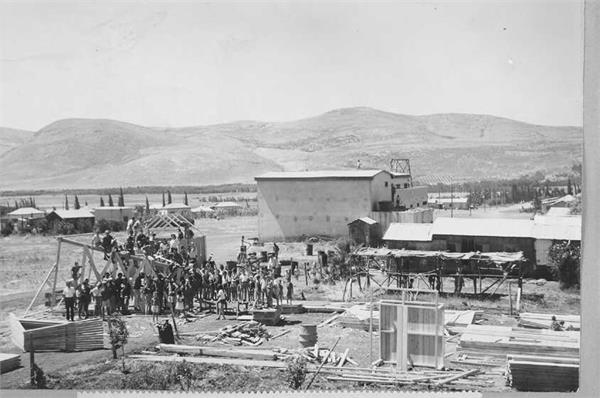
Kfar Yehezkel 1937

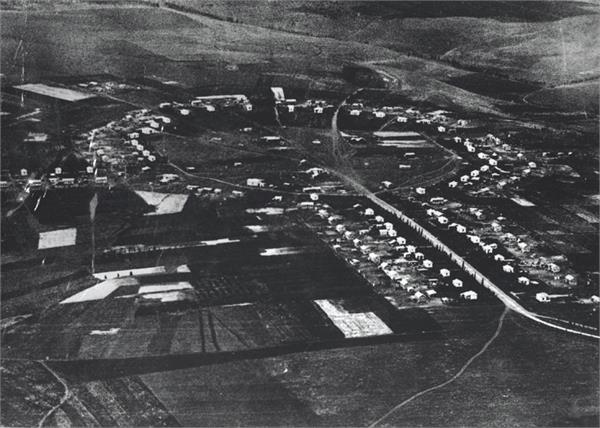
Kfar Yehezkel 1939

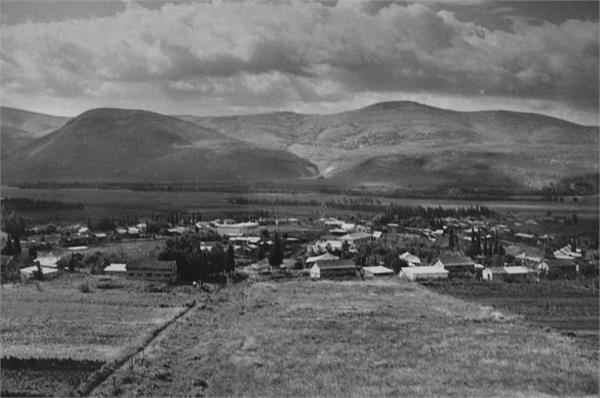
Kfar Yehezkel 1945

== Architectural master plan ==
Kfar Yehezkel's general layout was designed by Richard Kauffmann at about the same time as he drew the plans for the better-known Nahalal settlement. Similarly, it grouped the public buildings at the centre with several residential buildings surrounding them along an inner ring road, with individual plots of agricultural land radiating outwards between straight roads, and additional housing along these roads. The geometrical symmetry of the initial settlement was less stringent than was the case with Nahalal, also due to the semicircular shape of the plateau at the centre of the village.

== Notable residents ==
- Igal Talmi (born 1925), nuclear physicist
- Uzi Feinerman (1924–1975), politician, Member of the Knesset
