= Garbaharey Airport =

Airport in Somalia

Garbaharey Airport Gegada Diyaaradaha Gerbohaareey
- IATA: GBM; ICAO: none

Summary
- Airport type: Public
- Owner: Somali Civil Aviation Authority
- Operator: Garbahaareey
- Serves: Garbahaareey, Somalia
- Elevation AMSL: 755 ft / 230 m
- Coordinates: 03°19′22″N 042°12′47″E

Map
- Location of airport in Somalia

Runways
Direction	Length		Surface
Direction	m	ft	Surface
	1,050	3,445

Garbaharey Airport (IATA: GBM) is an airport serving Garbaharey, the capital city of the Gedo region in Somalia.

== Facilities ==
The airport has one runway which is 1,050 metres (3,445 ft) long.
