= FAAN =

FAAN may refer to:

- Faan value, in mahjong
- Fanweyn (Somali: Faan Weyn), a town in the Gedo region of Somalia
- Federal Airports Authority of Nigeria
- Food Allergy & Anaphylaxis Network
- Fellow of the American Academy of Neurology
- Fellow of the American Academy of Nursing
