= Waaq =

Archaic name for God in Cushitic languages such as Oromo and Somali

Waaq (also Waq or Waaqa) is the name for the sky God in several Cushitic languages, including the Oromo and Somali languages.

== History ==
Waaqa (Oromo pronunciation: [waːkʼa]) means 'God' in the present Oromo language. Other Cushitic languages where the word is still found include Konso Waaqa; Rendille Wax; Bayso Wah or Waa; Daasanach Waag; Hadiyya Waaʔa; Burji Waacʼi.

In the present-day Somali language, the primary name of God is now the Arabic-derived Allaah. The term Waaq survives in proper names and placenames. The Somali clan Jidwaaq (meaning ‘Path of God’) have derived their name from Waaq. Names of towns and villages in Somalia that involve the word Waaq include Ceelwaaq, Caabudwaaq, and Barwaaqo.

Waaq is also a word in Arabic for protector (واق) and occurs in the Quran. Some traditions indicate Waaq to be associated with the Harari region. The Sufi mystic Ibn Arabi mentions in his Al-Futuhat al-Makkiyya that Waaq used to be a generic name for God, in comparison to the Turkic people’s tenets of Tengri.

In Oromo and Somali culture, Waaq, Waaqa or Waaqo was the name of God in their pre-Abrahamic monotheistic faith believed to have been adhered to by Cushitic groups. It was likely brought to the Horn by speakers of the Proto-Cushitic language who arrived from North Sudan in the Neolithic era and may share roots with the Religions of the Book but is not derived from them. The Cushites were similarly among the first people to have practiced circumcision, a central religious rite in the Abrahamic religions. In more recent times, the usage of the term Waaq has mostly declined since the arrival of Christianity to the Horn of Africa.

=== Neo-Pagan Revival ===
In recent years, Waaqeffanna has experienced a steady but niche revival in Somali, Ethiopian, and Kenyan online circles. Most "neo-Waaqists" reject Islam and other Abrahamic religions, instead advocating for a modernized form of Waaqism centered around East African self-determination. Although the movement has been growing online, it remains a minority position among Somali and Ethiopian communities, where Islam and Christianity remain the dominant religions.

Outside of online circles, Neo-Waaqists have a real and genuine presence in Ethiopia. After the fall of the Communist Derg regime in the 1990s, Waaqism gained niche popularity among Oromo nationalists. An organization dedicated to Waaqeffannaa was established in 2002. It received official registration as a legitimate religious movement in Ethiopia back in 2003, but its registration was revoked in 2004.
