= Qooney =

Qooney waa degmo ka tirsan gobolka Gedo. waxayna qiyaasti u jirtaa 55km degmada Luuq dhanka bari.
- Town
- Location in Somalia.
- Coordinates: 4°6′24″N 42°38′59″E
- Country: Somalia
- Region: Gedo
- Time zone: UTC+3 (EAT)

Qooney is a town in the Gedo region of southwest Somalia.
