= Bardera Polytechnic =

Bardera Polytechnic كلية لعلوم التطبيقية بارطيرآ
- Motto: Halaqa, dadaal, iyo abuur "Knowledge in circles, efforts and production"
- Type: Private
- Established: July 6, 2008; 17 years ago
- Chancellor: Dr. Abdirahman Sh. Abdi (2010)
- Vice-Chancellor: Mahad Ali Isse
- Students: 340
- Location: Baardheere, Gedo, Somalia
- Campus: 3 suburban campuses
- Website: Official website

Bardera Polytechnic (Somali: Kuliyada Farsamada Baardheere, Arabic: كلية لعلوم التطبيقية بارطيرآ) is a non-profit tertiary polytechnic education centre located in Bardera, Somalia. The college's full name is Bardera Polytechnic College (BPC). Bardera Polytechnic is the first post-secondary institution in Bardera and the larger Gedo region. Bardera Polytechnic is the first post-civil war vocational training school in southern Somalia.

== Background: Bardera as a center of Islamic study ==
For ages, Bardera was a center of higher learning. Bardera city is famously associated with the study of Islamic jurisprudence, Arabic grammar and syntax. Bardera Islamic centers are famous and students seeking knowledge as well as moalims (teachers) seeking employment used to come here from across Somalia.

For centuries, Sufi students traveled from far distances and from all points on the Horn as a whole. Every Somali who came of age before the 1950s knows the importance of Bardera as a religious education center. Later generations found different kinds of class spaces at Somali National University (SNU), Lafole, Lafole Agricultural College and Sidam, a management training school.

Baardheere: Learning Arabic and tarbiyah

Taking note of the history of Bardera city, Bardera Polytechnic foresees a way of combining the old methods of study in Halaqa Learning in Circles with the new ways of thought forming in the academic settings of an ordinary university or college. Sound Islamic studies are the goals desired by community educators in Bardera and in the region as a whole.

== History ==
BPC was founded in July 2008. This college was established to cover the higher education needs of the Bardera area community, which has been growing since the start of the 1990s. BPC was in the plans for two years before it was established on a rented facility inside the city of Bardera. Bardera Polytechnic's policy is give vocational training, real marketable skills for 16 to 60 age population.

Over the years, there have been a few health and language training schools in Bardera. None offered a structured curriculum. Bardera Polytechnic offers one- to three-year study programs. Certificate and diplomas are granted at Bardera Polytechnic. Ever since the collapse of the education system of Somalia, HIRDA, an NGO based in Bardera and Wisdom College of Languages, a private language training school have nurtured the student population of Bardera.

During the 1980s, the Somali National University (SNU) and its campuses around Mogadishu had over 15,000 students in its student body. Since the collapse of the central education system in Somalia, newly established regional colleges and universities have taken up the task of re-organizing the higher education system in Somalia.

== Campuses and centers ==
Bardera Polytechnic is founded to fulfill the education and training needs of Gedo region's largest district. Supporting the main economic engines of Bardera District is the goal of everyone at Bardera Polytechnic. Keeping this in mind, it was an urgent need to set up institutes and specialised centers to further develop the skills of the community.

Institutes and centers initiated during the first phase are:

1. Jubba Valley Veterinary Institute and
2. Bardera District Agricultural Institute

Jubba Valley Veterinary Institute (JVVI) will work closely with Bardera District Veterinary Center, a district-level authority on animal welfare services. The Bardera District Agricultural Institute will develop mechanisms to help the individual farming persons and farming associations.

=== Jubba Valley Veterinary Institute ===
Bardera Polytechnic's founding of Jubba Valley Veterinary Institute was another major boost for the economic lifeline of Southern Somalia. Herders of the main three livestock types in Somalia, camel, cattle and ari (goats and sheep) will have some help in safeguarding the animals they lose each year to preventable and treatable diseases. All of Jubba Valley, and the Gedo region in particular, has some of the largest livestock headcount in southern Somalia. This new center is on the western side of Bardera city on the road to El Wak. The center functions under directorship of Bardera Polytechnic and its School of Veterinary Medicine.

Before the collapse of the central government in Somalia, herders had an army of helping hands from the central government Ministry of Livestock and Forestry Management. Mashruuca Gosha iyo Gendiga was a Somali central government project which was founded in the early 1970s and it focused on treating and preventing diseases caused by large flies which were infested in Jubba Valley forests. This area of grassing land is used during barbax season (dry season) by camel herders from all neighboring regions such as the two Jubba regions, Gedo, Lower Shabeelle and Bay region. The project was later expanded to all major grassing lands in Somalia.

Veterinary and Agricultural departments of the Somali National University or Jaamacada Ummada had great presence in Bardera. The university used to dispatch team of agricultural and veterinary scientists and their students to help farmers and herders to formulate better management ways. The base for this team was Markableey Hotel, near the Bardera Arc.

=== Bardera District Veterinary Center ===
The center will be established with the help of Bardera Polytechnic. The Gedo region has always been a major producer of livestock and profit-making animal byproducts such as butter, skins and hide. This was evident during the central government rule from independence in 1960 to the overthrow of Somali central government in 1991. Duplication of services will not take place between Bardera District Veterinary Center and volunteer services by Jubba Valley Veterinary Institute from Bardera Polytechnic School of Veterinary Medicine.

The needs of herders for veterinary services is always greater than the services these two institutions will be offering to herders who are always on the move between grasslands on the Jubba River and in the interior of Jubba Valley regions. Observations of disease presence in animals, inoculations, veterinary medicine with minimal fees and advice to herders are some of the services Bardera Polytechnic offers to herders in the region. The school is conducting fundraising activities for money to buy one basic vehicle to transport technicians into the fields.

Currently, herders in southern Somalia and those in North Eastern Province of Kenya are suffering greatly, especially with the droughts in the last few years (such as the major droughts of 2005 and 2008). Animals travel great distances to find water and lands suitable for grazing. Desperate herders cross international boundaries between Somalia and Kenya. Any herds carrying local diseases could have devastating effects on host animals. It's essential to have joint efforts for information sharing and awareness between institutes and centers dealing with the welfare of these communities. Animals near Jubba River around Bardera, Dolow or Kismayo could reach far distances and go as far as Tana River, such areas as Garissa or vice versa.

=== Juba Valley Agricultural Institute ===
Another center aimed at developing the economy of the region and furthering the skills of the community is Juba Valley Agricultural Institute. Somali farmers have been going and growing without technical support from any government for the longest time, and now the college system is formulating joint collaborations between farming associations and the Bardera Polytechnic Agricultural Department in the field of Agricultural Science.

Juba Valley Agricultural Institute (Italian: Juba Valle Istituto Agrario) is part of the college system and the focus is developing the economic sectors of the district and region which was neglected for close to two decades. To show the strength of the farming sector in Bardera, 95% of Bardera households are able to buy their food stuff . This indicates little technical help will yield even greater results of economic empowerment for the larger community. The Dean (Hormuud) of Bardera Polytechnic University, Mohamed Abdullahi Barre, is also the head of this department until suitable person is found.

== Departments ==
School year for 2008–2009, Bardera Polytechnic has the following Departments and Schools with varying degrees of development.

1. Department of Agricultural Sciences
2. Department of Computer Studies and IT
3. Department of Islamic Studies
4. College of Veterinary Medicine
5. School of Public Health
6. School of Business and Management
7. School of Languages
8. Department of Adult Continuing Education and Skills Training

Second phase initiative include the establishment of the following programs and/or centers at the earliest feasible time.

1. College of Medicine
2. School of Nursing
3. Department of Environment and Forestry Management
4. Center for Peace and Community Development

== Programs ==
The initial phase programs at BPU include:

1. Arabic and Islamic Sharia
2. Public Health Sciences
3. Agricultural Sciences
4. Livestock and Forestery Management
5. Computer Sciences
6. Business and Management
7. School of Languages

== College skills training centers ==
In addition, the school has two collaborating centers dealing with Adult Continuing Education Centre and Public (government) Services Training Center. Bardera Polytechnic College is planned to play a role in the education and economic development of Gedo region's largest district. Skills requiring one to two-year schooling will further enhance the economic opportunities of this farming community. Top three most needed skills in Bardera region are related in the areas of health (including veterinary), agriculture and construction.

Bardera District has sizable farming population. There are over 90 towns and villages in Bardera District. Only Bardera, Sarinley, Dar and Fafahdhun have any schooling as of 2007. Aside from agricultural and livestock management courses, Bardera Polytechnic will train students in other programs where short-term skills training is the goal. There are internship programs in the following fields which range in training period from 6 months to one year:

1. Auto mechanic
2. Welding
3. Woodworking
4. Electric Technician and
5. Construction

Initial enrollment was limited to 80 students who have either completed high school in previous years and or those who are mature adults who have had work experience relating to their interested fields of study. Some 30 students for continuing education were registered at the beginning of 2008–2009 school year as well.

Bardera Polytechnic intends to fill the great need for educated citizens in the Jubba Regions and beyond. Similarly, Bardera Polytechnic plans to include its student body fast numbers of girls, as women have taken many leading roles at community services which have supported the betterment of the Somali people ever since the collapse of the central government. Women run many businesses and organizations in Somalia. Hospitals in Hargeisa, Bardera, Mogadishu, Kismayo, Belet Weyn and other large cities in Somalia currently employ mostly or exclusively female nurses, pharmacists, administrators and medical technicians as there are no trained doctors present in the country.

== Female contributions ==
Somali female doctors and nurses are increasingly taking leadership roles at health centers throughout Somalia whether in the north, central or south. Dr. Hawa Abdi Dhiblawe is famous for simply being there for the greatly suffering people of Mogadishu. Another example is work done by a former nurse, Edna Adan, who established Edna Adan Maternity Hospital and with great success. A third such example brings us back to Bardera, two successive administrators of East Bardera Hospital were women. Nurse Lul Abdullahi Barre and the woman who succeeded her is Nurse Fardowsa Abdinur Hashi.

Keeping this in mind, Bardera Polytechnic plans to recruit women and girls for all programs including administrative and training positions. Summer intake period which falls onto February–March will include 40 women out of 60 spaces available for various medical training programs.

== Pharmacy education ==
Bardera Polytechnic's Pharmacy Program offers three-year pharmacy degree. The pharmacy program has ethics training in its core curriculum. Private pharmacies in Somalia have been operating in an industry that lacked an important factor, self-discipline.

Horror stories told by countless people in Somalia for the last two decades, caused BPC to design the current pharmacy program and the objective being to return the community and hospital pharmacies, the good position they used to be.

All other medical programs at Bardera Polytechnic emphasize the importance of ethics in all aspects of business activities, whether dealing with private entities or non-for-profit institutions that carry out public services.

== Gedo Region Education Development Centre at Bardera Polytechnic ==
As there is no functioning ministry of education in Somalia, Bardera Polytechnic administration and supporters created regional curicullum office to further the standards and operations for schools currently in operation in the region from Balad Hawo to Bardera.

The first general meeting for all concerned will be held on September 22, 2010. Expected participants include administrators, principals and school board members from HIRDA, SEHO, University of Gedo and Markabley Educational Foundation. Also invited are individual educators, governmental agencies and all other interested parties from Gedo and surrounding regions. Gedo Education Committee (GEC) leader Ahmed Abdirahman Kaynan was the lead expert in 2010 gathering.
