= Geedweyne =

- Town
- Location in Somalia.
- Coordinates: 4°1′49″N 42°17′48″E
- Country: Somalia
- Region: Gedo
- Time zone: UTC+3 (EAT)

Geedweyne is a town in the southwestern Gedo region of Somalia.
