= Banaaney =

- Town
- Location in Somalia
- Coordinates: 3°51′12″N 42°32′39″E
- Country: Somalia
- Region: Gedo
- Time zone: UTC+3 (EAT)

Banaaney is a town in the southeastern Gedo region of Somalia.
