= Hussein Farey =

Governor of Gedo

Governor of Gedo
- In office 2008–incumbent
- President: Hassan Sheikh Mohamud
- Prime Minister: Omar Sharmarke

Personal details
- Born: Somalia
- Party: Independent

Hussein Farey was the first democratically elected governor of the Gedo administrative region. His election was a part of a grassroots effort, and he was inaugurated into office in 2008.
