= El Wak District =

ceel waaq
- District
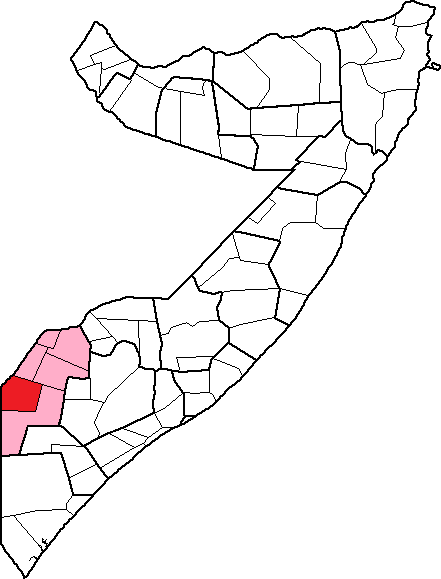
- Country: Somalia
- Region: Gedo
- Capital: El Wak
- Time zone: UTC+3 (EAT)

El Wak District (Somali: Degmada Ceel Waaq) is a district in the southwestern Gedo region of Somalia. Its capital is El Wak.

The district has suffered from Marehan-Garre tensions over political control, driven by competition over El Wak town. Even between guri (indigenous) Marehan factions there were tensions in mid-2012 over apportionment of parliamentary seats.

In 2012, the following political and military discord was underway in the district:

- Ongoing conflict between the Somali National Army and Kenya Army/AMISOM against Al Shabaab
- Resource conflict between the Garre and the Marehan's Ali Dhere
- Conflict over land between the Urmidig and the Reer Yusuf (Marehan), although peace efforts were underway
- Disagreements over the distribution of relief aid, between the community, non-governmental organisations, and the former-Transitional Federal Government local administration. Resolution efforts were underway but had not been successful.
