= Gantama =

Coordinates: 2°25′N 41°49′E

- Village
- Interactive map of Gantama
- Country: Somalia
- Region: Gedo
- Time zone: UTC+3 (EAT)

Gantama is a village in the southwestern Gedo region of Somalia.
