= Dheenle =

- Town
- Location in Somalia
- Coordinates: 2°36′0″N 42°6′0″E
- Country: Somalia
- Region: Gedo
- Time zone: UTC+3 (EAT)

Dheenle is a town in the southwestern Gedo region of Somalia.
