= Ali Shire Warsame =

Somali politician

Ali Shire Warsame (Somali: Cali Shire Warsame), (? in Galgaduud, Somalia – 1999 in Somalia), was a Somali politician, general surgeon and a famed businessman. He was the MP of SYL in the 1960s representing DhuusaMareeb. After the birth of the Revolutionary Government, he returned to his business pursuits until the collapse of the central government. He was the mastermind of Marehan's future capture of Kismayo in 1991, finding his nephew Col Barre Adan Shire Hiiraale and long-time friend Gen Ahmed Warsame in a café in Bardera, it was this one-hour meeting that produced Siad Barre's never-ending pursuit of the port city of Kismayo.
