= Uunsi =

- Town
- Country: Somalia
- Region: Gedo
- Time zone: UTC+3 (EAT)

Uunsi is a town in the southwestern Gedo region of Somalia. it is commonly known as Uunsi weyn, meaning the big incense. The town got its name from the main economic activity of the Somali people in that region; which is to sell burning incense.
