= Fafahdun =

Fafahdun Faafaxdhuun
- Town
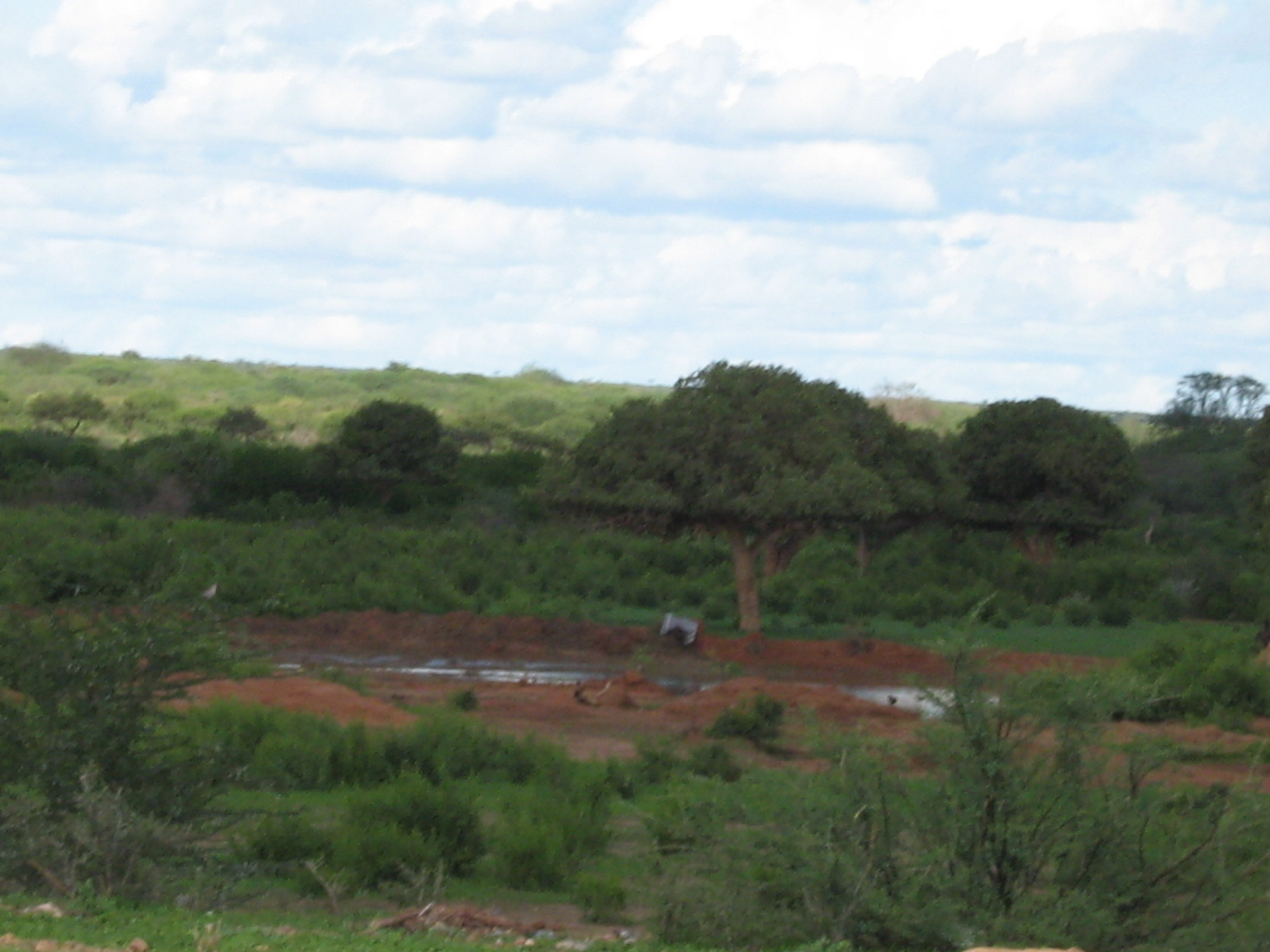
- A pond in Fafahdun.

- Location in Somalia.
- Coordinates: 2°13′0″N 41°37′0″E
- Country: Somalia
- Region: Gedo

Government
  - Occupation: Ayatollah
- Time zone: UTC+3 (EAT)

Fafahdun (Somali: Faafaxdhuun) is a town in the southwestern Gedo region of Somalia in the district of Bardera.
