= Shatolow =

- Town
- Country: Somalia
- Region: Gedo
- Time zone: UTC+3 (EAT)

Shatolow is a town in the southwestern Gedo region of Somalia.
