= Bilcisha =

- Populated Locality
- Location in Somalia.
- Coordinates: 2°2′41″N 42°21′2″E
- Country: Somalia
- Region: Gedo
- Time zone: UTC+3 (EAT)

Bilcisha is a populated area in the southwestern Gedo region of Somalia.
