= Buusaar =

- Town
- Location in Somalia.
- Coordinates: 2°40′20″N 41°19′21″E
- Country: Somalia
- Region: Gedo

Population (2011)
  - Total: 45,533
- Time zone: UTC+3 (EAT)

Buusaar is a town in the southwestern Gedo region of Somalia.
