= Geriley =

- Town
- Country: Somalia
- Region: Gedo
- Time zone: UTC+3 (EAT)

Geriley (Somali: Gerileey) is a small town in the southwestern Gedo region of Somalia.

== Overview ==
The town originally acquired its name Geriley from the abundant local wildlife; in particular, giraffes ("geri" in the Somali language).

Geriley is situated near Somalia's border with the North Eastern Province,10 km (6.2 mi) north of Wajir.
