= Fanweyn =

- Town
- Country: Somalia
- Region: Gedo
- District: Baardheere
- Time zone: UTC+3 (EAT)

Fanweyn (Somali: Faan Weyn) is a town in the southwestern Gedo region of Somalia, located in the Baardheere District.
