= Sidimo =

- Town
- Location in Somalia.
- Coordinates: 2°27′N 41°58′E
- Country: Somalia
- Region: Gedo
- Time zone: UTC+3 (EAT)

Sidimo (Somali: Siidimo), alternatively Siidamo, is a town in the southwestern Gedo region of Somalia.
