= Malmaley =

- Town
- Country: Somalia
- Region: Gedo
- Time zone: UTC+3 (EAT)

Malmaley is a town in the southwestern Gedo region of Somalia. It is located in the Dolow District.
