= Caracase =

- Town
- Location in Somalia.
- Coordinates: 3°45′12″N 42°32′39″E
- Country: Somalia
- Region: Gedo

Population (2012)
  - Total: 89,345
- Time zone: UTC+3 (EAT)

Caracase is a town in the southwestern Gedo region of Somalia.
