= Barwaaqo =

Town in Jubaland, Somalia

Tulo Barwaaqo
- Town
- Location in Somalia.
- Coordinates: 03°30′9″N 42°9′12″E
- Country: Somalia
- Regional State: Jubaland
- Region: Gedo
- District: Garbaharey
- Time zone: UTC+3 (EAT)

Barwaaqo is a small town in the southwestern Gedo region of Somalia.
