= Buraa =

- Town
- Nickname: GolJano
- Location Jubaland State of Somalia.
- Coordinates: 03°10′20″N 42°08′28″E
- Country: Somalia

Population (2010)estimated
  - Total: 57,000
- Time zone: UTC+3 (EAT)
- Area code: +252

Buraa is a town in the southwestern Gedo region of Somalia.
