= Hamara =

- Town
- Country: Somalia
- Region: Gedo
- Time zone: UTC+3 (EAT)

Hamara (Somali: Xamara) is a town in the southwestern Gedo region of Somalia. It is also known for having hot weather
