= Bardera Airport =

Airport in Gedo, Somalia

- IATA: BSY; ICAO: HCMD

Summary
- Airport type: Public
- Owner: Somali Civil Aviation Authority
- Serves: Bardera, Somalia
- Elevation AMSL: 550 ft / 168 m
- Coordinates: 02°20.203′N 042°18.462′E

Map
- Location of the airport in Somalia

Runways
Direction	Length		Surface
Direction	m	ft	Surface
15/33	1,300	4,265	Sand

Bardera Airport (IATA: BSY, ICAO: HCMD) is an airport serving Bardera, a city in the southern Gedo region in Somalia.

== Facilities ==
The airport resides at an elevation of 550 feet (168 m) above mean sea level. It has one runway designated 15/33 with a compacted sand surface measuring 1,300 by 30 metres (4,265 ft × 98 ft).
