= Garbaharey District =

Garbaharey
- District
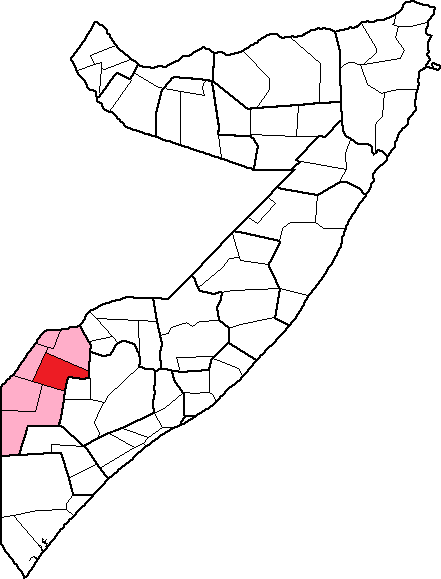
- Country: Somalia
- Region: Gedo
- Capital: Garbaharey

Population (2012)
  - Total: 386,324
- Time zone: UTC+3 (EAT)

Garbaharey District (Somali: Degmada Garbahaarey) is a district in the southwestern Gedo region of Somalia. Its capital is Garbahare.

== Demographics ==
The district is predominantly inhabited by the Reer Amir Nuur sub-clan of the Marehan tribe. It served as a base for Siad Barre, the former President of Somalia, following his expulsion from Mogadishu in January 1991. A stream along the town's edge swells during the rainy season, occasionally disrupting transportation in and out of the town.
