= Lo Gaduud =

- Town
- Location in Somalia.
- Coordinates: 2°56′56″N 43°41′31″E
- Country: Somalia
- Region: Bay
- Time zone: UTC+3 (EAT)

Lo Gaduud is a town in the southern Bay region of Somalia.
