= El Wak, Somalia =

El Wak
- Town
- Location in Somalia
- Coordinates: 02°47′35″N 41°0′42″E
- Country: Somalia
- Regional State: Jubaland
- Region: Gedo
- District: El Wak
- Time zone: UTC+3 (EAT)

El Wak (Somali: Ceelwaaq) is a town located in the southwestern Gedo region of Jubaland. Situated by the Somalia-Kenya border, it is 9 km away from El Wak, Kenya and just 4 km away from the international border. It is the seat of one of the region's seven districts.

== Etymology ==
The place name Ceelwaaq literally translates as 'God's well'. In the Afro-Asiatic Somali language, the word ceel means 'well', and waaq is an archaic Somali term for 'God'.

== Location ==
El Wak is situated in the El Wak District. It is bordered by the Bardera and Garbaharey districts on the east, and the Somali-inhabited North Eastern Province to the west.
