= Garbahare =

Garbaharey Garbiharey
- City
- Nickname: Garbo
- Motto: "Gacmo wadajir bay wax ku gooyaan"
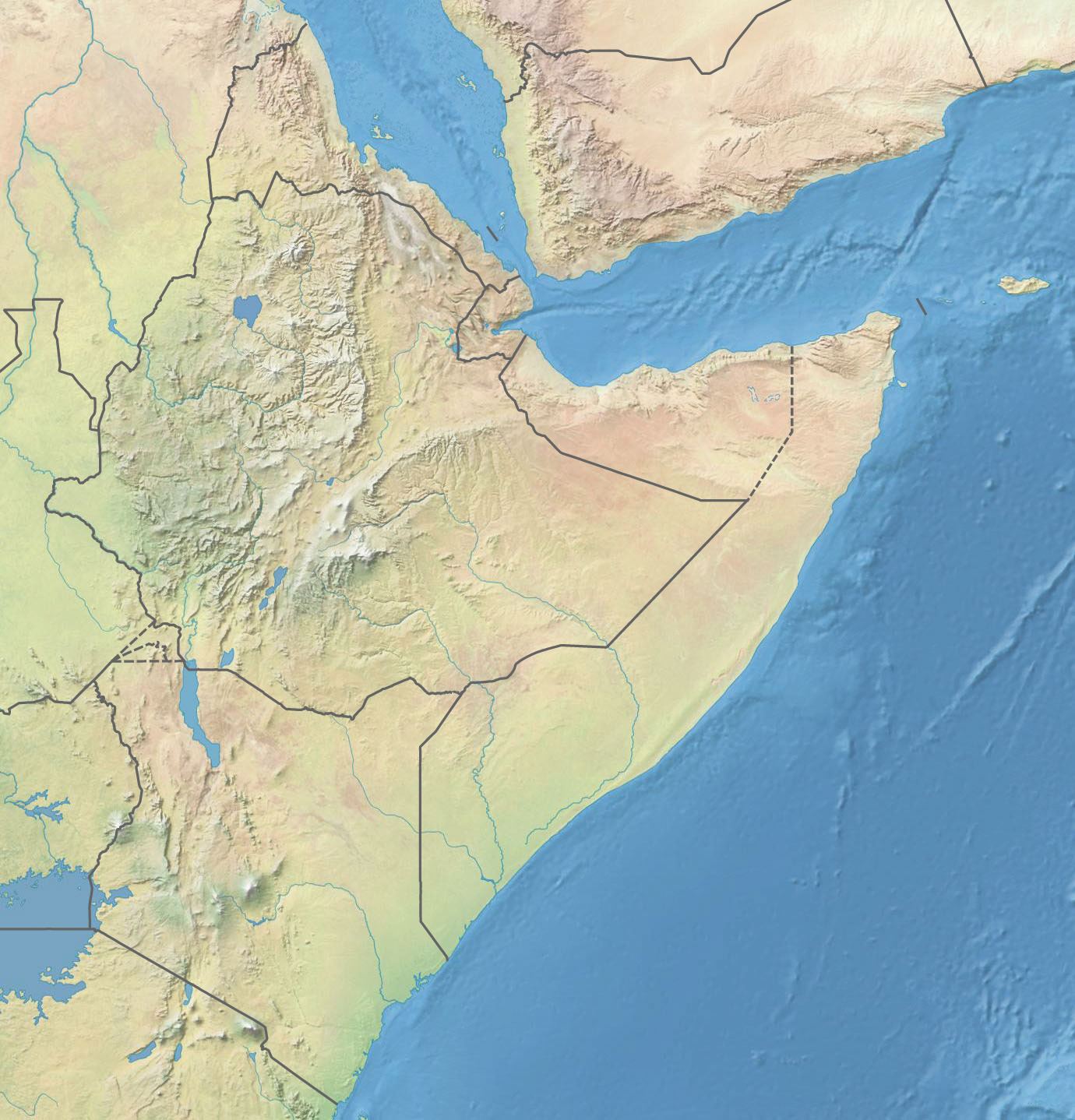
- Location within Somalia Location within the Horn of Africa Location within Africa
- Coordinates: 3°21′N 42°16′E
- Country: Somalia
- State: Jubaland
- Region: Gedo

Government

Population (2015)
  - Total: 286,324
- Time zone: UTC+3 (East Africa Time)
- Area code: +252

Garbaharey (also: Garbahare) (Somali: Garbaharey, Maay: Garbiharey, Arabic: جربهاري) is the capital of Gedo, an administrative region in southern Somalia. It is the third most populous city in the Gedo region after Bardera and Luuq.

== History ==
Relation map.
Bu=Burguduud, El=El Wak, Ga=Garbaharey, Tu=Tulo Barwaaqo

During the Middle Ages, Garbaharey and its surrounding area were part of the Ajuran Empire that governed much of southern Somalia and eastern Ethiopia, with its domain extending from Hobyo in the north, to Qelafo in the west, and Kismayo in the south.

In the early modern period, the Garbaharey area was ruled by the Geledi Sultanate. The kingdom was eventually incorporated into the Italian Somaliland protectorate in 1910 after the death of its last Sultan Osman Ahmed in 1910. After independence in 1960, the city became the capital of Gedo region.

=== Control by the SNF ===
In June 1995, a meeting was held in Garbaharey attended by staff from the Dutch Embassy in Nairobi and diplomats from other Western countries.

As of August 1996, it served as the headquarters of the Somali National Front (SNF). However, at that time, the group’s leader, Omar Haji Mohamed, had been held responsible for civilian casualties and was unable to return to Garbaharey. The Islamic militant group Al-Itihaad al-Islamiya attacked Garbaharey but failed to capture it. The Marehan, a sub-clan of the Darod, ruled the region.

During the floods of October–November 1997, while the runways in the middle and lower reaches of the Juba River were unlandable, the runways at Garbaharey remained landable. ACT Alliance/Norwegian Church Aid (NCA) distributed relief supplies to Garbaharey, including 5 metric tons of rice, 2 metric tons of sugar, 2 metric tons of cooking oil, 40 rolls of plastic sheeting, 1,000 blankets, and 200 sets of cooking utensils.

In December 1997, 49 metric tons of relief supplies were delivered to Garbaharey through three airdrops carried out by a C-130 transport aircraft based in Mombasa, Kenya.

As of March 1998, an outbreak of cholera had been confirmed. The road from Bardere to Garbaharey was deemed impassable due to newly planted landmines.

During the 1998 battle of Kismayo, the SNF deployed more than 300 fighters from Garbaharey.

In September 1998, a leader of the Al-Itihad Islamic organization was killed in Garbaharey. The perpetrator was arrested by the SNF administration.

In February 2000, a CARE field worker involved in food distribution was shot and wounded in northern Garbaharey, prompting CARE to temporarily suspend food distribution in the area.

In September 2000, due to tension at the airstrip, a United Nations Common Air Service (UNCAS) aircraft was unable to land at the Garbaharey airstrip.

By early 2001, Garbaharey came under the control of the Transitional National Government. All activities shifted to Luuq and Beled Haawo, and Garbaharey had a new role in the region. Neighboring regions such as NFD welcomed the new leadership, as a safer Gedo is also good for the neighboring regions in Kenya and Ethiopia.

In May 2002, as part of a clan conflict, a militia attacked and seized control of the town of Garbaharey, leaving four people dead.

In April 2003, a water supply project led by UNICEF entered its final phase.

As of November 2005, Garbaharey was the only district in Gedo where security conditions had improved enough to allow the resumption of United Nations air and ground operations.

In August 2006, the United Nations field office in Garbaharey received several threats warning of the downing of United Nations Common Air Service (UNCAS) aircraft and the kidnapping of United Nations staff. Furthermore, a shooting incident occurred at the Garbaharey airstrip while a Real-Time Evaluation of the drought response was being conducted. In response to the aforementioned threats and the shooting incident, the United Nations Department for Safety and Security (UNDSS) closed the Garbaharey airstrip to all international and local staff until further notice.

In March 2007, 25 trucks loaded with food from the World Food Program (WFP) crossed the border at El Wak and arrived in Garbaharey.

=== Fight against al-Shabaab ===
In January 2009, the Ethiopian military re-entered Gedo and forced al-Shabaab to withdraw from Garbaharey, Beled Hawo, and other areas.

In January 2009, a World Food Program (WFP) staff member was shot and killed by three masked gunmen in Yubsan Village, Garbaharey. Additionally, the Garbaharey district commissioner of the Transitional Federal Government (TFG) was killed, along with three other officials traveling with him, when a landmine exploded on the road between Beled Hawo and Garbaharey.

In January 2010, al-Shabaab announced the establishment of a new Islamic administration in the Garbaharey district.

In April 2011, al-Shabab lost control of Garbaharey following fighting with a joint force of Somali government troops and the pro-government moderate Islamist group Ahlu Sunna Waljama'a. In May 2011, al-Shabaab launched an attack aimed at retaking the area, but government forces led by Nur Matan Abdi, who is also a member of parliament, repelled the assault. In January 2012, a Kenyan Defense Forces (KDF) military aircraft carried out an airstrike on an Al-Shabaab stronghold south of Garbaharey, killing more than 50 fighters, wounding 60, and destroying more than 10 vehicles. In March 2012, Al-Shabaab launched a surprise raid lasting several hours during the night, using heavy weapons such as mortars and Technical (vehicle)s, to attack a base in Garbaharey from which Ethiopian military and Somali government-backed forces were preparing to launch an offensive, however, the attack was repelled with only two senior military officers killed.

In February 2012, Al-Shabaab fighters entered the town, and heavy shelling completely destroyed the laboratory at the town's hospital.

In January 2013, fighter jets from the Kenyan Defense Forces (KDF), operating as part of AMISOM, carried out an airstrike on an Al-Shabaab logistics base in the Garbaharey region. The attack killed several people, including Al-Shabaab's commander in Burdhubo District.

In August 2015, Somali government forces launched an attack on an al-Shabaab stronghold in the village of Burgadud, located near Garbaharey. At least 20 al-Shabaab fighters were killed and 30 wounded; the government also lost nine soldiers, including two senior officials.

In September 2015, the newly appointed Gedo Regional Governor refused to allow the former governor to enter Garbaharey, leading the former governor to lead his troops to set up camp outside the town and escalating the conflict; however, the two sides reached a reconciliation after mediation by local elders. Abdullahi Fartaag, Vice President of Jubaland, also visited to help mediate the dispute.

In 2015, al-Shabaab destroyed more than 70 donkey carts in Garbaharey. In Garbaharey, donkey carts served three important purposes—transporting crops and household goods, fetching water, and lending to other households—but they were expensive. In February 2026, the International Organization for Migration (IOM) Somalia, with funding from the Japanese government, provided donkey carts to 100 low-income households.

In December 2017, Somali government forces launched a large-scale offensive and recaptured villages between Garbaharey and Bardere from al-Shabaab. Al-Shabaab fled without putting up much resistance.

In August 2018, hundreds of residents of Garbaharey staged a protest against the Jubaland government. The residents voiced their hardships and called for change, urging the Federal Government of Somalia to intervene in the situation in Jubaland. During the protest, the residents stormed the home of Jubaland’s Minister of the Interior.

In October 2019, after Governor Garbahaarey visited Somalia's capital to discuss the drought, he was detained by security authorities and prevented from leaving the capital.

In the first half of 2020, a sand dam was constructed in a wadi, located 1 km from Garbaharey. The dam measures 1.2 kilometers in length, 50 to 60 meters in width, and 80 centimeters in height, with a freshwater storage capacity of 53,000 cubic meters, ensuring access to water for approximately 340 households (2,400 people). Before the project was built, boreholes were the only source of water, and during droughts, residents were forced to walk as far as 20 km to Tulo Barwaaqo or 40 km to the Juba River.

In August 2025, Mohamud Sayid Aden, First Vice President of Jubaland, condemned the actions of the Somali Federal Army in Garbaharey, calling them a provocation that undermined Jubaland's legitimate authority.
