= Dolow =

Dolow Doolow Dolo
- City
- Location in Somalia
- Coordinates: 4°9′0″N 42°5′0″E
- Country: Somalia
- State: Jubaland
- Region: Gedo
- District: Dolow District

Government
  - Mayor: Mohamed Lafey

Area
  - Total: 10 km^{2} (3.9 sq mi)
- Time zone: UTC+3 (EAT)

Dolow (; Italian: Dolo), also spelled Doolow, is a town in the southern Gedo region of Somalia.

The city sits on the Ganana River near the Somali Region in Ethiopia, just 50 km (31 mi) north of Luuq.

Buulo xaawo District lies west of Dolow near the North Eastern Province.

== District ==
Dolow town is the seat of one of the Gedo region's seven districts, Doolow District.

Dolow is located on the border with Ethiopia alongside the Dawa River where it meets the Ganana River. It was recognised as District in mid 19th century

== See also ==
- Dolo, Ethiopia
