= El Adde =

El Adde Ceel Cadde
- Town
- Location in Somalia
- Coordinates: 3°2′9″N 41°52′3″E
- Country: Somalia
- Region: Gedo
- District: El Adde

Government
  - Control: Al-Shabaab

Area
  - Total: 3.9 sq mi (10 km^{2})
- Time zone: UTC+3 (EAT)

El Adde (Somali: Ceel Cadde) is a town in the southwestern Gedo region of Somalia.

== Battle of El Adde ==
On 15 January 2016, Al-Shabaab militants attacked a Kenyan military base in El Adde, killing 141–185 soldiers.
