= Gedo =

Region of Somalia

Gedo Gobolka Gedo
- Region
- Gedo Region of Somalia
- Location in Somalia
- Coordinates: 2°26′17″N 41°29′3″E
- Country: Somalia
- Regional State: Jubaland
- Established: 1974
- Capital: Garbahaarrey

Government
  - Governor: Mohamed Omar Buule

Area
  - Total: 85,000 km^{2} (33,000 sq mi)
- Elevation: 914.4 m (3,000 ft)

Population (2019)
  - Total: 1,150,000
  - Density: 14/km^{2} (35/sq mi)
- Time zone: UTC+3 (EAT)
- ISO 3166 code: SO-GE
- HDI (2021): 0.318 low · 9th of 18

Gedo (Somali: Gedo, Maay: Gethy, Arabic: جيذو, Italian: Ghedo or Ghedu) is an administrative region (gobol) in Jubaland, southern Somalia. Its regional capital is Garbahaarreey. The region was formed during 1974 and is bordered by the Ogaden in Ethiopia, the North Eastern Province in Kenya, and the Somali regions of Bakool, Bay, Jubbada Dhexe (Middle Juba), and Jubbada Hoose (Lower Juba) further down east. The southern parts of Gedo, west of the Jubba River, used to be part of the old British Trans-Juba region during half of the seventy years of the colonial era in Africa from 1890 to 1960. The British and Italians fought twice over this area.

The regional capital is Garbahare.

President Siad Barre's forces withdrew to Gedo following the collapse of the Somali Democratic Republic in the early 1990s. After 1991, the Somali National Front (SNF) led by Omar Haji Mohamed held large parts of the region for many years. In collaboration with the SNF, Gedo joined the growing trend of Islamic Courts at the start of the Somali Civil War and local sharia courts succeeded in making Luuq District one of Somalia's safest areas for much of the 1990s. The militant religious group al-Itihaad al-Islamiya (AIAI) also rose to power in the region later, taking over the city of Luuq as its headquarters. The Ethiopian National Defence Force then entered the area to attack AIAI's bases in 1996. The first democratically elected governor of the administrative region was Hussein Farey, who entered office in 2008.

== Districts ==
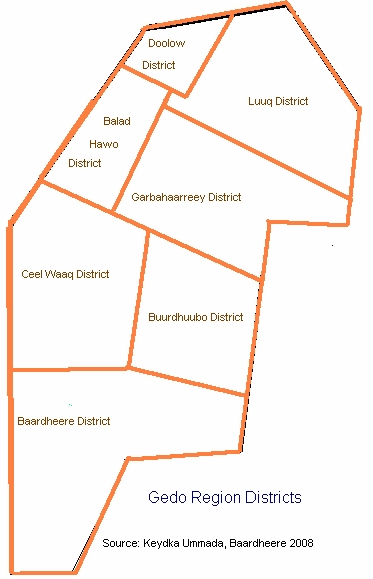

Gedo Region consists of seven districts:

- El Wak District
- Bardhere District
- Balet Hawo District
- Doolow District
- Garbaharey District
- Luuq District
- Buurdhuubo District

The Dawa and Jubba rivers are the two major rivers of the region.

== History ==
Historically, the Gedo region was inhabited and governed by clans including the Digil and Mirifle. Regional conflicts over the fertile lands around the Jubba and Dawa rivers flared long before European colonial expansion, though Italian forces later sought control of these waterways in the late 19th and early 20th centuries during the era of the Dervish movement. Over time, several small settlements in the area expanded and gained formal status as towns.

A major turning point occurred in 1991 when the central government collapsed, triggering civil war, and President Siad Barre fled Mogadishu through the border city of Beled Hawo. Despite the instability that followed—including regional clashes, internal clan disputes, and cross-border interventions by Ethiopian and Kenyan forces—Beled Hawo experienced unexpected economic growth. Strategic positioning at the border junction of Somalia, Ethiopia, and Kenya transformed the town into a thriving commercial hub.

Among the area's prominent historic landmarks is the Sheikh Makala shrine and mosque complex. Dating back to the 18th century, it remains a site of religious significance and annual pilgrimage, preserving local heritage alongside the region's complex modern history.

== Education ==
The city of Garbahare and the region's two ancient cities of Luuq and Bardera had education systems up to the secondary level. There were some technical schools in Bardera and Garbaharreey, albeit without a curriculum. They are connected through the Gedo Education Committee. All of Gedo region's high school graduates attended the Somali National University or affiliated institutions in Mogadishu.

Since the civil war in Somalia, Gedo became one of half dozen regions which have restarted higher education institutions in the country. Bardera Polytechnic, Gedo's first college, and the University of Gedo, are both located in Bardera.

== Demographics ==
According to a 1994 UNOSOM II estimate, the population of Gedo was about 590,000. The United Nations Development Programme estimated the total population in 2005 at 328,378; and UN estimates from 2014 stand at some 508,000.

== Economy ==
The economy mostly depends on livestock and farming, but the Gedo region has strong interregional and international cross-border trade with Kenya and to some extent with Ethiopia. Trade across Somalia, Kenya and Ethiopia allowed the Gedo region to be economically stable for the years before the UN intervention and afterward. The 1998 Nordic Fact Finding Mission prepared a report on the Gedo region and found some encouraging economic figures. Davidson College assistant professor Ken Menkhaus said that "Traders in Gedo region made more profit than, for instance, those in Hargeisa, in north-western Somalia." Trade going through the border between the three countries was ongoing despite the raging civil war in Somalia for much of the 1990.

== Government ==
Gedo region has a 32-member assembly body. The members are directly elected from the seven districts of the region with proportionality according to district population. The Gedo assembly or (Gollaha Gobalka Gedo) works with the federal government based in Mogadishu. Regional level posts include:

- Governor
- Vice Governor
- Inter-Regional Affairs Director
- Director of Security Services
- Gedo Regional Police Commander
- Director of Education Services
- Director of Agricultural Agency
- Director of Economic Affairs
- Livestock and Forestry Dept. Director
- Director of Justice and Religious Affairs

After long conflicts in the region, the regional elders started a peace conference with initiatives from the then governor, Aden Ibrahim Aw Hirsi. This effort ended in success. and were followed by the elections of the regional assembly. The process was financed by UNDP.

In addition to regional posts, the Federal Government of Somalia maintains military forces in the region. Brigade 9 of Division 60 (Somalia) was reported in the region as of 2016, originating from a U.S.-funded pilot programme that began in 2012.

== Cities and towns ==
Bardera and Buulo Haawo cities are the two principal cities of the Gedo region. In the recent past, Luuq or Lugh used to be the main political city of the Gedo Region, but the Somali Civil War made many of the city's residents to flee to other towns.

Bardera, the largest city and the seat of the most populous district in Gedo, has become urbanized to the extent that its population multiplied 400% since the breakdown of law and order in the capital of the country, Mogadishu. Aside from the urban population in proper Bardera, the rest of the region's population are pastoralists with the exception of people living in the cities where the region's seven district seats are located. The town is home to Bardera Polytechnic as well as the University of Gedo which also has a campus at Buulo Haawo.

- Adayle
- Anoole
- Daar
- Mardhaa
- Bardera
- Barwaaqo
- Buulo Haawo
- Banaaney
- Bilcisha
- Boorame
- Buraa
- Boore
- Buulo Mareer
- Buurdhuubo
- Buusaar
- Caanoole
- Cinjirta
- Caracase
- Ceel Cadde
- Ceel Duur
- Ceel Gaduud
- Ceel Waaq
- Dhamasa or Dhamaso
- Dheenle
- Dhuusaay
- Doolow
- Calijiciir
- El Mergis
- Fafahdun
- Faan Weyn
- Gantamaa
- Garbahaarreey
- Gedweyne
- Gerileey
- Gosoweyna
- Hareeri
- Kurmaan
- Luuq
- Malmaleey
- Mudulow
- madhawey
- Qooneey
- Shaatooloow
- Siidimo
- Uunsi
- Gus waran
- Eeykiintuuri
- Uar Esgudud
- Xamara
- Yurkud
