= Saków =

- Village
- Location within Poland
- Coordinates: 52°1′N 18°58′E
- Country: Poland
- Voivodeship: Łódź
- County: Poddębice
- Gmina: Wartkowice

Saków [ˈsakuf] is a village in the administrative district of Gmina Wartkowice, within Poddębice County, Łódź Voivodeship, in central Poland.
