= Bardhere District =

- District
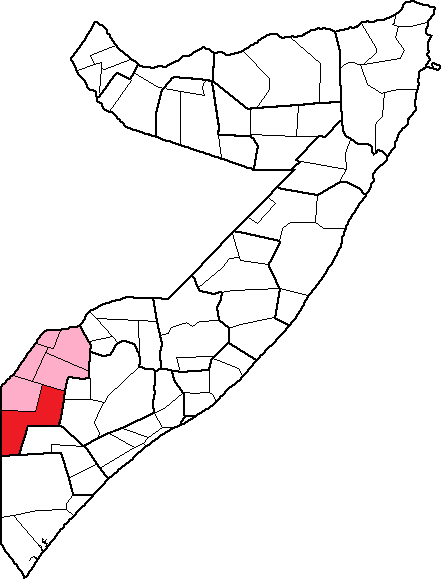
- Coordinates: 2°20′N 42°17′E
- Country: Somalia
- Region: Gedo
- Capital: Bardhere
- Time zone: UTC+3 (EAT)

Bardhere District (Somali: Degmada Bardhere) is a district in the southwestern Gedo region of Somalia. It was first made a political district in 1941. A decade and a half later, during the 1956 general elections, a Somali parliament was voted to be put into place by 1960, once independence would be achieved. All elected Gedo representatives were elected from the districts of Bardhere and Luuq.

The administrative seat of the district is the city of Bardhere.
