= Jubba River =

River in Somalia

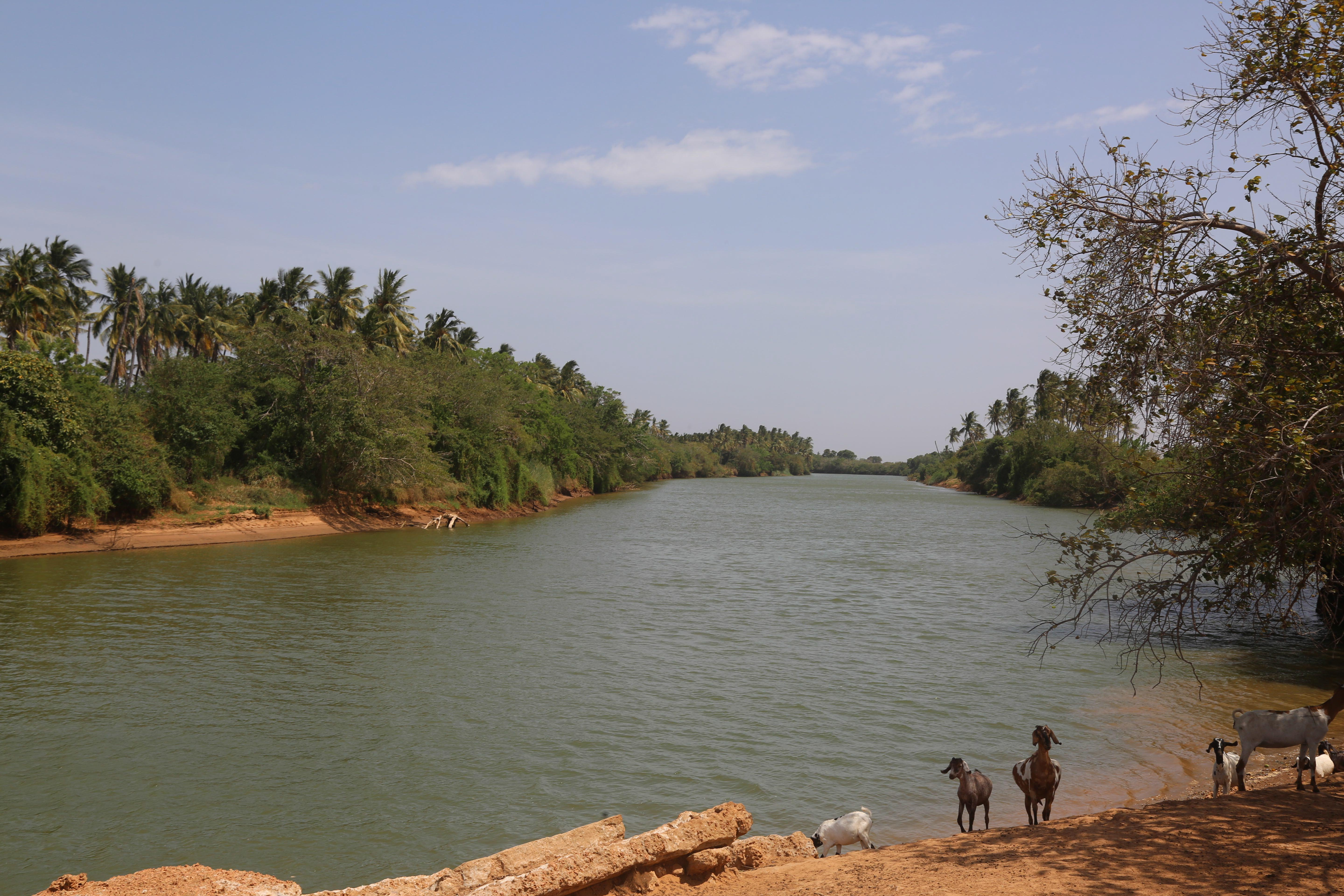
- The Jubba River at Goobweyn

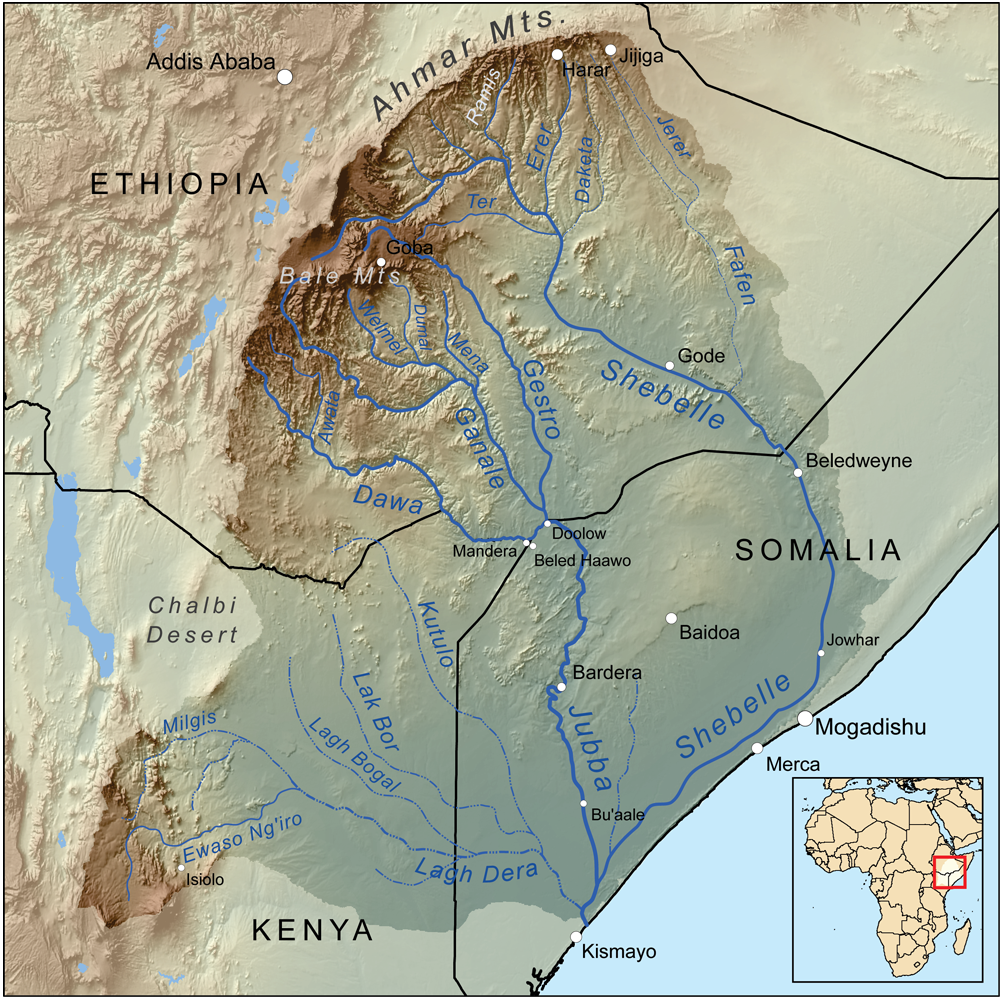
- Map of the Jubba/Shebelle drainage basin
- Native name: Webiga Jubba (Somali)

Location
- Countries: Somalia; Ethiopia

Physical characteristics
- Source
  - location: Ganale Dorya River
  - coordinates: 6°48′45″N 39°07′14″E
  - length: 1,634 km (1,015 mi)
  - elevation: 3,588 m (11,772 ft)
- 2nd source
  - location: Dawa River
  - coordinates: 6°13′35″N 38°24′30″E
  - length: 1,614 km (1,003 mi)
  - elevation: 3,023 m (9,918 ft)
- 3rd source
  - location: Shebelle River
  - coordinates: 6°51′14″N 38°41′14″E
  - length: 2,064 km (1,283 mi)
  - elevation: 2,711 m (8,894 ft)
- Source confluence
  - location: Confluence of Dawa River and Ganale Dorya River
  - coordinates: 4.1771°N 42.0809°E
  - elevation: 174 m (571 ft)
- Mouth: Somali Sea
  - location: Goobweyn
  - coordinates: 0.2495°S 42.6307°E
  - elevation: 0 m (0 ft)
- Length: 2,064 km (1,283 mi)
- Basin size: 745,374 km^{2} (287,791 sq mi)
- Discharge
  - location: Mouth
  - average: 536.7 m^{3}/s (18,950 cu ft/s)
  - minimum: 179.2 m^{3}/s (6,330 cu ft/s)
  - maximum: 1,055.7 m^{3}/s (37,280 cu ft/s)

Basin features
- Population: 27,100,000
- Tributaries
  - left: Ganale Dorya, Shebelle
  - right: Dawa, Ewaso Ng'iro

The Jubba River or Juba River (Somali: Webiga Jubba, Italian: fiume Giuba) is a river in southern Somalia which flows through the region of Jubaland. It begins at the border with Ethiopia, where the Dawa and Ganale Dorya rivers meet, and flows directly south to the Somali Sea, where it empties at the Goobweyn juncture. The Jubba basin covers an area of 749,000 km^{2} (289,000 mi^{2}). The Somali regional state of Jubaland, formerly called Trans-Juba, is named after the river.

== History ==
=== Ajuran Empire ===
The Jubba River was once a productive civilization and trade network conducted by the Somalis that held sway over the Jubba River.

During the Middle Ages Jubba River was under the Ajuran Empire of the Horn of Africa which utilized the Jubba River for its plantations and was the only hydraulic empire in Africa. A hydraulic empire that rose in the 13th century AD, Ajuran monopolized the water resources of the Jubba River and Shebelle. Through hydraulic engineering, it also constructed many of the limestone wells and cisterns of the state that are still operative and in use today. Its rulers developed new systems for agriculture and taxation, which continued to be used in parts of the Horn of Africa as late as the 19th century.

Through their control of the region's wells, the Garen rulers effectively held a monopoly over their nomadic subjects as they were one of the few hydraulic empire in Africa. Large wells made out of limestone were constructed throughout the state, which attracted Somali nomads with their livestock. The centralized regulations of the wells made it easier for the nomads to settle disputes by taking their queries to government officials who would act as mediators. Long distance caravan trade, a long-time practice in the Horn of Africa, continued unchanged in Ajuran times. Today, numerous ruins and abandoned towns throughout the interior of Somalia and the Horn of Africa are evidence of a once-booming inland trade network dating from the medieval period.

With the centralized supervision of the Ajuran, farms in Afgooye, Bardhere and other areas in the Jubba and Shebelle valleys increased their productivity. A system of irrigation ditches known locally as Kelliyo fed directly from the Shebelle River and Jubba River into the plantations where sorghum, maize, beans, grain and cotton were grown during the gu (Spring in Somali) and xagaa (Summer in Somali) seasons of the Somali calendar. This irrigation system was supported by numerous dikes and dams. To determine the average size of a farm, a land measurement system was also invented with moos, taraab and guldeed being the terms used.

The urban centers of Mogadishu, Merca, Barawa, Kismayo and Hobyo and other respective ports became profitable trade outlets for commodities originating from the interior of the State. The Somali farming communities of the hinterland from Jubba and Shebelle valleys brought their crops to the Somali coastal cities, where they were sold to local merchants who maintained a lucrative foreign commerce with ships sailing to and coming from Arabia, Persia, India, Venice, Egypt, Portugal, and as far away as Java and China.

=== Modern Period ===
Over two centuries passed until German explorer Baron Karl Klaus von der Decken ascended on the lower reaches of the river on the small steamship Welf in 1863. He wrecked the steamship in the rapids above Bardhere, where the party was attacked by local Somalis, ending in the deaths of the Baron and three others in his party. The first European to explore widely and complete the course of the river was the Italian explorer Vittorio Bottego attended by Commander F. G. Dundas British Navy. Bottego and his expedition sailed 640 km (400 miles) of the river in 1891. During his exploration Bottego changed the name of the main affluent of Jubba—the Ganale river—in Ganale Doria after the famous Italian naturalist Giacomo Doria.

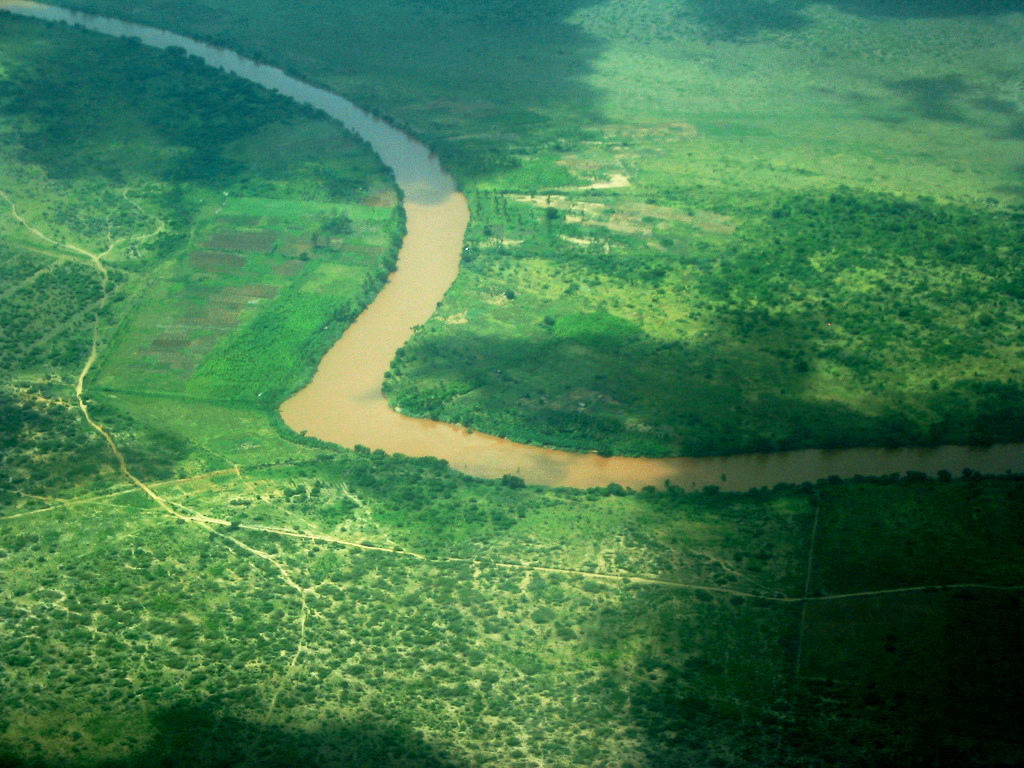
The Jubba river near Jamaame

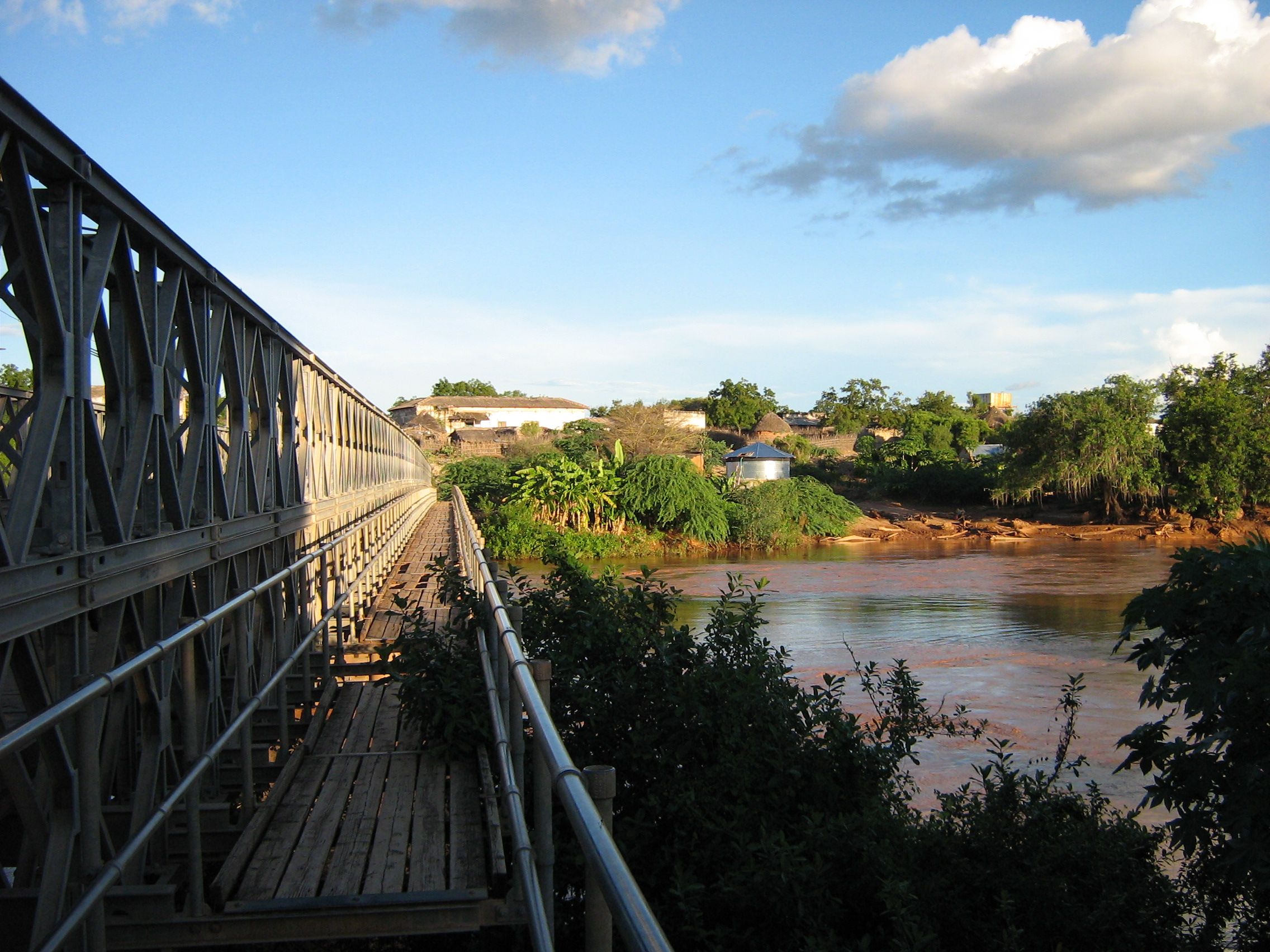
Bridge over the Jubba river in Bardhere District

== Overview ==
The Jubba basin region is primarily savanna, and is, ecologically speaking, the richest part of the country due to its fertile farmland. Native wildlife includes giraffes, cheetahs, lions, leopards, hyenas, buffalos, hippopotamus, crocodiles, oryx, gazelles, camels, ostriches, jackals, and Somali wild asses.

The Jubba River gives its name to the Somali administrative regions of Upper Juba (Gedo, Bay, Bakool), Middle Juba and Lower Juba, as well as to the larger historical region of Jubaland. Major cities which the Jubba River passes by include Dolow, Luuq, Burdhubo, Beled'hawo, Bardhere, Buale, and Goobweyn near Kismaayo.

== See also ==
- Shebelle River
