= Bardere =

City in Somalia

Bardere باردير Bardhere
- City
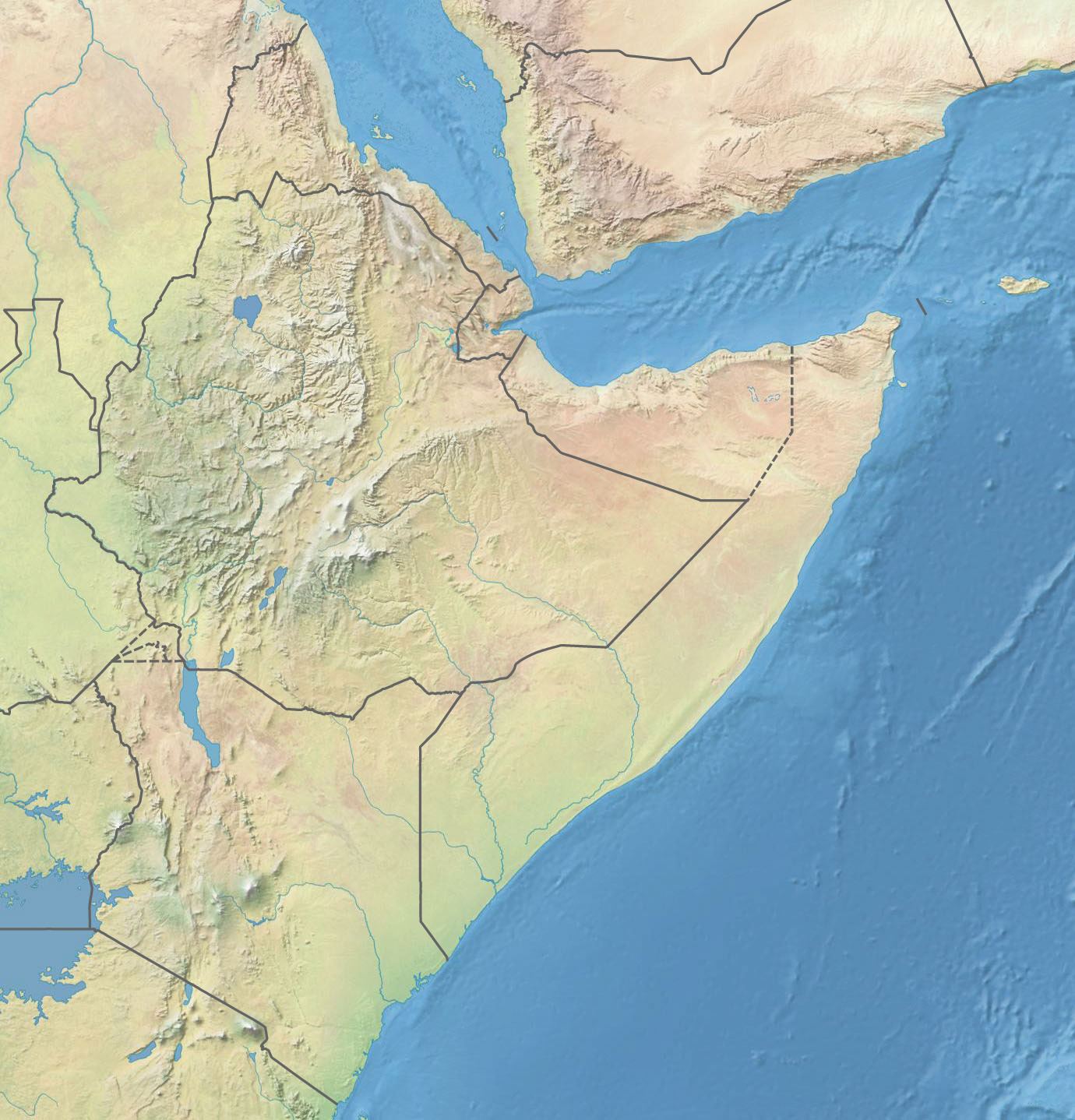
- Location within Somalia Location within the Horn of Africa Location within Africa
- Coordinates: 2°20′N 42°17′E
- Country: Somalia
- State: Jubaland
- Region: Gedo
- District: Bardhere
- Established: 1700

Government
  - Type: Mayor
  - Bardere District Commissioner: Mohamed khadar Ahmed Derow

Area
  - Land: 15 km^{2} (5.8 sq mi)
  - Water: 5 km^{2} (1.9 sq mi) 8%
  - Urban: 15 km^{2} (5.8 sq mi)
  - Metro: 45 km^{2} (17 sq mi)
- Elevation: 168 m (551 ft)

Population
  - Estimate: between 5,000 and 10,000
  - Density: 26/km^{2} (67/sq mi)
- 2021 estimate
- Time zone: UTC+3 (EAT)

Bardere (Arabic: باردير, Somali: Bardhere, Italian: Bardera) also known as Bardera, is a city in Jubaland State of Somalia. It is the second most populous city in the region. Bardere sits on the Jubba River around 250 km west of the city of Baidoa and is in a highland area with fertile soil.

== Etymology ==
Bardera is an important agricultural centre living up to its name Bar meaning "palm tree", and Dhere meaning "tall" a reference to the ubiquitous palm trees that have grown expansively in the area.

The river banks are lined by palm trees and so are the farms of this town that lies at an intersection of all major roads that links Somalia to Elwak and Mandera in Kenya, Kismayo, Baidoa, Barawe and Dinsoor within Somalia.

== History ==
=== Medieval ===
During the Middle Ages, Bardera and its surrounding area was part of the Ajuran Empire that governed much of southern Somalia and eastern Ethiopia, with its domain extending to Hobyo in the north, Qelafo in the west, and Kismayo in the south. Bardera was one of the most important cities on the Jubba river during the Ajuran period. It was an agricultural and commercial center. Known as a centre for Islamic scholarship, it also had roads that connected the Benadir ports built by Ajuran. Bardhere provided many goods to the coastal provinces and many merchants across the region came to Bardera for trade.

=== Early Modern ===
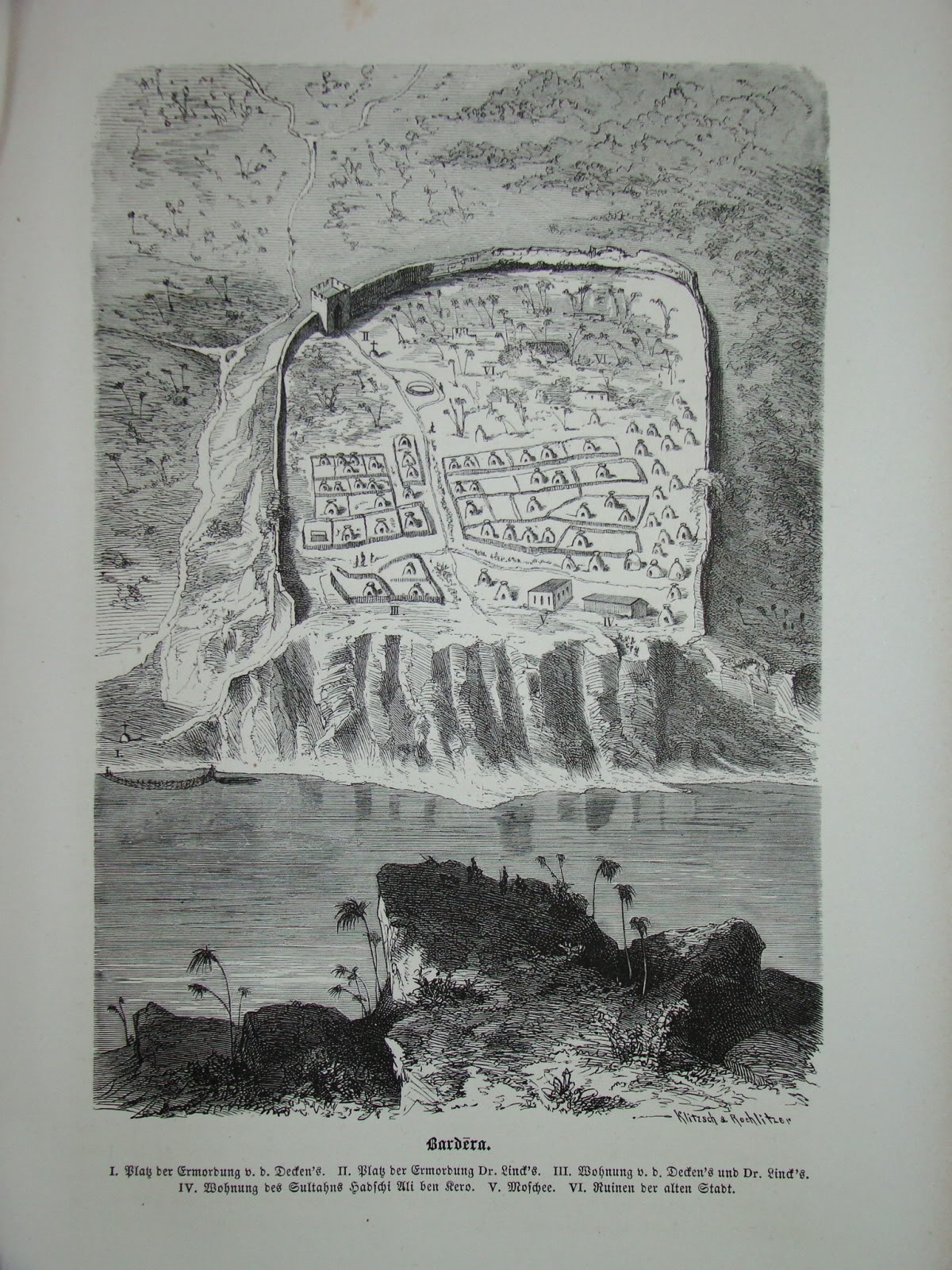
View of the Bardera Citadel in the mid-1800s by Baron Karl Klaus von der Decken.

Bardera continued its agricultural and commercial legacy under Geledi Sultanate rule where it was surrounded by a citadel. Both the Benadir ports and Bardera flourished thanks an increased connection between the coast and interior. The city served as the key ivory hub in the southern part of the Horn.

In the 1830s, a new militant extremist group rose in the citadel of Bardera, overlooking the Jubba River. The group began imposing their interpretation of Islam on the surrounding regions, including the coastal city of Barawa, which they subdued and captured in 1840. In response, Sultan Yusuf Mahamud gathered his armies into a coalition and marched towards Bardera. The citadel was besieged and then burned to the ground, solidifying Sultan Yusuf's paramount authority in southern Somalia. Following the Conquest of Bardera, the city recovered and remained relatively quiet until the eventual end of the Geledi Sultanate and subsequent incorporation into Italian Somaliland.

=== Modern ===
After independence in 1960, the city was made the center of the official Bardera District.

Bardera became the first place in Somalia were onions were grown commercially. This production began to increase rapidly but eventually fell off in the 1980s due to failed agricultural policies of the Somali government. The actual quality soil is in a narrow strip on either side of the river where pumps can feed private farms. Other produce such as sorghum can be found in Markabley/Hayranta although still in the district.

German Explorer Carl Von Der Decken was killed at this same site in 1860, remnants of his wrecked ship still remain.

== Economy ==
The economy of Bardera is largely agriculture-based. Animal husbandry also figures prominently, with livestock being kept for meat, milk and butter.

There are two types of farming which exist in Bardera area: Irrigated farming and seasonal farming.

Many medium- and small-scale farms near the river use water pumping machines. These motors irrigate the land with canals, and farmers plant crops.

The majority of farmers use a low-tech farming method of farming during the two rainy seasons. Small operation farms are found throughout Jubaland, far away from the river banks where families plant sorghum, maize, and beans on any land that is suitable for farming.

Mogadishu's fruit and vegetable market used to have a section containing a famous onion product from Bardera. Since the start of the civil war in Somalia, produce from Bardera to large urban centers like Mogadishu, Kismayo, or Baidoa were diverted to Kenyan markets such as Wajir, Garissa, Mombasa, and Nairobi.

The district has a long serving Chamber of Commerce led by Bashir Noor Ahmed as its Chairman. The Chamber of Commerce works to ensure there are markets available for local agricultural products and animals.

Sorghum, corn or maize, different types of onions, beans, sesame, tobacco, and fruits such as bananas, watermelon, oranges, papayas, and mangoes from Bardera farms reach markets as far as Djibouti, about 3,000 km away to the north of Somalia.

== Education ==
Bardera has long been a center of higher learning. The city is famously associated with the study of Islamic jurisprudence.

Bardera's Islamic centers attracted students seeking knowledge and teachers seeking employment used to come from across Somalia. Bardera has 20 elementary schools, seventeen primary and secondary schools. Bardera polytechnic college was founded in July 2008. This college was established to cover the higher education needs of the Bardera area community, which has been growing since the start of the 1990s. The college aims to give vocational training and marketable skills to people between 16 and 60 years of age.

Juba Valley Agricultural Institute is an academic institute within the Bardera Polytechnic College in Bardera, Somalia. It is situated within the southern Jubaland.

Juba Valley Veterinary Institute is a veterinary institute in Bardera, Somalia. The institute is part of Bardera Polytechnic specialized schools and institutes within the college system.

Both Juba Valley Agricultural Institute and Jubba Valley Veterinary institute were part of the second phase of development at Bardera Polytechnic.

For centuries, students traveled from distances and from all points on the Horn as a whole.

Later generations found different kind of class spaces at Somali National University (SNU), Lafole, Lafole Agricultural College and Sidam management training school.

=== Climate ===
Bardera is characterized by warm weather and high humidity, having a hot arid climate (Köppen climate classification BWh) despite receiving around 380 millimetres or 15 inches of annual rainfall, owing to its extremely high potential evapotranspiration.

Climate data for Bardera
Month	Jan	Feb	Mar	Apr	May	Jun	Jul	Aug	Sep	Oct	Nov	Dec	Year
Record high °C (°F)	45.0 (113.0)	45.0 (113.0)	49.0 (120.2)	46.0 (114.8)	45.0 (113.0)	46.0 (114.8)	42.0 (107.6)	39.0 (102.2)	43.0 (109.4)	44.0 (111.2)	43.0 (109.4)	43.0 (109.4)	49.0 (120.2)
Mean daily maximum °C (°F)	38.2 (100.8)	39.3 (102.7)	41.4 (106.5)	38.0 (100.4)	35.6 (96.1)	34.0 (93.2)	32.5 (90.5)	33.1 (91.6)	34.9 (94.8)	36.1 (97.0)	35.9 (96.6)	36.7 (98.1)	36.3 (97.3)
Daily mean °C (°F)	29.7 (85.5)	30.6 (87.1)	31.5 (88.7)	30.4 (86.7)	29.0 (84.2)	27.7 (81.9)	26.2 (79.2)	26.8 (80.2)	28.2 (82.8)	29.1 (84.4)	28.8 (83.8)	29.1 (84.4)	29.0 (84.2)
Mean daily minimum °C (°F)	21.4 (70.5)	22.0 (71.6)	22.9 (73.2)	22.9 (73.2)	22.6 (72.7)	21.3 (70.3)	20.4 (68.7)	20.9 (69.6)	21.5 (70.7)	22.1 (71.8)	21.7 (71.1)	21.6 (70.9)	21.8 (71.2)
Record low °C (°F)	16.0 (60.8)	17.0 (62.6)	18.0 (64.4)	18.0 (64.4)	18.0 (64.4)	16.5 (61.7)	15.0 (59.0)	12.0 (53.6)	16.0 (60.8)	18.5 (65.3)	14.0 (57.2)	16.0 (60.8)	12.0 (53.6)
Average rainfall mm (inches)	6 (0.2)	6 (0.2)	22 (0.9)	93 (3.7)	55 (2.2)	15 (0.6)	25 (1.0)	7 (0.3)	6 (0.2)	63 (2.5)	57 (2.2)	29 (1.1)	384 (15.1)
Average rainy days (≥ 0.1 mm)	1	1	3	8	5	3	4	2	1	5	6	4	43
Average relative humidity (%)	63	61	61	69	72	71	69	70	69	73	72	69	68
Mean monthly sunshine hours	285.2	262.7	291.4	228.0	235.6	207.0	186.0	226.3	231.0	213.9	219.0	254.2	2,840.3
Mean daily sunshine hours	9.2	9.3	9.4	7.6	7.6	6.9	6.0	7.3	7.7	6.9	7.3	8.2	7.8
Percentage possible sunshine	80	80	73	55	55	55	55	55	64	55	64	73	64
Source 1: Deutscher Wetterdienst
Source 2: Food and Agriculture Organization: Somalia Water and Land Management (percent sunshine)

== Photos ==
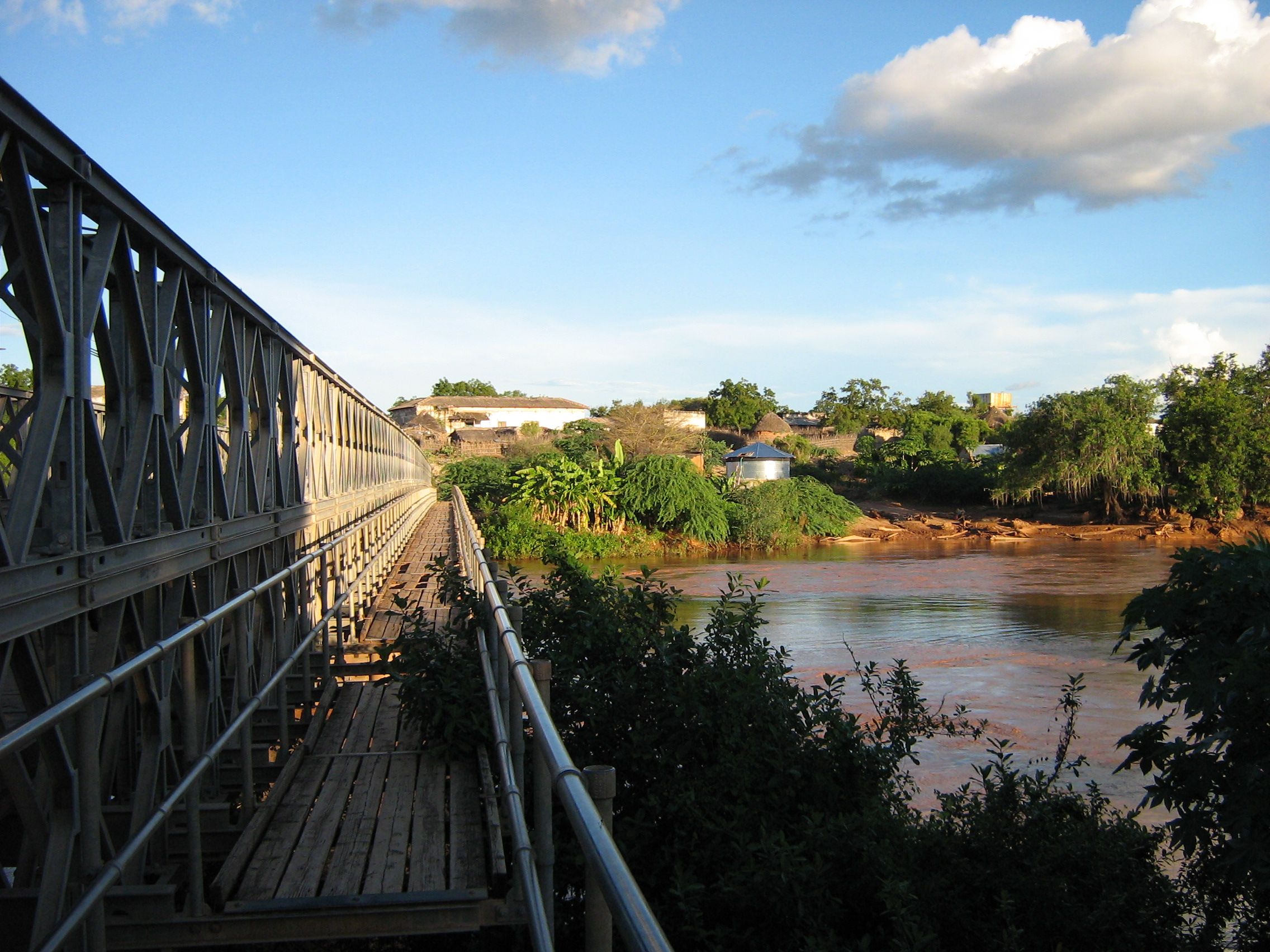
Bridge in Bardera

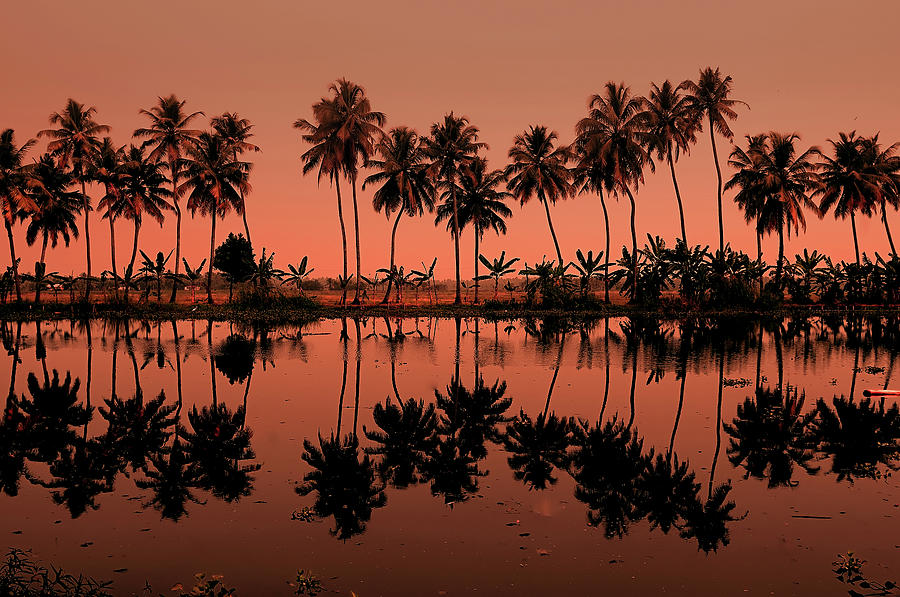
Bardera palm trees

== Notable people ==
- Abdiweli Sheikh Ahmed, Former Prime minister of Somalia.
- Farah Hussein Sharmarke, Philosopher, Poet.
- Fatimo Isaak Bihi, First Somali female ambassador, Ambassador to Geneva, Director of the African Department of the Ministry of Foreign Affairs.
- Aden Ibrahim Aw Hirsi, Author, Somali Politician.
- Ahmed Warsame, Head of the Somali Military Academy.
- Mohamud Ali Magan, Somali Foreign Affairs, Consul General to United States Of America and Canada.
- Ali Shire Warsame, Somali Politician
