= Somalis in Ethiopia =

Ethnic Somalis living in Ethiopia

Ethiopian Somalis
Soomaali Itoobiyaan (Somali) الصوماليون الإثيوبيون (Arabic)

Total population
- 4.58 million (2007)

Regions with significant populations
- Somali Region

Languages
- Somali

Religion
- Significant Majority: Islam

Related ethnic groups
- Afar • Saho • other Cushitic peoples^{a} The Somali language is one of the five official languages of Ethiopia although a distinct Somali dialect is often spoken

Ethiopian Somalis refers to the Somalis from modern-day Ethiopia, particularly the Ogaden, officially the Somali Region. Their language is primarily Somali and they are predominantly Muslim. According to the 2007 census from the Central Statistical Authority, the Somalis were the third largest ethnic group in Ethiopia with roughly 4.58 million people accounting for 6.2% of the country's population, after the Oromo (35%) and Amhara (27%). The Somali population in Ethiopia are equivalent to about 30% of the total population in Somalia.

== History ==
=== Early presence ===
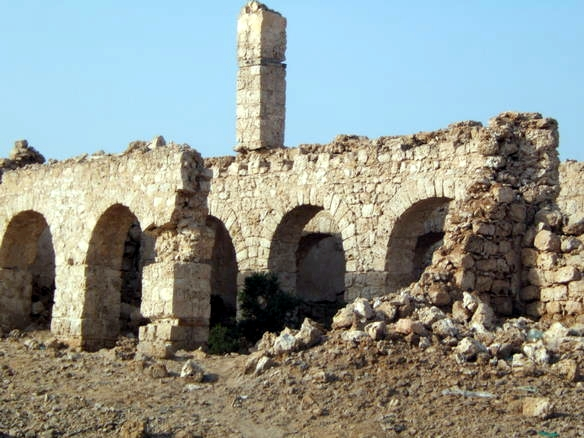
Ruins of the Adal Sultanate in Zeila, a kingdom led in the 16th century by Imam Ahmad ibn Ibrahim al-Ghazi(Ahmad Gurey).

Somalis have inhabited the interiors of the Horn for thousands of years. According to linguists, the first Afro-Asiatic-speaking populations arrived in the region during the ensuing Neolithic period from the family's proposed "Urheimat" (Original Homeland) in the Nile Valley, or Near East. Other scholars propose that the Afro-Asiatic family developed in the Horn of Africa, with its speakers subsequently dispersing from there.

Islam was introduced to the area early on by the first Muslims of Mecca fleeing prosecution during the first Hejira with Masjid al-Qiblatayn being built before the Qiblah faced towards Mecca. The town of Zeila's two-mihrab Masjid al-Qiblatayn dates to the 7th century, and is one of the oldest mosques in Africa. Consequently, the Somalis were some of the earliest non-Arabs to convert to Islam.

The first clear written Ethiopian reference of the ethnonym Somali dates back to the early 15th century during the reign of Ethiopian Emperor Yeshaq I who had one of his court officials compose a hymn celebrating a military victory over the Sultanate of Ifat. Simur was also an ancient Harari alias for the Somali people.

Somalis began building nation-state networks to various states in the form of sultanates. The Adal Sultanate (ruled by the Somali Muslims with other signification Cushitic Muslim populations like Hararis and Afars) was one of the most powerful states with capital Zeila (in present-day Somalia).

In response to centuries of mistreatment by the Ethiopian Empire, the 16th century Imam Ahmad ibn Ibrahim al-Ghazi united the Muslims of the Horn of Africa, and led an invasion of Abyssinia which brought much of the Christian polity under Muslim control. The Ethiopians, as a last resort managed to secure the assistance of the Portuguese Empire and maintained their domain's autonomy, defeating Imam Ahmad at the Battle of Wayna Daga.

=== 1884–1960 ===
Independent accounts consistently confirm that, prior to Ethiopian incursions into the Ogaden and Hararghe in the 1880s, Somali clans operated free of Ethiopian or Shewan authority. There is no historical evidence suggesting Ethiopia controlled Somali-inhabited territories prior to Menelik II’s expansions into the south and southeast in the late 19th century.

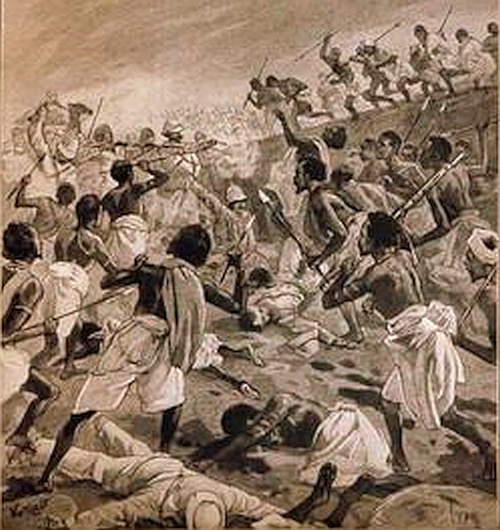
European artists depiction of the 1896 "Lafoole Massacre"

During the Scramble for Africa in 1884, most of Somali inhabited areas came under colonial rule: the British Empire established the Somaliland Protectorate through Anglo-Somali protection treaties, while Italy claimed Italian Somaliland in 1889. These divisions were later formalised in the 1891 Anglo-Italian Treaty, delineating British and Italian spheres of influence in East Africa, including Ethiopia, Somalia, and Eritrea.

In accordance with Treaty of Wuchale (1889) signed between Ethiopia and Italy, Italy, acting as protector of Ethiopia, demarcated the boundary between Ethiopia and British Somaliland as follows:

The boundary of the spheres of influence of Great Britain and of Italy in the regions of the Gulf of Aden shall be constituted by a line which, starting from Gildessa [Jeldesa] and running toward the eighth degree of north latitude, skirts the north-east frontier of the territories of the Girrhi, Bertiti, and Rer Ali Tribes, leaving to the right the villages of Gildessa, Darmi, Gig, and Milmil. On reaching the eighth degree of the north latitude the line follows that parallel as far as its intersection with the 48th degree of longitude east of Greenwich.

Disregarding the Anglo-Italian Treaty, which laid the foundations for the Gadabuursi clan’s lands under British Somaliland Protectorate, Menelik II sought to assert control over Somali territory. Menelik constructed grass huts at Alola, a spring southeast of Biyo Kabobe, and raised a flag to claim the territories of the Gadabuursi and Issa clans (encompassing present-day Shinile, Jijiga, and Awbare) as belonging to the Ethiopian Empire.

In 1896, Emperor Menelik II proposed extending his empire's boundaries to include the western Somali territories of Ogaden, submitting the proposal to Italy. A year later, Italy unilaterally accepted the proposed boundaries via telegraph, without even formalising a proper agreement.

In 1897, the Ethiopian Empire continued its expansion on territories of where Somali people settled. The Ethiopians reached an agreement with the British to demarcate a border between Ethiopia and British Somaliland, excluding the Haud. In the treaty, the British ceded Somali territory to Menelik in exchange for his help fighting against the Somali clans. Moreover, the treaty occurred as the Somalis were not consulted and informed. In addition, the treaty was legally void because it presumed an authority which the Somalis had never accorded to the United Kingdom, as agreements that had been signed between the British and Somali people had been to protect their tribal lands.

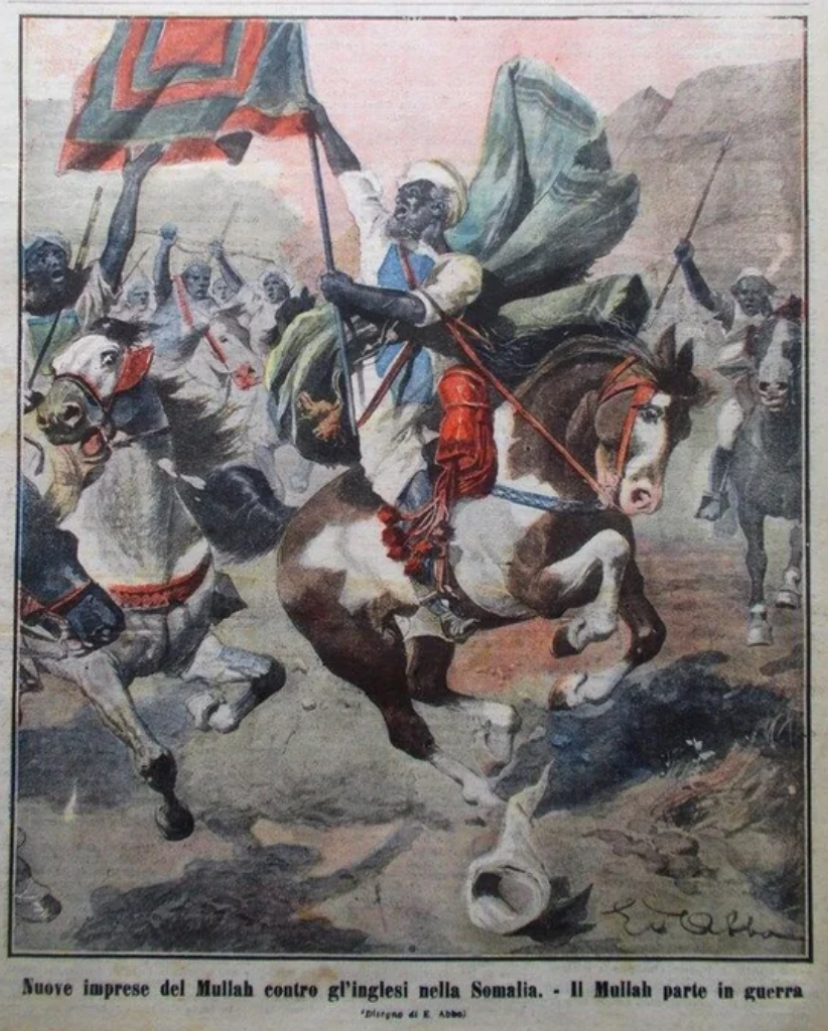
The cover of the Italian magazine La Tribuna Illustrata of Mohammed Abdullah Hassan titled "The Mullah goes to war".

Strong anti-colonial sentiments in the Somali regions culminated in the formation of the Dervish movement, led by Sayyid Mohammed Abdullah Hassan. The movement waged a prolonged anti-colonial war against the British and Ethiopians in the Somali Peninsula for more than twenty years. Motivated by a mix of religious zeal, resistance to foreign domination, and Somali nationalism, the movement aimed to expel British and Ethiopian influence and establish an independent Islamic state.

The Dervish movement began targeting Ethiopian forces due to frequent raids by Ethiopian troops who were expanding in the Ogaden region. In 1900, after an Ethiopian expedition looted camels from local Somalis, Hassan rallied 6,000 fighters from clans like the Dhulbahante to retaliate. The Dervishes, were known to use fast, coordinated assaults, drawing inspiration from Mahdist tactics. The movement gained a following by blending Islamic revivalism and anti-colonial resistance.

In 1907, Anglo-Ethiopian Agreement demarcated their boundary with the East Africa Protectorate (Kenya). This placed Italian Somaliland in a rectangular point where Dewa and Genale rivers conjoined.

After a decisive British offensive and almost a quarter of a century of anti-imperialist resistance, the Dervishes were defeated in January 1920. The British Royal Air Force launched a combined air and ground campaign, using 12 Airco DH.9A aircraft—the first major aerial bombardment in Africa. The bombing devastated Taleh, the Dervish capital, and other strongholds, killing many fighters and disrupting their defenses.

In the 1920s and 1930s, there were no permanent Ethiopian settlements or administration in any Somali inhabited land, only military encampments. Due to native hostility, the region was barely occupied by Ethiopian authorities, who exerted little to no presence east of Jijiga, until the Anglo-Ethiopian boundary commission in 1934 and the Wal Wal incident in 1935. The incident at Wal Wal ignited the Second Italo-Ethiopian War and paved the way for Italy’s occupation of Ethiopia. It arose from a dispute over the poorly defined border between Ethiopia and Italian Somaliland. Britain and Ethiopia had established a joint boundary commission to clarify the Somali-Ethiopia border. However, the commission’s work was incomplete, and disagreements persisted, which left the region’s status ambiguous.

In 1936, Italian forces had captured Addis Ababa, leading to the military occupation of the Ethiopian Empire and the proclamation of Italian East Africa, which incorporated Ethiopia, Eritrea, and Italian Somaliland. In a bid to gain support among the Somali population, the Italians pushed forth their own vision of the Greater Somalia's realization within Italian East Africa. By September 1940, Benito Mussolini declared the formation of Greater Somalia into the Italian Empire.

In 1941, the British entered Italian Somaliland, the Haud and Ogaden and brought the land under its rule with the help of Ethiopian forces. Soon after the restoration of Haile Selassie rule, the Haud and Ogaden regions were immediately placed under British military administration until the Anglo-Ethiopian Agreement warranted its sovereignty status in 1944. The first nationalist group emerged in May 1943 called Somali Youth Club (later renamed SYL) by thirteenth young Somali nationalists operating its field offices in the Ogaden region, particularly in Jijiga.

In 1946, following the end of World War II, British Foreign Secretary Ernest Bevin proposed to the Allied Council of Foreign Ministers a plan to place Somali-inhabited territories under British Military Administration. The Bevin Plan was rejected, facing strong opposition from the Soviet Union, the United States, and France. In 1948, the British administration withdrew from the Ogaden region and, without formal agreement and through covert arrangements, transferred control of the region to Ethiopia. Thus, the modern Somali Region was incorporated into Ethiopia. In 1955, the British administration withdrew from the Haud, and Ethiopia formally took over the territories. In March 1955, the same year, the National United Front (NUF) attempted to retake the Haud and Reserve Area, culminating in series violent clashes and conflicts.

In 1958, the UN Trusteeship Council established an arbitration tribunal to resolve the territorial dispute between Ethiopia and Somalia, but the effort proved ineffective. The Somalis consistently rejected the 1897 Anglo-Ethiopian delimitation and refused to recognise its legal validity. Growing discontent fuelled demands to liberate the whole country and unify Greater Somalia, which further challenged the legitimacy of the 1897 Anglo-Ethiopian Agreement.

=== 1960–1995 ===
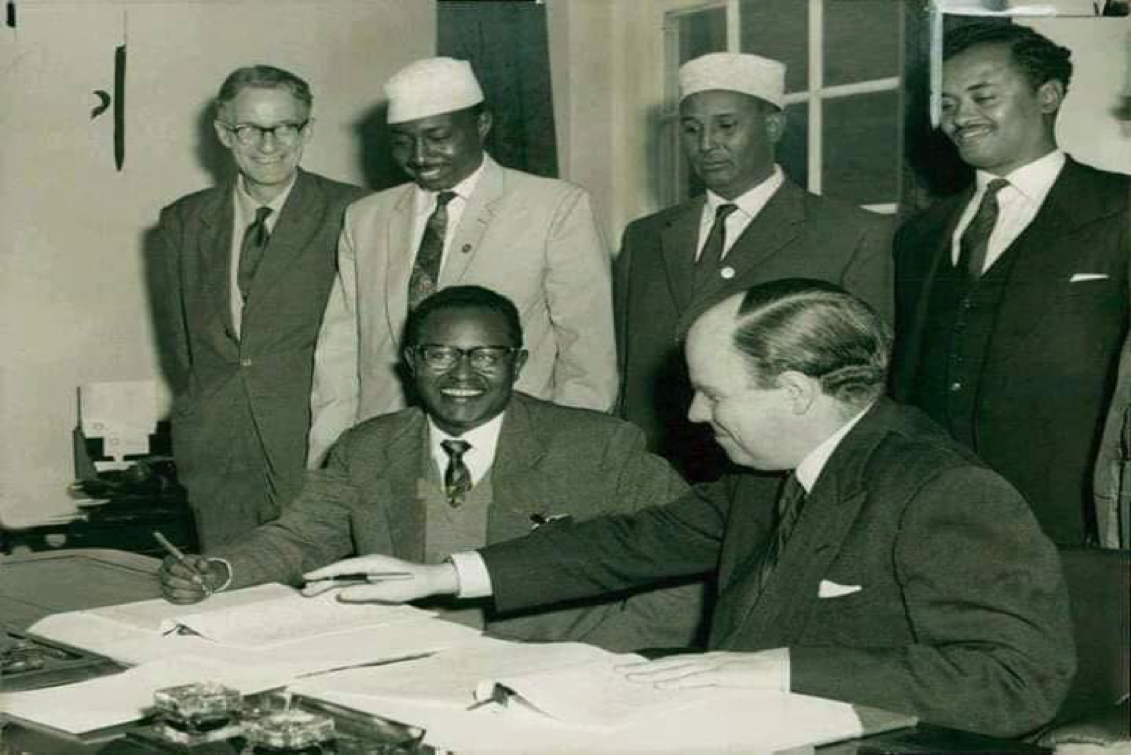
The Somaliland Protectorate Constitutional Conference, London, May 1960

After Somalia’s independence in 1960, successive governments launched a campaign to reclaim what they termed "lost territories," raising the issue with regional and international bodies such as the United Nations. Somali administrations sought to unify these regions under the Somali Republic to realise the vision of Greater Somalia. Tensions between Ethiopia and Somalia escalated, drawing international attention. In February 1964, the Ethiopian-Somali Border War erupted along their shared border. Sudan mediated through the Organization of African Unity, and in the same year, ministers from both nations met in Khartoum, agreeing to a ceasefire and a 15-kilometer military withdrawal on both sides.

In 1966, the Ethiopian government imposed martial law in the Ogaden and neighboring Oromo regions, followed by a number of harsh reprisals against herders to compel them to abandon their support for insurgents. These measures included confiscation of property, arbitrary arrests, control of water points, and destruction of livestock.

A map of the Ogaden region

In 1973, the Western Somali Liberation Front (WSLF) was formed to mobilise local populations in the region. Somalia backed the WSLF, the Somali Abo Liberation Front (SALF), and the Oromo Liberation Front (OLF) to undermine Ethiopian forces and destabilize the country. In 1977, the Ogaden War erupted when the Somali National Army crossed into Ethiopia, conducting military operations in Degehabur, Kebri Dahar, Wardheer, and Gode, and swiftly capturing Jijiga and other areas. The Soviet Union, Cuba, and South Yemen supported Ethiopia’s Derg regime, led by Colonel Mengistu Haile Mariam, deploying nearly 100,000 troops equipped with modern weaponry. This combined force repelled Somali troops back to the border, ultimately weakening the Mogadishu based government. In March 1978, President Siad Barre ordered the withdrawal of Somali forces from Ethiopia.

After the war, an estimated 800,000 "Ethiopian Somalis" crossed the border into Somalia where they would be displaced as refugees for the next 15 years. The defeat of the WSLF and Somali National Army did not result in the pacification of the Ogaden region. The first major outflow of refugees numbering in the hundreds of thousands were also bombed during their exodus out of the country by the Ethiopian military.

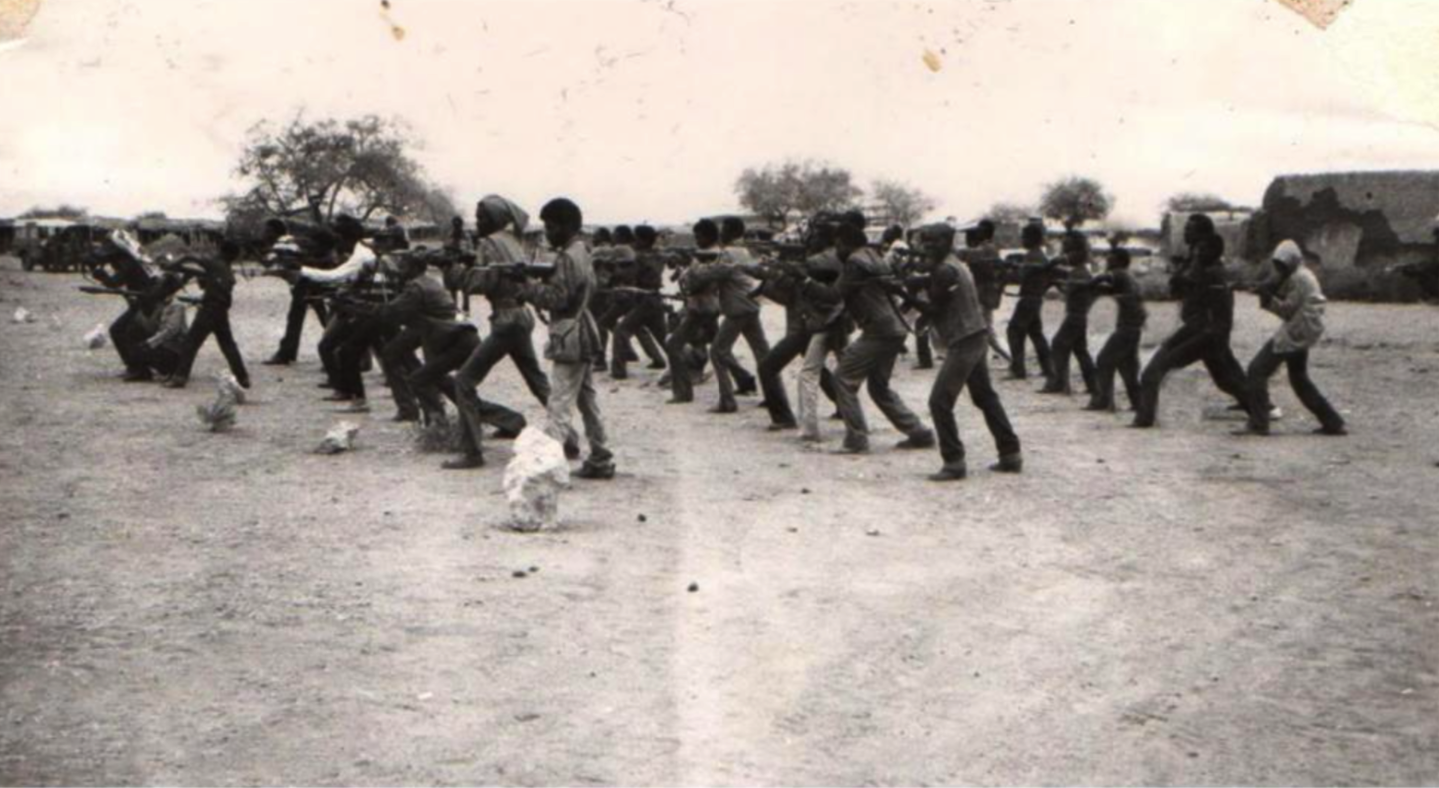
Somali National Movement recruits training for combat in Aware, Ethiopia

After the Derg regime collapsed in May 1991 many Somalis finally returned to Ethiopia after they had evacuated the country in the 1970s and 80s. The Ethiopian People's Revolutionary Democratic Front (EPRDF) set up a transitional government and adopted a federal system. Later, the 1995 Constitution of Ethiopia formalised the creation of nine ethnically based regional states, including the Somali Region to grant more autonomy to the various ethnic groups in the country and to enable these communities to govern their local affairs.

== Demographics ==
The region is home to almost all major Somali clan families with the majority being from the Ogaden subclan of the Darod clan comprising 65% of the total population. Except for Liben and Sitti, the Ogaden clan have a majority presence in all other nine zones. Various subclans of the Darod clan family primarily inhabit the central and eastern parts of the region, with the Ogaden and Jidwaq inhabiting the interior as well as the major towns of Jijiga, Gode, Kebridehar. The Harti clans and the adjacent Geri clan, as well as Leelkase inhabit the Dollo zone where they are a majority while the Marehan clan inhabit the Shilavo woreda and the Liben zone.

The Akisho clan, Issa, Gadabuursi and Jaarso subclans of the Dir primarily inhabit the northern Sitti zone, Awbare and Gursum woreda in Fafan zone.

The Habr Awal, Garhajis, Arap and Habr Je'lo clans of the Isaaq clan family inhabit the northern part of the region bordering Somaliland. The Sacad Muse subclan of the Habr Awal have large settlements in the Fafan Zone where they make up the majority in the Harshin, Hart Sheik, and Wajaale (Ethiopian Side) towns. The Arap inhabit Fafan and also settle and border Kebri Beyah. The Garhajis and Habr Je'lo make up the majority in the Awaare and Misrak Gashamo woredas in Jarar Zone.

Degodia are the majority in Liben Zone and also have a significant presence in neighbouring regions. The Karanle and Sheekhaal clans are present in the western areas bordering the Oromia region and the Hawadle and Habar Gidir subclans are present in the Shabelle zone. The closely related Samaale subclan of Garre are also present in the Liben zone and Dawa zone where they make up the majority.

In 2009, Ethiopia had an estimated 135,000 asylum seekers and refugees, mostly from Somalia (64,000).

== Sources ==
- Drysdale, John (1964). The Somali Dispute. Frederick A. Praeger. OCLC 467147.
