= Bokolmayo =

Bokolmayo (Boqolmayo in Somali, Bokolmayo English) is one of the 96 districts in the Somali Region of Ethiopia. The district is located in the Liben Zone, situated between Filtu and Dollo Ado, the largest town in the Liben Zone. Bokolmayo hosts the highest number of refugees in Ethiopia—nearly 200,000. These refugees are Somalis who fled the civil war in Somalia around early 2009. There are five refugee camps in the Liben zone, three of which are found in Bokolmayo. These refugee camps include:

1. Bokolmayo refugee camp
2. Malkadida refugee camp
3. Kobe refugee camp

Bokolmayo is approximately 95 km west of Dollo Ado, and 140 km east of Filtu. The district lies between two rivers: Dawa and Ganale River.

== Demographics ==
The majority of the population in Bokolmayo are Somalis (99.9%), with the remaining 0.001% consisting of individuals from other Ethiopian nationalities, who have come for professional work or business. Bokolmayo has a population of nearly 110,000, of which: 40% are pastoralists, 20% are agropastoralist, 20% are farmers and 20% are urban dwellers according to Ethiopia's central statistical agency.

The majority ethnic group is Abrisha subclan of dagodia clan from larger Gugundhabe Hawiye clan.

Bokolmayo is the center of culture for dagodia clan and the king of dagodia, Wabar Abdille, resides there.
