= Sathe =

- Location within Ethiopia3°57'06.0"N 41°11'30.0"E
- Coordinates: 03°57′N 41°11′E
- Country: Ethiopia
- Region: Somali
- Zone: Liben
- Time zone: UTC+3 (EAT)

Sathe is a town in Ethiopia.

== Location ==
The town sits north of the Dawa River, directly across the international border with Rhuma, Kenya. Sathe is located in the Liben Zone of the Somali Region of Ethiopia, approximately 935 kilometres (581 mi), by road, southeast of Addis Ababa, the capital and largest city in that country. The coordinates of the town are: 3°57'06.0"N, 41°11'30.0"E (latitude: 3.951676; longitude: 41.191668). Other towns in Liben Zone include Softu and Dolo.

== See also ==
- List of cities and towns in Ethiopia
