= Liben =

Liben may refer to:

- Liben, East Shewa, Oromia, a woreda in Ethiopia
- Liben, East Borana, Oromia, a woreda in Ethiopia
- Liben Zone in the Somali Region of Ethiopia
  - Liben, Somali, a woreda in the Liben Zone
- Libeň, Cadastral area and district of Prague
- Liben, taxonomic abbreviation for the botanist Louis Liben (1926–2006)

== See also ==
- Liban (disambiguation)
