= Filtu (woreda) =

Coordinates: 5°10′N 41°00′E

Filtu (also known as Gindiyeer) is one of the woredas in the Somali Region of Ethiopia. Part of the Liben Zone, Filtu is bordered on the south by the Dawa River which separates it from Moyale and Udet, on the west by the Oromia Region, on the north and east by the Ganale Dorya River which separates it from the Afder Zone, and on the southeast by Dolo Odo. The major town of this woreda is Filtu.

The altitude of this woreda ranges from 200 along the Ganale Dorya, to as high as 1500 meters above sea level.

Liben is located at the frontier between the traditional territories of the Somali and Oromo peoples living in the southwestern part of Ethiopia. Accordingly, local groups of both Somali and Oromo nationalities have a vested interest in the control of the relatively rich pastoral resources in the district and therefore have been in conflict over its control. One attempt to resolve the dispute between the two Regions was the October, 2004 referendum held in about 420 kebeles in 12 woredas across five zones of the Somali Region. According to the official results of the referendum, about 80% of the disputed areas have fallen under Oromia administration, though there were numerous allegations of voting irregularities in many of them.

== Demographics ==
Based on the 2007 Census conducted by the Central Statistical Agency of Ethiopia (CSA), this woreda has a total population of 130,993, of whom 74,537 are men and 56,456 women. While 4,972 or 3.57% are urban inhabitants, a further 92,041 or 70.26% are pastoralists. 99.15% of the population said they were Muslim.

This woreda is entirely inhabited by sub-clans of the Hawadle tribe, specifically the Allagumar clan

The 1997 national census reported a total population for this woreda of 112,465, of whom 63,270 were males and 49,195 were females; 5,518 or 4.91% of its population were urban dwellers. The largest ethnic group reported in Liben was the Somali 112,350 (99.9%).

The majority ethnic group in filtu are Allagumar.

== Agriculture ==
A sample enumeration performed by the CSA in 2001 interviewed 6,195 farmers in this woreda, who held an average of 0.5 hectares of land. Of the 3103 hectares of private land surveyed, 51.79% was under cultivation, 2.03% was pasture, 41.15% fallow, and 5.03% was devoted to other uses; the area in woodland is missing. For the land surveyed in this woreda, 48.66% is planted in cereals like maize and sorghum, and 0.53% in pulses; no area was reported to be planted in root crops or vegetables. Permanent crops included 0.01 hectares planted in fruit trees. 34.41% of the farmers both raise crops and livestock, while 1.47% only grow crops and 64.12% only raise livestock. Land tenure in this woreda was distributed amongst 99.47% owning their land, a negligible number renting, and the remaining 0.53% holding their land under other forms of tenure.
