= Suftu =

Town situated in the border of Ethiopia and Somalia

Suufka ሱፍካ
- Town
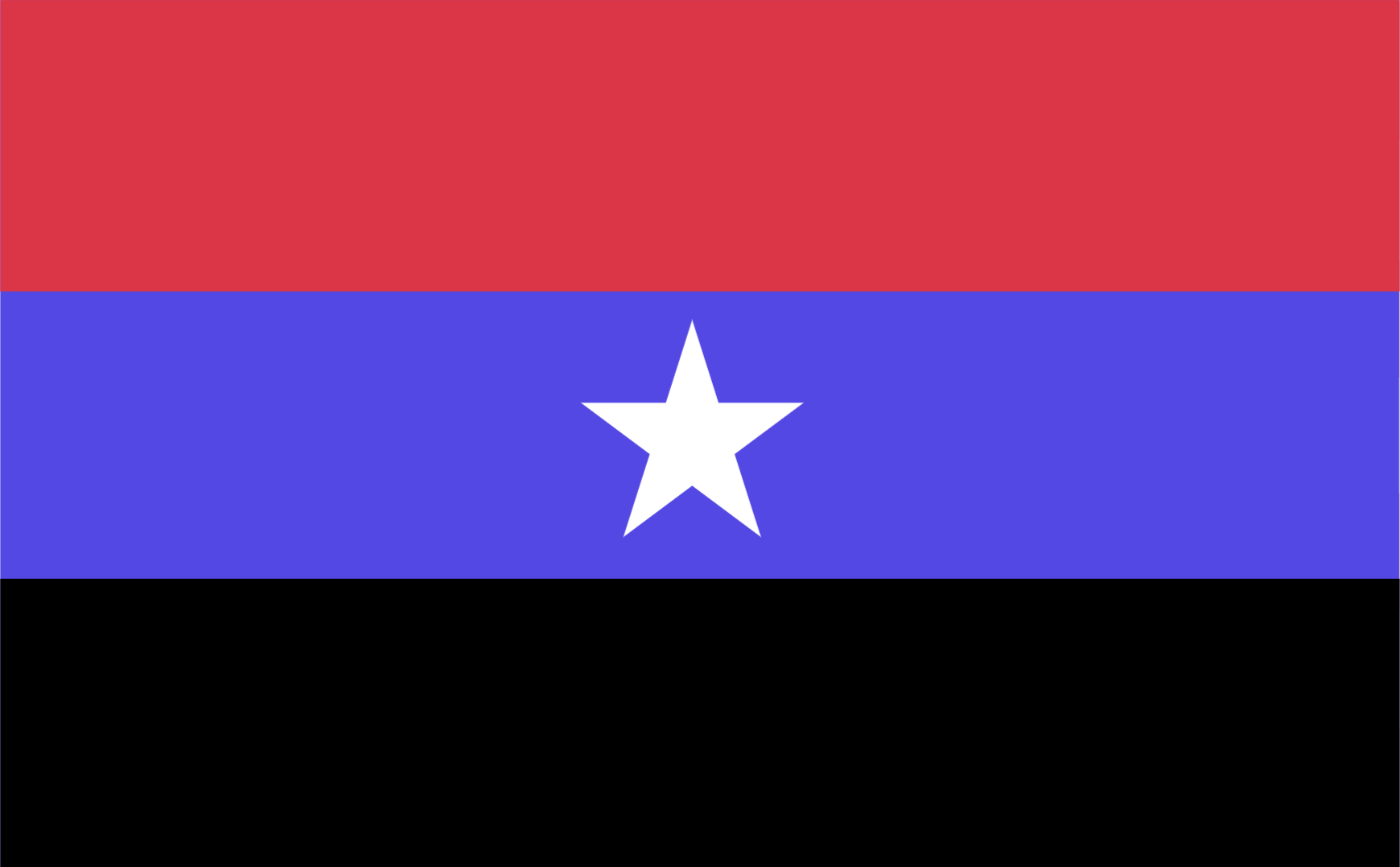
- Flag

- Location in Ethiopia.
- Coordinates: 3°58′18″N 41°51′18″E
- Country: Ethiopia
- Region: Somali
- Zone: Liben
- Woreda: Dolo Odo
- Established: 2015

Population (2006)
  - Total: 25,059
- Time zone: UTC+3 (EAT)
- Area code: 251
- Website: suftu.wordpress.com

Suftu, (Amhric. ሱፍካ) also known as Melka Suftu or Melka Softu, is a town in the Liben Zone of Ethiopia. It is located near the border with southern Somalia and the Mandera County in Kenya. Other towns in Liben Zone include Dolo and Sathe.

== Sports and Achievements ==
Suftu has gained a reputation as a major sports hub in the region. The town has consistently produced skilled athletes who have participated in and won regional tournaments. Despite not having official district status, Suftu's teams have outperformed those from recognized districts, showcasing the town's sporting excellence.

== Demographics ==
Suftu is one of three towns in the Dolo Odo woreda border to Mandera County. Based on figures from the Central Statistical Agency in 2006, this town had an estimated total population of 25,059, of whom 13,366 are men and 11,693 are women. The population has increased since 1997 when it was reported to be 16,801, of whom 8,830 were men and 7,971 women. According to Chatham House, Suftu is inhabited by Somalis From the dagodia tribe.

== Economy ==
Suftu's principal economic activity is pastoralism. Chatham House notes that the town lies along major trading routes in Ethiopia used by Somali livestock merchants, which lead from the western and north-western parts of the country to Mandera in the North Eastern Province of Kenya.

== Education ==
As of November 2013, elementary education in Suftu is served by the Suftu Primary School.

== Transportation ==
Suftu has its own airport, which has a dirt landing area.

== Climate ==
Suftu has a dry climate. It is categorized as semi-arid under the Köppen climate classification (BSh). Temperatures tend to be hot throughout the year.
