= Aw-barre Refugee Camp =

Refuge camp in Ethiopia

- camp
- Location of Aw-Barre town in Ethiopia's Somali Region

- Location in Ethiopia
- Coordinates: 9°47′02″N 42°13′25″E
- Country: Ethiopia
- Region: Somali Region

Population
  - Total: ~11,523 refugees

Aw-barre Refugee camp is located in the Fafan Zone of the Somali Region of Ethiopia. It was established in 2007 by the Ethiopian Administration for Refugee and Returnee Affairs and the United Nations High Commissioner for Refugees (UNHCR) to accommodate Somali refugees seeking international protection and asylum in Ethiopia.

== History ==
Due to the reported influx of Somali refugees to Hart Sheik in late 2006, the Ethiopian Administration for Refugee and Returnee Affairs, in collaboration with the United Nations High Commissioner for Refugees (UNHCR), established a new refugee camp at Awbare on 13 July 2007.

== Demographics ==
As of November 2020, the population of Aw-barre Refugee Camp amounted to 11,523 individuals, with an additional 1,868 households. The camp is predominantly inhabited by the Gadabuursi sub-clan, which belongs to the Dir clan family. As of November 2020, the camp had 11,604 refugees with 5,420 males and 6184 females. The camp had 312 durable shelters as of January 2018.

== Humanitarian response ==
The United Nations High Commissioner for Refugees (UNHCR) provides humanitarian assistance to the refugees and asylum seekers at Aw-barre Refugee Camp. The organization has set up a standard registration system to keep track of the refugees and asylum seekers.

== Services ==
As of January 2018, the camp had one primary, 3 EECD, one Government secondary, two ABE, and one vocational center, one Youth center.

== See also ==
- Bambasi Refugee Camp
- Bokolmayo
- Dolo Odo
