= Liban (disambiguation) =

Liban is the French equivalent for Lebanon, especially in references dating to the French colonial rule of the country. It is also commonly used in official Lebanese publications and on Lebanese stamps. Liban (Somali: Liibaan) is also a Somali given name, meaning victorious.

Liban may also refer to:

== Related to Lebanon ==
- Air Liban or Middle East Airlines, a Lebanese national airline
- Mont-Liban, the French name for Mount Lebanon, a mountain range in Lebanon
- Télé Liban, a Lebanese public television network

=== Political divisions ===
- Mont-Liban, for the Mount Lebanon Governorate
- Liban-Nord, North Governorate
- Liban-Sud, South Governorate

== People ==
=== Given name ===
- Liban Abdi (born 1988), Norwegian football player of Somali origin
- Liban Abdi Egal, Somali entrepreneur and banker
- Liban Hussein, Canadian entrepreneur and businessman
- Liban Abdulahi (born 1995), Dutch professional footballer
- Liban Yusuf Osman, Deputy Minister of Health Development of Somaliland

=== Surname ===
- Abdisalam Haji Ahmed Liban (fl. 2006–2018), Somali diplomat
- Taddasa Liban (fl. 1956), Ethiopian writer
- Mohammed Awale Liban (1919–2001), Somali scholar
- Mohamed Mooge Liibaan (1945–1984), prominent Somali instrumentalist and vocalist
- Ahmed Mooge Liibaan (1943–1997), prominent Somali instrumentalist and vocalist

== Other uses ==
- Lí Ban (mermaid) or Liban, legendary Irish mermaid
- Libáň, a town in Czech Republic
- Liban (or Libán), a village in Suseni, Harghita, Romania
- Liben Zone, a zone in the Somali Region of Ethiopia

== See also ==
- Li Ban (288–334), Chinese monarch
- Lí Ban, Celtic goddess
- Lebanon (disambiguation)
- Liben (disambiguation)
