= Moyale =

Town in Kenya-Ethiopia border

Moyale ሞያሌ
- Town
- Location within Kenya Location within Ethiopia Location within the Horn of Africa Location within Africa
- Coordinates: 3.527°N 39.056°E
- Country: Ethiopia, Kenya
- Region: Oromia; Somali; Marsabit County
- Zone: Borena, Dhawa
- Woreda: Moyale, Moyale
- Elevation: 1,090 m (3,580 ft)

Population (2020)
  - Total: 200,696
- Time zone: UTC+3 (EAT)

Moyale is a border town located on the Kenya–Ethiopia border in eastern Africa. It serves as the administrative centre of Moyale Sub-County in Marsabit County, Kenya, and two districts (Woreda) in Ethiopia, one in Borena Zone, Oromia Region, and the other in Dhawa Zone, Somali Region. The town is an important commercial and transport hub, facilitating cross-border trade between the two countries. As of 2020, Its combined population was estimated at approximately 200,696 inhabitants as per ICRC. It is the largest town of Marsabit County and the 50th largest urban center in Kenya.

Moyale is the main border post on the Nairobi–Addis Ababa road, situated along the southern escarpment of the Borana Plateau, north of the Chalbi Desert. The city is known for its traditional architecture.

== History ==
Moyale was established in the beginning of the 20th century on the other side of an already existing Ethiopian border post. Though separated by a wide valley, the two posts maintained close ties. The British outpost was near Fort Harrington, named after the first British Minister to Ethiopia. This fort, guarded by a small garrison of the King's African Rifles, served as both a military stronghold and an administrative center for a British District Commissioner. Unlike the Ethiopian side, British Moyale had a more reliable water supply, attracting cattle from across the border during the dry season.

An early settler at Moyale was a Greek by the name of Philip Zaphiro, (later to become the British Vice Consul and Oriental Secretary to Ethiopia) who had a station which he had named "Fort Harrington". When C.W. Gwynn visited in 1908, Zaphiro's station consisted of a garden that covered several acres and his house, located on a spur projecting from the Boran highlands, and providing access through the line of cliffs that run along the border. "This route may well become some day a considerable trade artery," Gwynn predicted. "Fort Harrington is therefore well placed as a healthy administrative post and as a possible commercial centre."

During World War II, both parts of the town were captured by Italians from Ethiopia in 1940, and retaken by the British on 15 July 1941.

Tensions rose in the Kenyan side of Moyale in early 1999, after an imam was shot dead during an Ethiopian raid across the Ethiopian-Kenyan border in pursuit of rebels of the Oromo Liberation Front (OLF). The Kenyan residents of the town, held demonstrations condemning the action, which they attributed to Ethiopian security men who believed he was a sympathizer of the OLF.

In November 2009, Ethiopian Prime Minister Meles Zenawi announced plans to extend the Ethiopian railroad to Moyale to facilitate cross-border activities. This would facilitate Kenyan plans, which at the time were at an advanced stage, to develop the port of Lamu and connect it to the Kenyan side of Moyale with a tarmac road.

Moyale town is located at the frontier border between the traditional territories of Oromo peoples and Somalis living in the southwestern part of Ethiopia. Thus this business town is disputed between the two dominant ethnic groups who are Oromos and Somalis. Moyale saw four days of ethnic clashes in July 2012 over a long-standing land dispute between Borana and Garre communities, exacerbated by drought conditions. The fighting left at least eighteen dead, and more than twenty thousand people fled across the border into Kenya.

In March 2018, nine civilians were killed by the Ethiopian National Defense Force (ENDF) near Moyale after being misidentified as Oromo Liberation Front militants. Several soldiers were suspended and a high-level military delegation was dispatched to the area to launch an inquiry.

In March 2026, two Oromo elders in Moyale were kidnapped by masked men. Oromo protestors erected burning barricades along the Sololo-Moyale Highway, demanding an end to abductions. Clashes continued into October, where at least 3 people were injured and a 13 year old girl was killed as a result of an inter-communal dispute over whether the Somali Regional State Flag should be raised. Heavy gunfire between Oromo militia and Somali regional police resulted in the intervention of the Ethiopian National Defense Force. As a result, hundreds of civilians fled from the Ethiopian side to the Kenyan side of Moyale.

== Demographics ==
For the Ethiopian share of Moyale, based on figures from the Central Statistical Agency in 2005, it had an estimated total population of 25,038 of whom 13,665 were men and 11,373 women. The 1994 Ethiopian census reported that the Ethiopian side of Moyale had a total population of 13,962, of whom 7,411 were men and 6,551 were women. (This total also includes an estimate for parts of the town of Moyale, which were not counted; for these parts of the town, it was estimated there were 3,419 inhabitants, of whom 1,752 were men and 1,667 were women.) The six largest ethnic groups reported in Moyale were the Somali (46.25%), Borana (34.25%), the Amhara (8.42%), the Burji (7.75%), the Welayta (1.82%), and the Silt'e (1.28%).

The Kenyan part of Moyale had an urban population of 108,949 during the 2019 census.

== One stop border crossing ==
The trans-African automobile route, the Cairo-Cape Town Highway, passes through Moyale. In June 2021, the one stop border post (OSBP) crossing at Moyale began commercial operations. Officials from both countries sit together in one office and clear passengers and cargo, through immigration, customs, revenue collection and health clearance, saving time. This is the first OSBP for Ethiopia while Kenya maintains four others at Busia and Malaba with Uganda and at Namanga and Taveta with Tanzania.

== Climate ==
Moyale has a hot semi-arid climate (Köppen BSh) moderated somewhat by altitude. Typically for East Africa, there are two rainy seasons: the "long rains" from March to May and the weaker, less reliable "short rains" in October and November.

Climate data for Moyale, Kenya (1958–1994)
Month	Jan	Feb	Mar	Apr	May	Jun	Jul	Aug	Sep	Oct	Nov	Dec	Year
Record high °C (°F)	34.4 (93.9)	35.0 (95.0)	35.0 (95.0)	32.8 (91.0)	30.0 (86.0)	27.8 (82.0)	27.8 (82.0)	28.9 (84.0)	30.6 (87.1)	31.7 (89.1)	31.7 (89.1)	32.2 (90.0)	35.0 (95.0)
Mean daily maximum °C (°F)	30.6 (87.1)	31.1 (88.0)	30.6 (87.1)	27.2 (81.0)	25.0 (77.0)	24.4 (75.9)	23.9 (75.0)	24.4 (75.9)	26.1 (79.0)	26.1 (79.0)	27.2 (81.0)	28.3 (82.9)	27.1 (80.8)
Daily mean °C (°F)	24.5 (76.1)	25.0 (77.0)	24.8 (76.6)	22.7 (72.9)	21.4 (70.5)	20.2 (68.4)	19.7 (67.5)	20.0 (68.0)	21.1 (70.0)	22.2 (72.0)	22.2 (72.0)	23.0 (73.4)	22.3 (72.1)
Mean daily minimum °C (°F)	18.3 (64.9)	18.9 (66.0)	18.9 (66.0)	18.3 (64.9)	17.8 (64.0)	16.1 (61.0)	15.6 (60.1)	15.6 (60.1)	16.1 (61.0)	18.3 (64.9)	17.2 (63.0)	17.8 (64.0)	17.4 (63.3)
Record low °C (°F)	13.9 (57.0)	15.0 (59.0)	14.4 (57.9)	14.4 (57.9)	13.3 (55.9)	12.8 (55.0)	12.2 (54.0)	12.8 (55.0)	13.9 (57.0)	14.4 (57.9)	13.9 (57.0)	13.9 (57.0)	12.2 (54.0)
Average rainfall mm (inches)	10.9 (0.43)	18.5 (0.73)	53.3 (2.10)	176.8 (6.96)	119.6 (4.71)	16.8 (0.66)	16.5 (0.65)	16.5 (0.65)	27.4 (1.08)	95.8 (3.77)	80.8 (3.18)	38.6 (1.52)	671.5 (26.44)
Source: Sistema de Clasificación Bioclimática Mundial
