= Udet (woreda) =

Udet is one of the woredas in the Somali Region of Ethiopia. Part of the Dhawa Zone, Udet is bordered on the south by Moyale, on the west by Liben, Oromia, and on the northeast by the Ganale Dorya River which separates it from Meda Welabu.

== Demographics ==
Based on the 2007 Census conducted by the Central Statistical Agency of Ethiopia (CSA), this woreda has a total population of 43,180, of whom 23,210 are men and 19,970 women. While 4,516 or 10.46% are urban inhabitants, a further 31,178 or 72.21% are pastoralists. 99.35% of the population said they were Muslim. The residents of this town are in the Somalis Garre clan.
