= Garre Marre =

Somali community

Garre Marre (also Garre Marro, Garimaro, Garrimarro) is a Somali clan who live in Ethiopia, Somalia, and Kenya. They inhabit the Dollo, on the southern border of Ethiopia adjacent to northeastern Kenya and Western Somalia, in the Gedo region.

Garremarres are predominantly agropastoralist, and largely depend on farming and keeping small-scale livestock. They are a branch of the main Garre clan of southern Ethiopia, who are also dominant in northern Kenya and western Somalia.
