= Moyale, Somali (woreda) =

District in Somali Region, Ethiopia

Coordinates: 4°10′N 40°05′E

Moyale is a district in the Somali Region of Ethiopia. Located at the extreme southwest corner of the Dhawa Zone, Moyale is bounded on the south by Kenya, on the west by the Oromia Region, on the north by Udet, and on the northeast by the Dawa, which separates Moyale from Filtu. The southernmost point of this woreda is the southernmost point of Ethiopia. Towns in this woreda include Chelago.

The elevations of this woreda range from about 500 meters along the Dawa to 1500 meters above sea level. According to the woreda administrator in 1994, Ibrahim Abdi, the ecological classification of the woreda is 10% mid-highland and 90% lowland. The total farming area in Moyale is 6,649 hectares, and the average land holding capacity is 2 hectares. The major crops planted are maize, teff and navy beans. The farm lands are suitable for sorghum, but it had not been planted as of the end of 1993.

Moyale is located at the frontier between the traditional territories of the Somali and Oromo peoples living in the southwestern part of Ethiopia. Accordingly, local groups of both Somali and Oromo have a vested interest in the control of the relatively rich pastoral resources in the district and have therefore been in conflict over its control. During the mid-1990s there were a number of neutral missions launched by the central government to mediate this long standing conflict. One attempt to resolve the dispute between the two regions was the October, 2004 referendum held in about 420 kebeles in 12 woredas across five zones of the Somali Region. According to the official results of the referendum, about 80% of the disputed areas fell under the Oromia administration, though there has been numerous allegations of voting irregularities.

== Demographics ==
Based on the 2007 Census conducted by the Central Statistical Agency of Ethiopia (CSA), this woreda has a total population of 254,137, of whom 138,790 are men and 115,347 women. While none of total population are urban inhabitants, 101,126 or 39.79% are pastoralists. 99.4% of the population said they were Muslim. The majority of the inhabitants of this woreda belong to the Garre Somali clan.

The 1997 national census reported a total population for this woreda of 226,004, of whom 123,641 were men and 102,363 were women; none of its inhabitants were urban inhabitants. The largest ethnic group reported in Moyale was the Somali 225,946 (99.9%).

== Agriculture ==
A sample enumeration performed by the CSA in 2001 interviewed 8,567 farmers in this woreda who held an average of 0.89 hectares of land. Of the 7,618 hectares of private land surveyed, 11.85% was under cultivation, 39.52% was pasture, 46.65% fallow, and 1.96% was devoted to other uses; the area in woodland is missing. For the land surveyed in this woreda, 7.72% is planted in cereals like maize, and 4.06% in pulses; no area was reported to be planted in root crops or vegetables. Permanent crops included 2.89 hectares planted in fruit trees. 39.73% of the farmers both raise crops and livestock, while 6.05% only grow crops and 54.22% only raise livestock. Land tenure in this woreda was distributed amongst 83.55% owning their land, 0.75 renting, and the remaining 15.7% holding their land under other forms of tenure.
