= Moyale clashes (2012) =

2012 ethnic violence in Ethiopia and Kenya

The Moyale clashes were a series of ethnic clashes between Borana and Garre communities in July 2012 in the area of Moyale, Ethiopia, on the border with Kenya. The fighting appeared to be caused by a long-standing dispute over land possession, exacerbated by recent drought conditions.

Clashes began around 25 July and continued for the next three days. Armed militias reportedly took positions in villages, at which point the fighting spread into Moyale itself. Businesses were shut in Moyale on both sides of the border, and homes in the villages of Chamuki and Shawabarre were reported to have been burnt. On 28 July, the United Nations reported that at least twenty people had been killed in the fighting.

On 28 July, the Kenya Red Cross Society (KRCS) announced that more than 20,000 people had fled into Kenya to escape the fighting. Because of lack of shelter on the Kenyan side of the border, many were sleeping in the open or under tarpaulins provided by the organization.

On 30 July, the Ethiopian government stated that the police had made arrests and the situation was "under control". However, as of that date, the displaced people remained on the Kenyan side of the border, causing the KRCS to issue an urgent plea for humanitarian assistance.
