= Dolo Airport =

Airport in Ethiopia

- IATA: none; ICAO: none

Summary
- Airport type: Public
- Serves: Dolo, Dolo Refugee Camp, Liben Zone
- Elevation AMSL: 625 ft / 191 m
- Coordinates: 4°10′30″N 42°02′00″E

Map
- Location of the airport in Ethiopia

Runways
Direction	Length		Surface
Direction	ft	m	Surface
05/23	5,315	1,620	Gravel
- Source: Google Maps

Dolo Airport is an airport serving Dolo, a town in southeastern Ethiopia, close to the border with Somalia.

The airport was constructed between 2009 and 2012, and supports the UNHCR refugee operations in the area.

The airport lies at an elevation of 625 feet (191 m) above mean sea level.

== See also ==
- Transport in Ethiopia
