= Ethiopia–Kenya border =

International border

The Ethiopia–Kenya border was first identified by the United Kingdom in 1907 and refined in 1947 in the aftermath of the East African Campaign of World War II. When Kenya became independent, it was finally approved in 1970. The border stretches 861 kilometers bounded by Marsabit, Turkana, Wajir and Mandera Counties on the side of Kenya, and Borena and Dhawa Zones in the Ethiopian side. The border features enormous biodiversity and wildlife, most notably, several communities such as Mursi, Nyangatom, Daasanach and Turkana, which are agro-pastoralist in response to harsh climate and erratic weather patterns.

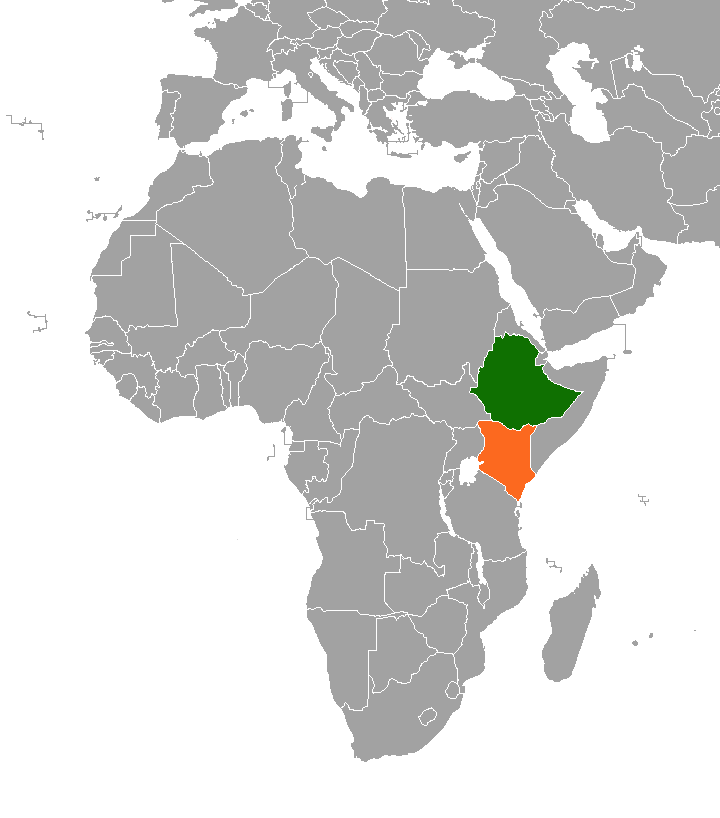
Ethiopia and Kenya in map

Meanwhile, the prevalence of high poverty, poor infrastructure and low literacy and education has been contributed for several conflicts, recurring drought and land degradation resulted from natural resources warfare.

== Overview ==
Ethiopia and Kenya have straddling border stretching 861 km transverse Marasabit, Turkana, Wajir and Mandera Counties on the Kenyan side, and Borena and Dhawa Zones on the Ethiopian side. The border features poor infrastructure, remote from the respective capitals Nairobi and Addis Ababa, and low school enrollment with low literacy rate and high poverty in the area.

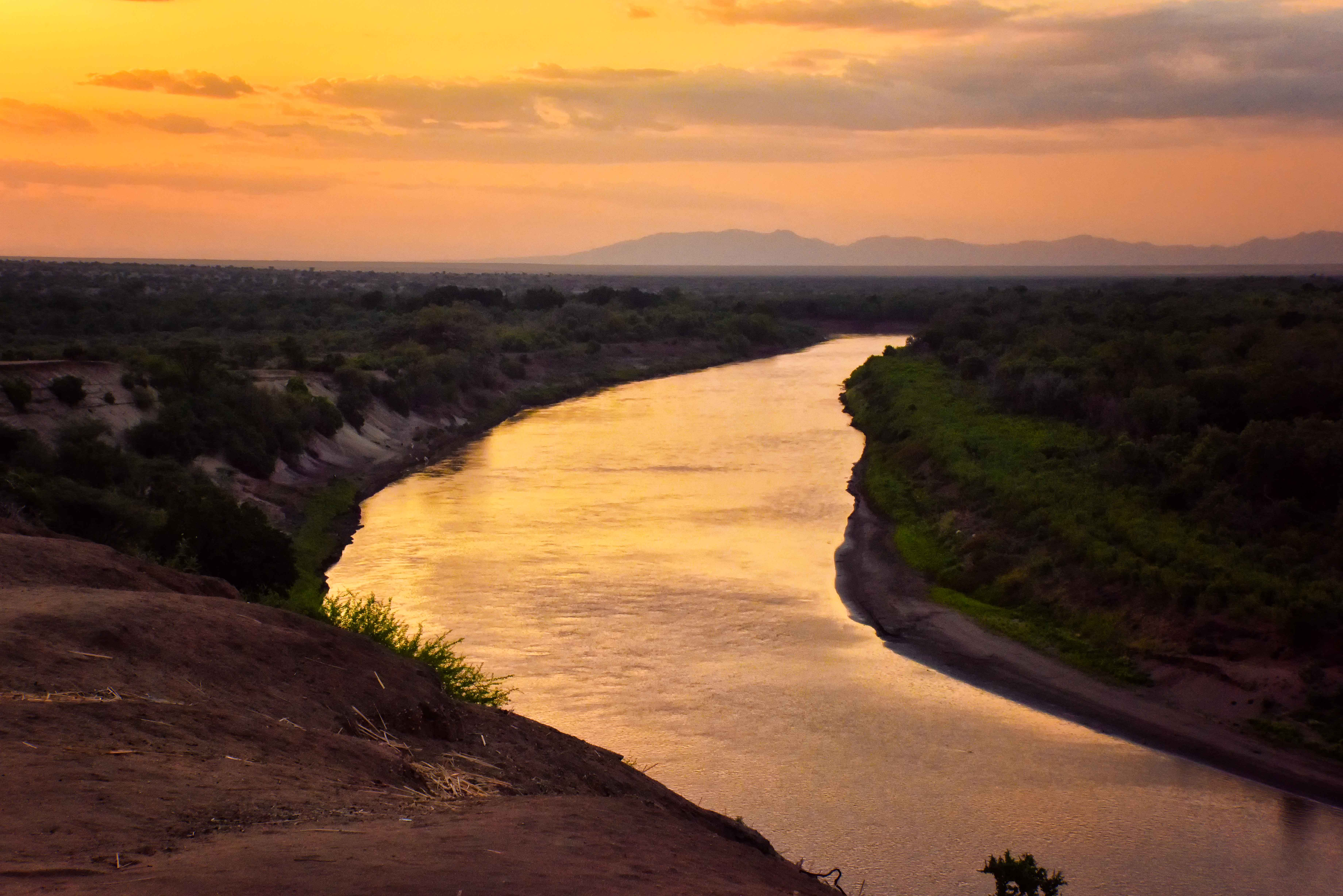
Omo River geographically intercept the Ethiopia–Kenya border

The population in the area is relatively remote, characterized by transversal nomadic movement from both sides or vice versa. These movements lead to potential conflicts over water and pasture. Poverty includes livestock, wildlife, forest, minerals and medical plants, which are essential to the people. Youth population, poverty, inadequate water supply, recurrent drought and the resulting land degradation resulted natural resources warfare and among others. As such, the government of Ethiopia and Kenya developing cross-border program, to customize the community structure and fit-for-purpose solution to the development challenges identified.

The Lower Omo and Turkana region are home of various community such as Mursi, Nyangatom, Daasanach (or Merille) and Turkana, which adopted a nomadic agro-pastoralist way of life in response to harsh climate and erratic weather patterns. Between 1989 and 2011 alone, there were conflicts between Nyangatom, Daasanach and Turkana caused 600 direct people deaths.

The Ethiopia–Kenya border was first identified by the United Kingdom 1907. In 1947, it was redefined and demarcated in 1950s, which finally approved in 1970 by now independent Kenya and Ethiopia.

The Illemi Triangle is tri-junctional point where the Ethiopia and Kenya territories conjoin. This area is significant for dry season pasture that support communities of different countries. On other hands, the area also significant for forage-rich pastures of Ilemi have been cause of war between transhumanist communities of South Sudan, Ethiopia, Uganda, and Kenya.
