= Dolo Ado =

Administrative region in eastern Ethiopia

Coordinates: 4°25′N 41°25′E

Dolo Addo or Dolo Ado or Dollo Ado (Somali: Dooloow) is one of the woredas in the Somali Region of Somalia. Part of the Liben Zone, Dolo Ado is located in the angle formed by the confluence of the Ganale Dorya with the Dawa River, and bordered to the northwest by Filtu, on the northeast by Afder Zone, on the southeast by Somalia, and on the south by Kenya. Towns in Dollo Ado include Koole, Helaweyn, Buur,Hoolmoge and Suftu.

The altitude of this woreda ranges from 200 to 1000 meters above sea level. Other rivers in this woreda include the Mena. As of 2008, Dolo Ado has 120 kilometers of all-weather gravel road and 540 kilometers of community roads; about 58.8% of the total population has access to drinking water.

== History ==
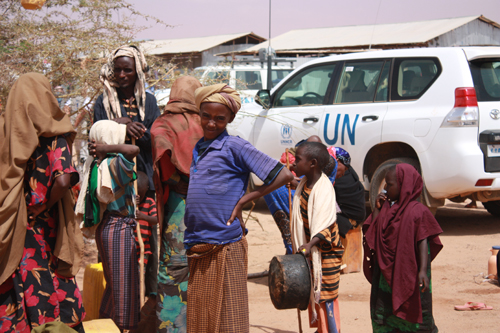
Dolo Ado refugee camp, 2011

Irrigation agriculture was introduced to the riverine inhabitants of this woreda by the Relief and Rehabilitation Commission (RRC) in the late 1970s. While the RRC encouraged this trend with the introduction of three irrigation pumps at selected points, a major impetus were local people who had fled to refugee camps in Somalia during the Ethiopian-Somali war, where they had the opportunity to acquire the basic skills and know-how of irrigation agriculture while participating in irrigation schemes in the Lower Juba River, and returning to Dolo Ado where they put their knowledge to use. These new skills have led to the arable lands on the dry riverbed and the flood plains, which used to be dry season grazing and farming areas for the, Degodia, also becoming attractive to groups of newcomers, which has led to strife between the groups. Mustafa subeyr Abdi and Ahmed Ali Gedi has identified nine conflicts between Degodia sub-clans, who have traditionally had peaceful relations, which resulted in one or more casualties between 1997 and 2005. Furthermore, as the land between the flood plains and riverbanks, which was primarily basin woodlands and dry season pasturage, has been converted to commercial farming, this has caused deforestation and displacement of the original inhabitants.

In June, 2005, Both the Dawa and Ganale Dorya rivers overflowed their banks and flooded Dolo Ado. According to reports, six people died, irrigation pumps were swept away, and hundreds of livestock were drowned.

In November 2008, Dolo Ado was one of the woredas heavily affected by the Ganale Dorya flooding. At least 10,740 people reportedly were displaced, and roads from Dolo to Filtu and Negele Boran were blocked.

In 2012, the Commercial Bank of Ethiopia was established in the town of Dolo Ado.

== Demographics ==
There has been a 30% population increase in 1994 when compared with the recorded population of 4,520 in the 1984 census, and the forecasted figure for 2005 indicates that there would be a 415% increase by the year 2005. Population experts and local leaders attribute this population boom to a number of factors of which the primary one is the large returnee population from neighboring Somalia. The 1997 national census reported a total population for this woreda of 13,412, of whom 7,678 were men and 64,734 were women; 3,301 or 8.39% of its population were urban dwellers. The largest ethnic group reported in Dolo Ado was the Somali 13,987 (96.8%). A study in 2005 categorized the woreda population as follows: 50% of the people are identified as agro-pastoralists, 30% as transhumant pastoralists, 15% as urban and 5% as sedentary farmers. Based on the 2007 Census conducted by the Central Statistical Agency of Ethiopia (CSA), this woreda has a total population of 111,511, of whom 60,778 are men and 50,733 women. While 37,404 or 33.54% are urban inhabitants, a further 33,869 or 30.37% are pastoralists. 95.69% of the population said they were Muslim.

This woreda is primarily inhabited by the Degodia, clan.

== Refugee camps ==
Refugee camps in Dollo Ado. (Map shows the whole Somali Region.)
Bo=Bokolmanyio, Bu=Buramino, Hi=Hilaweyn, Ko=Kobe, Me=Melkadida

There are five refugee camps in the Dollo Ado region housing 219,284 refugees from Somalia:

- Melkadida camp: 34,762
- Kobe camp: 48,164
- Hilaweyn camp: 51,314
- Bokolmanyo camp: 43,084
- Buramino camp: 41,960

The main areas of origin of these refugees are Gedo (53%), Bay (28%) and Bakool (12%) and the main ethnicities are Rahanweyn (58%), Marehan (21%) and Hawiye (9%).

Between June and November 2011, a measles outbreak occurred in a refugee complex in Dolo Ado. Many of the refugees were unvaccinated.

In 2017, with the support of UNHCR, a Dedebit MFI was created in the refugee camp of Dolo Ado.

== Agriculture ==
A sample enumeration performed by the CSA in 2001 interviewed 8,437 farmers in this woreda, who held an average of 0.56 hectares of land. Of the 4,708 hectares of private land surveyed, 27.82% was under cultivation, 7.86% was pasture, 56.78% fallow, 1.06% woodland, and 3.31% was devoted to other uses; the area in woodland is missing. For the land surveyed in this woreda, 24.04% is planted in cereals like maize and sorghum, 1.98% in pulses, 0.53% in root crops, and 0.85% vegetables. Permanent crops included 146.06 hectares planted in fruit trees. 41.2% of the farmers both raise crops and livestock, while 3.35% only grow crops and 55.45% only raise livestock. Land tenure in this woreda was distributed amongst 85.89% owning their land, 3.1% renting, and the remaining 11% holding their land under other forms of tenure.
