= Taddasa Liban =

Ethiopian writer

Tāddasa Lībān is an Ethiopian writer known for the collection Maskaram from 1956. Tāddasa Lībān's stories often involve life in Addis Ababa. Taddasa Liban wrote short stories that examine the relationship between the old and the new in Ethiopian society.
