= Dolo, Ethiopia =

Dolo ዶሎ
- Location within Ethiopia Location within the Horn of Africa Location within Africa
- Coordinates: 4°10′N 42°04′E
- Country: Ethiopia
- Region: Somali
- Zone: Liben

Population (2005)
  - Total: 30,970
- Time zone: UTC+3 (EAT)

Dolo (Amharic: ዶሎ) is a border town in southeastern Ethiopia, within 30 kilometers of the Ethiopia-Somalia border. Located in the Liben Zone of the Somali Region, this town has a latitude and longitude of 04°10′N 42°04′E. The Mena River flows to the northeast.

When a delegation from the UNDP visited the town in February 1994, they reported that an elementary school was present, but not functioning because of a "lack of basic school materials and lack of budget for teachers salary".

== History ==
One of the earliest recorded mentions of Dolo was during Fitawrari Habte Giyorgis's campaign against the Borana, when he reached as far as Dolo in 1896-1897 and founded military garrisons in the region. Dolo was one of the markets on the trade route that stretched from Bardera through Luuq (in modern-day Somalia) to Ginir.

Marshal Rodolfo Graziani started his attack in the Second Italian-Abyssinian War on 4 October 1935 and soon occupied Dolo. In December 1935, the Italians bombed a Swedish run Red Cross center in the Dolo hospital airstrike. He began his major large attack northwards on 10 January 1936. In March 1941, during World War II, the 1st Battalion of the Gold Coast Regiment caught the 20th Brigade of the Italian 101st Colonial Division at Dolo; its commander, staff and 3,000 men surrendered after negligible resistance.

Dolo was one of several border points in the Ogaden where heavy fighting between Somalia and Ethiopia occurred during the first three months of 1964. In December 1972 Tenneco Oil Co. discovered a natural gas deposit yielding 35 cubic feet (0.99 m^{3}) of gas a day at Dolo. This led to the border area between Ethiopia, Somalia and Kenya being considered "politically hot".

== Demographics ==
Based on figures from the Central Statistical Agency in 2005, this town has an estimated total population of 30,970, of whom 16,572 are men and 14,398 are women. The 1997 census reported this town had a total population of 20,762 of whom 10,948 were men and 9,814 women. The largest ethnic group dagodiya and Karanle reported in this town was the Somali (97.97%). It is the largest settlement in Dolo Ado woreda.

== Transportation ==
There is road service to Dolo as well as air service to Addis Ababa from Dolo Airport.

== See also ==
- Dolow
- Dolo Ado
