= Filtu =

Place in Somali Region, Ethiopia

- Nickname: Gindiyeer
- Location within Ethiopia
- Coordinates: 4°58′N 40°23′E
- Country: Ethiopia
- Region: Somali
- Zone: Liben
- Woreda: Filtu

Government
- Elevation: 3,150 m (10,330 ft)

Population (2016 // 2008 Ec)
  - Total: 15,746
- Time zone: UTC+3 (EAT)

Filtu is the capital city of '"Liben Zone"' Filtu (also known as Gindiyeer) is a town in southern Ethiopia. Located in the Liben Zone of the Somali Region, it has a latitude and longitude of 4°58′N 40°23′E with an elevation of 1252 meters above sea level. It is the administrative center of Filtu woreda. During the Italian occupation, a road 115 kilometers in length to Negele Boran was maintained but not paved.

== History ==
In October 1964, Filtu was the scene for one of the perennial conflicts between the Boran and Guji Oromo and their traditional rivals the Somali. The two Oromo clans attacked the Somali north of the Ganale Dorya, stealing or killing much of their livestock and forcing half of them to flee across the river, along with their fellow Muslims the Rayitu, to seek sanctuary around Filtu. The local authorities confined these refugees to a "protected hamlet" and ignored their pleas for help to return to their homes. As their plight worsened, the camp inhabitants started drifting south to Somalia for weapons and training. One group of 40 men, who left for Somalia three months after arriving at Filtu, led by Waqo Gutu, returned the next year to play an important role in the Bale revolt.

During the Ogaden War, the Somali Army had penetrated into southern Sidamo as far as Filtu, which they captured by the end of July 1977, but did not push any deeper. The Ethiopian Fourth Division recaptured Filtu 8 March 1978.

Due to disagreements between local Somali and Oromo groups as well as within those ethnicities, no decision could be made about locating the administrative center for Liben Zone, as well as delaying the formation of a working zonal administration. Therefore, Filtu was appointed to function as an interim administrative center for the Zone by the Transitional Government of Ethiopia during the 1990s.

Ethnic disputes in the years up to (and including) 2002 led to refugees settling around Filtu. Over 800 households came to settle themselves in three camps around this town: two of the camps include people from the Bale Zone in Oromia, and one housed people claiming to come from Liben woreda in Borena Zone in Oromia. These refugees include 300 Degodia households who reported they came from an area south of the Negele Boran-Filtu road and north of the Dawa River, and 243 Wara Dubie and 289 Garre families who came from Dallo Mana. Another 250 Somali families also arrived most of whom came from the Negele Mana area, located on the Welmel River, about 100 kilometers north of Negele Boran.

The Somali People's Democratic Party observed its eleventh anniversary of its founding in Filtu in July 2009, where numerous improvements to the infrastructure of the Liben Zone were announced.

== Demographics ==
Based on figures from the Central Statistical Agency of Ethiopia published in 2005, Filtu has an estimated total population of 11,738 of whom 3,496 are men and 8,242 women. The 1997 census reported this town had a total population of 5,518 of whom 3,135 were men and 2,383 women. The largest ethnic group reported in this town was the Hawadle and Degodi Somali clan (98.26%).

== Ecology ==
Filtu is a historical location of habitat for the endangered African wild dog, Lycaon pictus, whose local survival is in question due to the ongoing encroachment on habitat by the expanding human population.
