= Jubba Basin =

Goobweyn Hoose
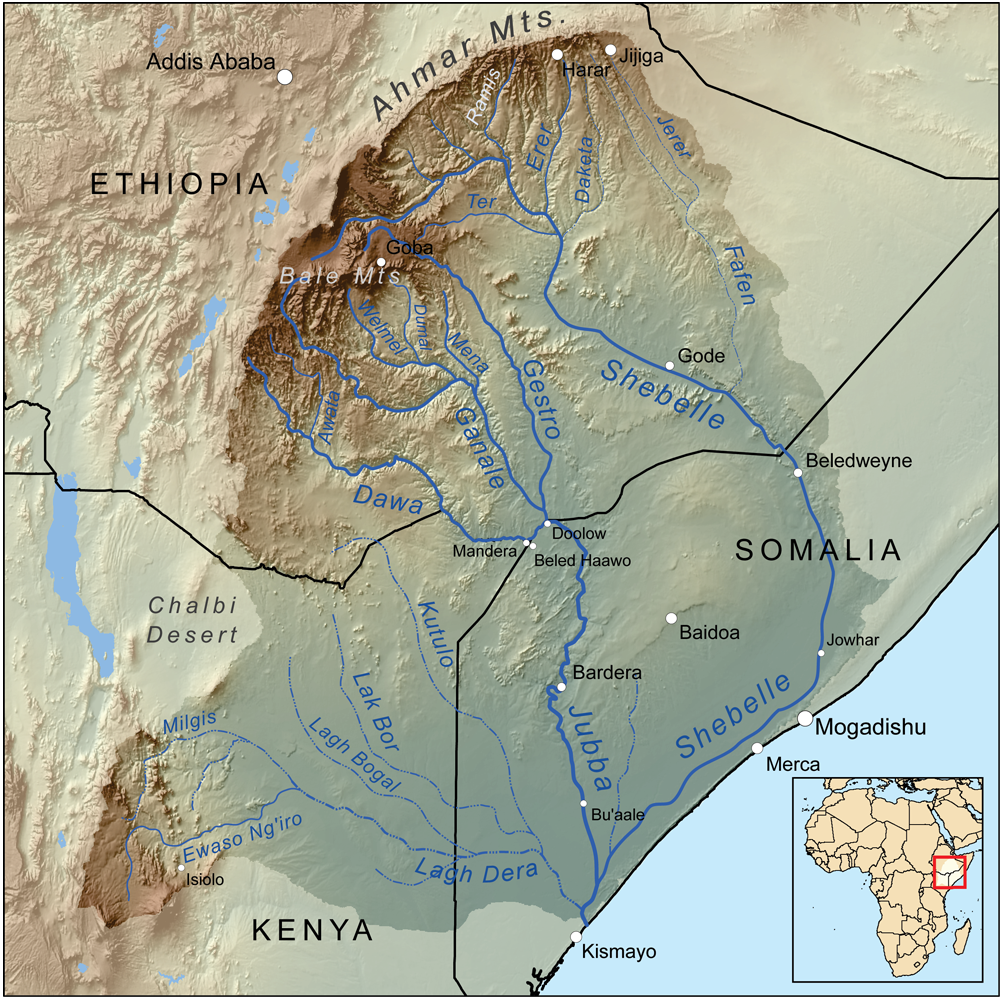
- Map of the Jubba/Shebelle drainage basin

- Location within Somalia
- Location: Jubaland
- Coordinates: 0°15′S 42°38′E
- Type: Delta, Estuary
- River sources: Jubba River
- Basin countries: Somalia

The Jubba Basin, also called Goobweyn Hoose, is a drainage outlet in Jubaland, Somalia and is the point at which the River Jubba meets the Somali Sea. Since the Shebelle River's outlet joins Jubba as a tributary, it is also the outlet of the Shebelle River.

== History ==
Due to tree-cutting at the mouth of the basin, concerns have been raised about the sustainability of the ecology in the area. Goobweyn is located 14km north of Kismaayo, the economic capital of Jubaland. During the 1990s, the SPM Harti previously held a base in the Goobweyn region, and it was this faction which would go on to create Jubaland, which it saw as a revival of the former British Jubaland.

== See also ==
- Shebelle River
