= Liben, East Borana, Oromia =

One of the woredas in the Oromia Region of Ethiopia

Coordinates: 5°15′N 39°30′E

Liben is one of the woredas in the Oromia Region of Ethiopia. Part of the East Borana Zone, Liben is bordered on the west by Goro Dola, on the south by Gumi Eldalo, on the north by the Ganale Dorya River which separates it from Meda Welabu, and on the east by the Somali Region. Liben woreda surrounds the town of Negele Borana, which was separated from Liben.

== Overview ==
The altitude of this woreda ranges from 1120 to 1600 meters above sea level. Rivers include the Awata. State forests include the Genale, Dawa and Hara Kalo. A 2004 survey of the land in this woreda shows that 9.68% is arable or cultivable, 88.5% pasture, 0.93% forest, and the remaining 0.87% is considered swampy, degraded or otherwise unusable. Cereals include corn, wheat, teff, barley and sorghum; sugar cane, banana and papaya are other important crops.

Industry in the woreda includes 20 grain mills, 5 metal or wood works, and 2 brick or tube factories. There were 34 Farmers Associations and 8 Farmers Service Cooperatives. Liben has 51 kilometers of dry-weather and 198 all-weather road, for an average road density of 73 kilometers per 1000 square kilometers. About 7.2% of the rural and 42.2% of the urban population has access to drinking water.

In 1994, the Oromo Relief Association organized food-for-work activities in 17 kebeles of Liben to lessen the effects of that year's drought; these activities included making improvements to traditional wells and ponds, road construction, and school maintenance.

This woreda was part of the Borena Zone until it, along with four other woredas, were split off in September 2003 to create the Guji Zone. In March 2023, Liben along with Gumi Eldalo, Goro Dola, and Negele town were separated again from Guji Zone and made part of the new East Borana Zone.

== Demographics ==
The 2007 national census reported a total population for this woreda of 138,813, of whom 70,130 were men and 68,683 were women; 1,385 or 1% of its population were urban dwellers. The majority of the inhabitants said they were Muslim, with 59.45% of the population reporting they observed this belief, while 21.07% of the population practiced traditional beliefs, 15.61% were Protestant, and 1.73% practiced Ethiopian Orthodox Christianity.

Based on figures published by the Central Statistical Agency in 2005, this woreda has an estimated total population of 163,869, of whom 80,653 were males and 83,216 were females; 44,831 or 27.36% of its population are urban dwellers, which is greater than the Zone average of 11.6%. With an estimated area of 22,007.04 square kilometers, Liben has an estimated population density of 7.4 people per square kilometer, which is less than the Zone average of 21.1.

The 1994 national census reported a total population for this woreda of 111,696, of whom 56,568 were men and 55,128 women; 25,046 or 22.42% of its population were urban dwellers at the time. The four largest ethnic groups reported in Liben were the Oromo (71.98%), the Somali (16.21%), the Amhara (8.01%), and the Tigray (0.98%); all other ethnic groups made up 2.82% of the population. Oromiffa was spoken as a first language by 69.37%, 16.08% spoke Somali, and 12.99% spoke Amharic; the remaining 1.56% spoke all other primary languages reported. The majority of the inhabitants were Muslim, with 60.22% of the population reporting they practiced that belief, while 14.75% of the population said they Ethiopian Orthodox Christianity, 13.35% professed practiced traditional beliefs, 7.94% were Protestant, and 0.95% were Catholic.
