= Dhawa Zone =

Zone in Somali Region of Ethiopia

Daawa Zone Gobolka Daawa
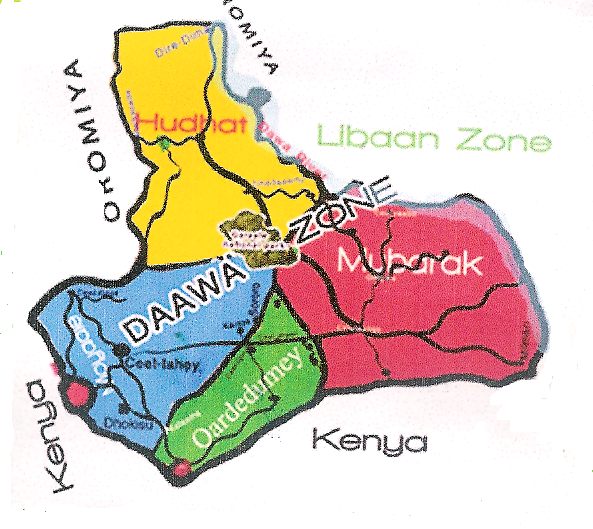
- Map of Dhawa zone
- Country: Ethiopia
- Region: Somali
- Zone: Dhawa
- Capital: El Leh

Population (2018)
  - Total: 1,283,546
- Time zone: UTC+3 (EAT)

Dawa (Somali: Dhawa) is a zone in Somali Region of Ethiopia.. Daawa is bordered on the south by Kenya, on the northwest by the Oromia Region, on the northeast by Liban. Towns in Daawa zone include Mubarak, Mooyaale, Hudet, Kedaduma and Lahey.

== See also ==
- List of zones of Ethiopia
