= Dawa River =

Dawaro River
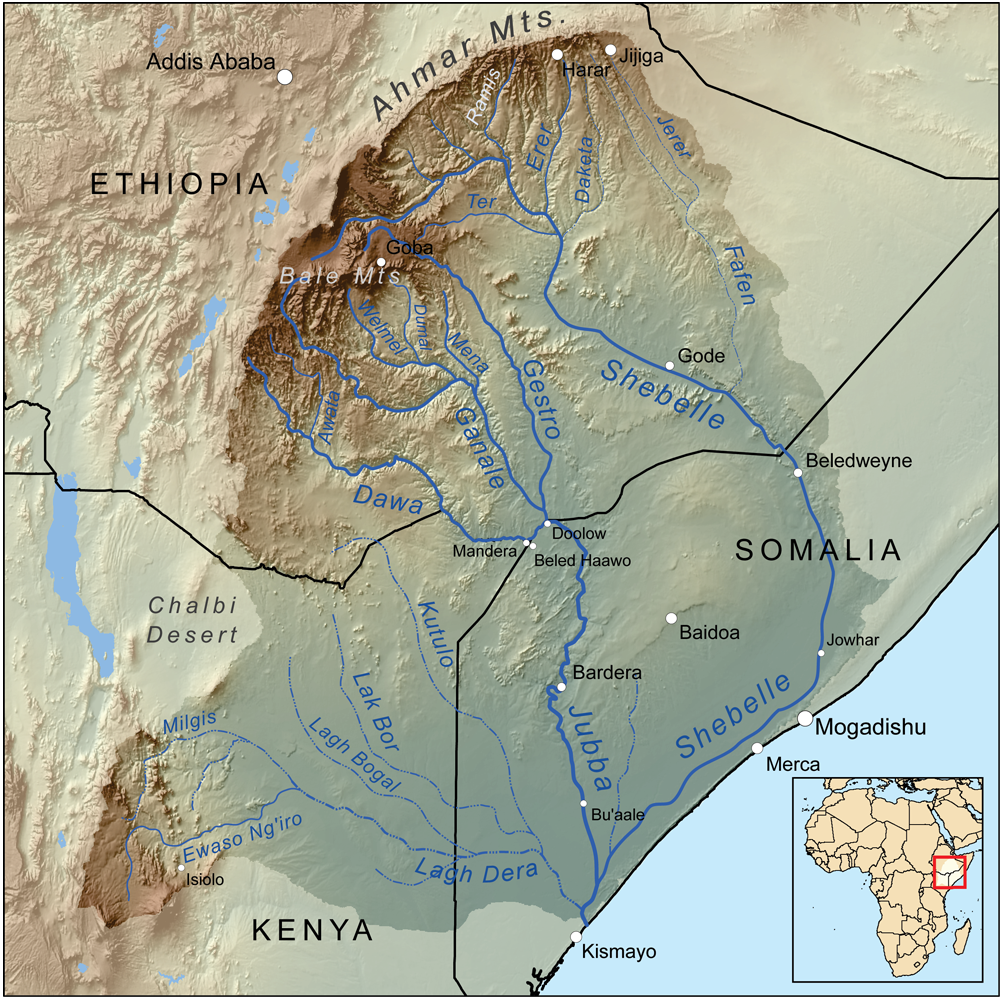
- Map of the Dawaro River
- Native name: ዳዋ ወንዝ (Amharic); Webiga Daawa (Somali)

Location
- Countries: Ethiopia; Somalia; Kenya

Physical characteristics
- Source: Ethiopian Highlands
  - coordinates: 6°15′12″N 38°25′47″E
  - elevation: 2,845 m (9,334 ft)
- Mouth: Jubba River
  - location: Dolow
  - coordinates: 4°10′39″N 42°04′47″E
  - elevation: 174 m (571 ft)
- Length: 751 km (467 mi)
- Basin size: 58,961–60,316 km^{2} (22,765–23,288 sq mi)
- Discharge
  - location: Mouth
  - average: 144.6 m^{3}/s (5,110 cu ft/s)
  - minimum: 32.51 m^{3}/s (1,148 cu ft/s)
  - maximum: 479.1 m^{3}/s (16,920 cu ft/s)

Basin features
- Progression: Jubba → Somali Sea
- River system: Jubba Basin
- Cities: Mandera, Dolow
- Population: 2,840,000
- Tributaries
  - left: Awata

The Dawa River (Somali: Webiga Daawa; Laga Daawwaa(Oromo) Italian: fiume Daua) is found in East Africa, covering an area of 58,961 km^{2}. It flows through three major countries: Kenya, Ethiopia, and Somalia, with 81% found in Ethiopian territory. It is known for its complex geological environment, evident through its diverse lithology and structural framework, coming from the river's closeness to multiple volcanic-tectonic events. The wide river has gentle slopes either side of its exposed bedrock. The Dawa river flows south east to form part of both the Ethiopia–Somalia border and the Ethiopia–Kenya border. Awata, Digati, and Mormora are the only significant off-flowing rivers to Dawa.

== Location and physiography ==
The Dawa river has a maximum and minimum elevation above sea level of 3,098 metres or 10,164 feet and 169 metres or 554 feet respectively. The inclination of the basin is toward the southeast. The exact location is between 3.92°- 6.47° N and 38.02°- 42.08° E. A significant proportion of the area in the northern and north-western highland is distinguished by ridges and gorges, whilst the south and southeast contour is distinguished by levelled ground, low relief, long valleys, spotted hills and steep ground parallel to the main river. The Dawa River encompasses a cool zone, a temperate zone and hot lowlands, these are the three major climatic zones of the country. The Ethiopian National Meteorology Agency collected monthly rainfall from 1996 to 2016 and found that there is a vast difference between the high rainfall areas, which include the cooler highland area, and low rainfall in the hot lowland areas of the Dawa river. Mean average rainfall is about 1,500 millimetres or 60 inches at the northern end and decreases parallel to elevation to 200 millimetres or 8 inches near the river outlet at the southern end. The annual mean temperature is about 15.5 °C or 59.9 °F in the northern end and 28 °C or 82.4 °F towards the southern end. Groundwater is typically cold with temperature ranging from 17.1 to 29.0 °C (62.8 to 84.2 °F). For each terrain, the overall water quality ranges greatly, with higher salinity in sedimentary terrains than in volcanic terrains.

== Geological complex ==
The Dawa river is known for its unique geological setting. It has a diversified lithology and structural framework, formed as a result of the basin's location in close proximity to multiple volcanic-tectonic events. Typically, along the river, the basement complex is laterally positioned in the middle parts of the basin, in between the northwest highland, volcanic rocks and the southeast lowland extensive sedimentary formation. Sedimentary arrangement covers southwestern parts of the Dawa River. The sediment Karoo, which is oldest unit in the sequence and composed of sandstone and shale is overlain by Adigrat Sandstone. Oldest to Cretaceous sedimentary arrangements overlay the Adigrat sandstone. Field observations and drilling's in the area indicate that the formation is highly fractured, which leads to a favourable formation for groundwater to occur and move. The newer formations are dominated by impermeable units that inhibit groundwater movement, such as marble and shale. In one part of the Dawa River, there is a thick impermeable section that cover the Hamanlie formation and put this potential water producer beyond a depth affordable for the typical community water well drilling. Overall, the older rocks are penetrative and absorbent, as a result receiving and transmitting significant amounts of water. However, the newer rocks are impermeable and act as a barrier to the vertical flow of water. Groundwater movement is controlled by facture orientations and generally flows toward southeast. In the humid highland regions, the flow of water occurs directly from local rainfall and groundwater discharges, mostly as springs. On the other hand, in the Semiarid region in the southeast, water occurs indirectly from flash floods and following extreme rainfall periods, from shallow groundwater in the wadi beds. In most cases, groundwater extraction by communities occurs artificially through the hydroelectrical power plant, or simple well drilling.

=== Volcanic events ===
The river has Precambrian basement rocks, Mesozoic sedimentary creation, tertiary volcanic rocks and quaternary alluvial deposit. In the volcanic terrain, groundwater is at its most dilute, while the salinity is the highest in the sedimentary terrain.

== Wildlife ==
The Dawa River is home to thousands of animals and plants, as a number of seasonal rivers and streams feed into the river. The largest trees in the riverine forest are located along the lower section of the Dawa River. These include: Diospyros Mespliformis, Ficus sycamorus, Mimusops kummel, Tamarindus indica and African mahogany Trichilia emetica. Shrubs of Ficus capreaefolia cover most of the river bank, while bushland and thickets cover most of the wachile plain. Most of the wildlife remains scarce during the long dry season making plants such as Acokanthera schimperi, Dobera glabra, Euclea racemosa schimperi and Salvadora persica abundant and visible. Borena people have developed the skills of farming cattle and sheep as a result of the crops being too dry to grow over the extended dry season.

A mixture of grassland and woodland cover the region of the Dawa River. Vegetation consists of a mixture of perennial grasses, forbs and woody vegetation. There are a number of indigenous species of grasses and woody plants that provide high quality forage, giving a high nutritional value to the plants for the surrounding people. During the dry season, the plants still alive retain higher crude protein than grasses. The distribution of plants depends on the elevation, precipitation, temperature and soil types.

When looking at the three climatic zones, there is a different plant and animal species existing in the environment. In the cold highlands the number of herbivores is few because of the temperature constraint. In the hot lowlands the number of herbivores is also few because of the rainfall and water shortage. In the sub-tropic temperature region, there is a higher herbivore population as well as having a high human population. A study from the Simons foundation project based in Botswana International University examined the impact of rainfall and temperature on the growth rate of plants surrounding the hot low-lying lands of the Dawa River and concluded that if rainfall decreases by 1.5% then the herbivore population will disappear in the lowland zone and go extinct or migrate to other regions.

=== Drought ===
The Dawa River, flows through the Somali region where this region and many more have experienced a complete drought of the river for over 3 years. Which once was characterised by water flowing through the river, it now has exposed hot and dry soil, with no plants growing and animals unable to be fed. This has left Somalia and neighbouring countries on the brink of a humanitarian disaster. When the river dries out, communities are unable to cultivate the fields, fish, use plants surrounding the river for food and most importantly access fresh water. This leaves more than half of Somalia's population of 6.2 million people, in urgent need of food and water that was once provided by the Dawa River.

== Use of the river ==
Locating quality groundwater is a challenge in most parts of the basin. Over time, the people have been utilising and developing the Dawa River to become a great source of water and energy for the communities surrounding it. With future expected population growth, more water will be demanded.

=== Hydroelectric power plant ===
Ethiopia, Somalia and Kenya on 14 November 2014 agreed to construct a multipurpose dam and a hydro power station on the River Dawa. The project was initially launched in 2010 but received setbacks due to issues related to the resettlement of residents living close to the Dam. Due to the challenge in locating quality groundwater most of the year, the proposal sought to solve the persistent drought that covered the region surrounding the Dawa river.

In February 2020, Ethiopia inaugurated the Genale Dawa III hydroelectric power plant. This development will help increase the surrounding country's electric power capacity to 4654 MW, while also enhancing the economic benefits of Dawa communities through increasing irrigation development. The 110-metre-high and 426-metre-long dam has the capacity to hold 2.5 billion cubic meters of water.

The hydroelectric plant received a total investment outlay of US$451 million and was built by a Chinese firm called the China Gezhouba Group. Ethiopian Prime Minister Abiy Ahmed claims that "the expansion of irrigation development will enable Ethiopian and surrounding communities to sustain food security.".

While each country surrounding the hydroelectric power plant has its own interests and needs, there has not been a trilateral agreement surrounding cooperation over the rivers’ usage. The cooperation surrounding its usage has been shaped by domestic interests and interstate tensions. However, the possibility of interstate conflict due to these tensions is low, due to Ethiopia's comparative advantage with its military, geographically, economically and its diplomatic influence.

=== Irrigated farming ===
Irrigated farming and land cultivation has been used by communities along the Dawa River, mainly the Borona pastoralists, since 1983/84, specifically, households in Hadhessa and Qorati. The tribe Gada of Liben Jaldessa started using it in 2000. In 2008, Irrigated farming, specifically using motorized pumps, expanded along the Dawa River and was used by the Borona Pastoralists in Liben. The government in the last 10–20 years has encouraged irrigated farming along the Dawa River due to the severe droughts, and declining livestock numbers that impacted all communities across the country. Originally tribes / communities had abundances of cattle and land cultivation was forbidden until 1972. Now people have developed the skill of farming using the river sources, hence the utilization of the Dawa River for irrigated farming. There are small ponds built by the local people to provide water over a wide area for their animals. Communities around the Dawa River have to dig deep wells that tap underground water. These wells provide more than four-fifths of the total accessible water during the dry season. Drawing from the wells is labour-intensive, and is a social and economic significance to the regions pastoralists. In addition to this important economic activity throughout the dry southern parts of Borena, the communities collect gums and resins from trees of Commiphora and Boswellia. Conflicts between ethnic groups surrounding the Dawa River are generally concerning the grazing lands and water rights. With the increase in frequency of droughts occurring now every 1 to 2 years, this causes the death of many more livestock. This has led to a further increase in land cultivation among the poorer tribes and communities.

== Gold discovery ==
Dawa River has been a sight of gold discoveries over history. Along the Dawa River, gold has been found between Awata and Kokowa effluents. The lower part of the river has been classed as having a relatively young erosion cycle, this valley is relatively wide, with gentle slopes either side has exposed bedrock. The exposed bedrock allowed a Texas Africa Exploration Co. geologist in 1958 to discover titanium minerals and ilmenite in the river. The discovery of titanium and ilmenite led to the discovery in 1958–59 of gold, this in turn made it possible to increase gold exploitation in the Dawa area for ventures across the globe. This was an important aspect of the Dawa River in the past, however in current times the importance of the River has shifted to supplying water to surrounding communities.

== Bibliography ==
1. Woldemariyam, F., Ayenew, T 2016, ‘Application of hydro chemical and isotopic techniques to understand groundwater recharge and flow systems in the Dawa River basin, southern Ethiopia’, Environ Earth Sci 75, 1002
2. Woldemariyam, F., Ayenew, T 2016. ‘Identification of hydrogeochemical processes in groundwater of Dawa River basin, southern Ethiopia’. Environ Monit Assess 188, 481
3. Manalebish Debalike Asfaw, Semu Mitiku Kassa, Lungu, E. and Woldeamlak Bewket, 2019. ‘Effects of temperature and rainfall in plant–herbivore interactions at different altitude’. Ecological Modelling, 406, pp. 50–59
4. Serur, A. and Sarma, A., 2017. ‘Current and projected water demand and water availability estimates under climate change scenarios in the Weyib River basin in Bale mountainous area of South-eastern Ethiopia’. Theoretical and Applied Climatology, 133(3-4), pp. 727–735
5. Boru, D., Schwartz, M., Kam, M. and Degen, A., 2015. ‘Effects of Family Size and Wealth on Size of Land Cultivated by Borana Pastoralists in Southern Ethiopia’. Human Ecology, 43(1), pp. 15–28
6. Construction Review Online. 2020. Ethiopia Inaugurates Genale Dawa III Hydroelectric Power Plant. Available at: https://constructionreviewonline.com/2020/02/ethiopia-inaugurates-genale-dawa-iii-hydroelectric-power-plant/ [Accessed 23 March 2020].
7. Nai.uu.se. 2020. Local History Of Ethiopia : Daoierri - Dearo Tekle. Available at: https://nai.uu.se/library/resources/thematic-resources/local-history-of-ethiopia.html [Accessed 23 March 2020]
8. Commons.wikimedia.org. 2010. File:Jubbarivermap.Png - Wikimedia Commons. Available at: https://commons.wikimedia.org/wiki/File:Jubbarivermap.png [Accessed 22 April 2020].
9. Datazone.birdlife.org. 2020. Birdlife Data Zone. Available at: http://datazone.birdlife.org/site/factsheet/dawa--wachile-iba-ethiopia [Accessed 15 May 2020].
10. Sipri.org. 2020. WATER SECURITY AND GOVERNANCE IN THE HORN OF AFRICA. Available at: https://www.sipri.org/sites/default/files/2020-03/sipripp54_0.pdf [Accessed 17 May 2020].
11. Drc.ngo. 2020. When The River Dries Out All Life Disappears | DRC. Available at: https://drc.ngo/news/when-the-river-dries-out-all-life-disappears%5B%5D [Accessed 16 May 2020].
12. KEBBEDE, G., 2018. ENVIRONMENT AND SOCIETY IN ETHIOPIA. [Place of publication not identified]: ROUTLEDGE.
