= Liben Zone =

Zone in Somali Region of Ethiopia

Coordinates: 4°45′N 40°30′E

Liben Zone Gobolka Liiben, Degodia Liiben
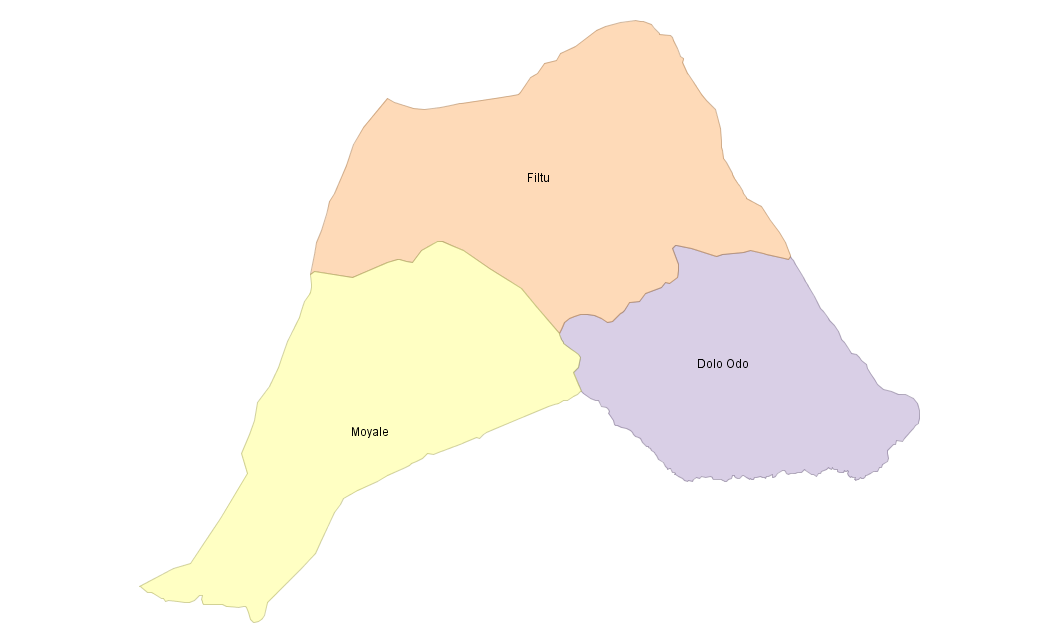
- Map of Liben Zone

- Map of Somali Region
- Country: Ethiopia
- Region: Somali
- Zone: Liben
- Capital: Filtu

Population (2014)
  - Total: 1,539,820
- Time zone: UTC+3 (EAT)

Liben (Somali: Liiban) is a zone in Somali Region of Ethiopia. Liben is bordered on the south by Kenya, on the northwest by the Oromia Region, on the northeast by Afder, and on the southeast by Somalia's federal state of Jubaland. Towns in Liben zone include Filtu, Gof Bokolmayo, Deka Suftu, and Dolo. Borena National Park covers the southwestern portion of the zone.

== Demographics ==
Based on the 2007 Census conducted by the Central Statistical Agency of Ethiopia (CSA), this Zone has a total population of 539,820 in 2014 of whom 290,850 are men and 248,970 women. While 46,892 or 8.69% are urban inhabitants, a further 258,214 or 47.83% were pastoralists. The largest ethnic group reported in Liban zone was the Somalis (99.55%); all other ethnic groups made up 0.45% of the population. Somali language is spoken as a first language by 99.52%; the remaining 0.48% spoke all other primary languages reported. 98.57% of the population said they were Muslim.

There are five refugee camps housing 174,463 refugees from Somalia, located in Liben Zone.

The 1997 national census reported a total population for this zone of 476,881 in 72,010 households, of whom 260,589 were men and 216,292 were women; 44,819 or 9.1% of its population were urban dwellers. The largest ethnic group reported in Liben was the Somali (99.04%); a slightly smaller share spoke Somali (97.78%). Only 12,085 or 7.72% were literate.

Map of the regions and zones of Ethiopia

== Development ==
The Liben Zone has various social and economic ties with Somalia and the adjacent Somali populated North Eastern Province of Kenya.

Liben Zone is known for Camels that are exported to Arabia through ports in mombasa Mogadishu, most importantly Djibouti. On the other hand, cattle and small ruminants are taken across the border and traded in livestock markets located in Kenya.

According to a May 24, 2004 World Bank memorandum, 3% of the inhabitants of Liben have access to electricity, this zone has a road density of 12.6 kilometers per 1000 square kilometers. 28.2% of the population is in non-farm related jobs, compared to the national average of 25% and an average of 28% for pastoral regions. 23% of all eligible children are enrolled in primary school, and none in secondary schools. 100% of the zone is exposed to malaria, and none to Tsetse fly. The memorandum gave this zone a drought risk rating of 571.
