= Abudwak Maternity and Children's Hospital =

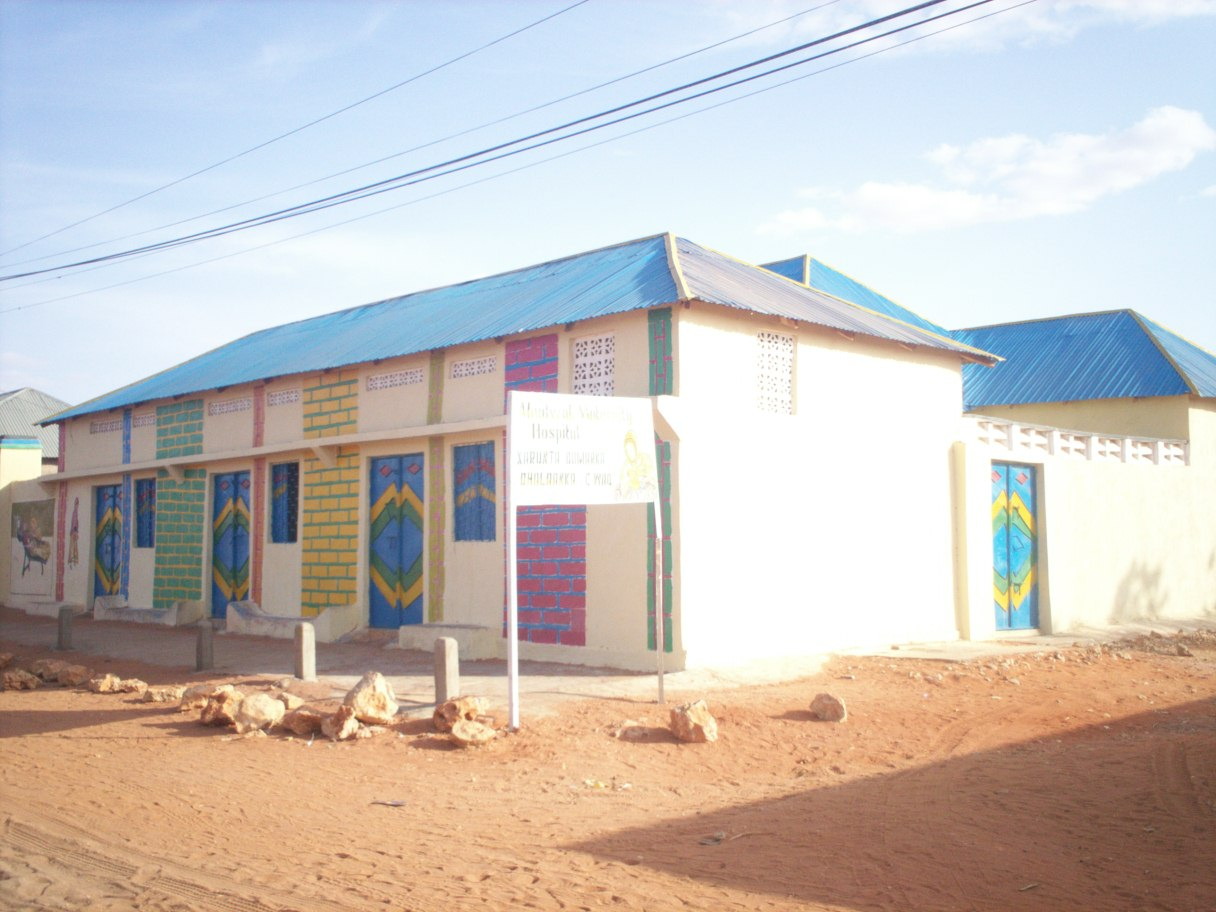
- Abudwak Maternity and Children's Hospital

Geography
- Location: Abudwak, Galgaduud, Somalia
- Coordinates: 6.246896°N 46.224160°E (approximate)

Organisation
- Type: Maternity, Children's

Services
- Beds: 10

History
- Founded: 2009

Links
- Lists: Hospitals in Somalia
- Other links: Maternity hospitals, Children's Hospitals

Abudwak Maternity and Children's Hospital (Somali: Isbitaalka Caabudwaaq ee Daryeelka Umulaha iyo Caruurta) is a health services center in Abudwak, the largest city in Galgadud Region. This maternity hospital was initiated by the Somali diaspora.

== Staff and services ==
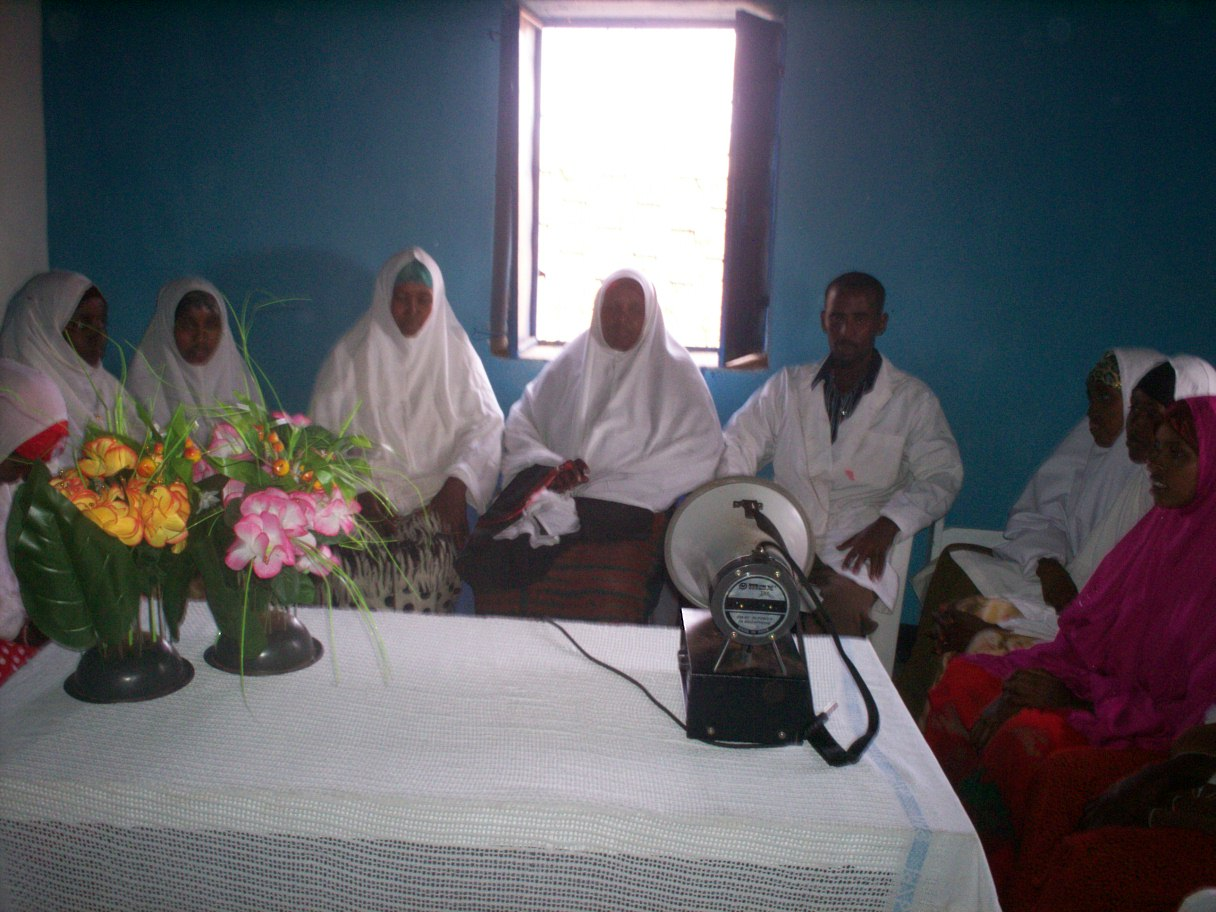
Staff

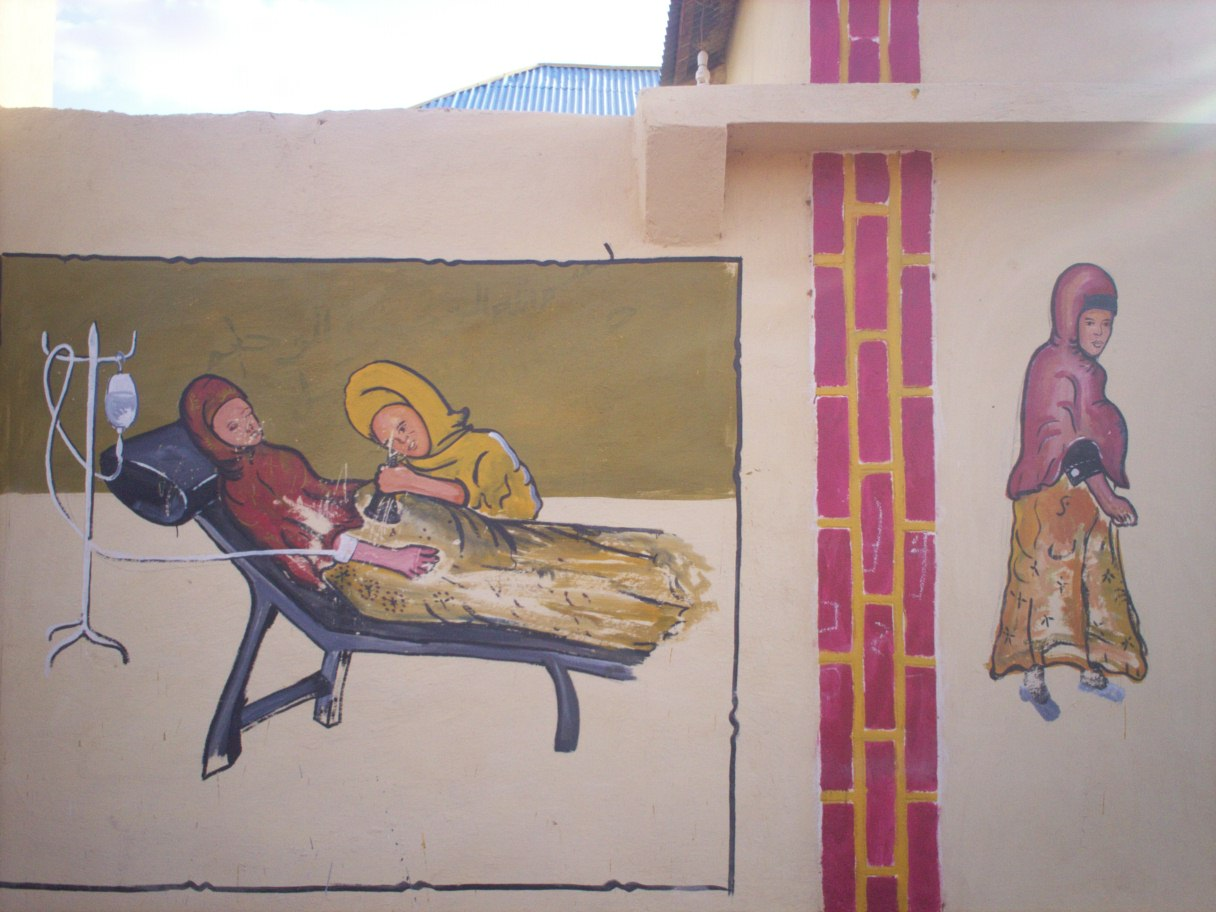
Mural depicting a pregnant woman receiving modern care

The medical staff at Abudwak Maternity and Children's Hospital consist of two midwives, two junior nurses, a pharmacist and infectious disease specialist.

Funding agencies and supporting groups such as Somalicare, Somali-American Women Aid Project and Somali Education and Health Organization hope to make Abudwak Maternity and Children's Hospital a sound health center where all the basic services are offered.

It provides the following:

1. Prenatal and Maternity Services
2. Postpartum Care
3. Children's Health Services
4. Pharmacy Services and
5. Outpatient Care Clinic

== Background ==
Abudwak District and the town of Abudwak. In many ways, Abudwak is a strategic town for its central location.

MCH is run by UN agencies where the only functioning medical facilities in Abudwak, a town with over 100,000 residents.

Residents of Abudwak with serious health condition and in many cases patients with complicated pregnancies would seek treatment in far way cities such as Galkayo, a half day's drive. This just added to the difficulties women faced for two decades.

During the late 1990s, Abudwak attracted an optometrist who was originally from Abduwak but the residents didn't take advantage of this doctor's skills. Dr. Abdiaziz Sheikh Abdi didn't receive any welcoming from Abudwak residents. He intended to open the first well-meaning medical centers in central Somalia and give his hometown, Abudwak, a well-staffed hospital. Instead he opened office in Bosaso where he thrived. Abudwak patients who want to see Dr. Abdiaziz now have to travel hundreds of kilometers.

In the past, Abudwak had negative interaction with medically trained professionals. In September 2007 a polio worker was killed. No new doctors dared to venture to open up a medical center in Abudwak area since Dr. Abdiaziz has decided to make his office elsewhere.

== History ==
Abudwak Maternity and Children's Hospital was in the making for two years until it was established on a rented 9 room building. Diaspora friends of Abudwak started a campaign to set up basic health center for the residents of Abudwak and surrounding cities and towns such as Balanbal, Bangeeleey and Dhabad. Abudwak Maternity and Children's Hospital officially took form in July 2009.
