= Gargaar Multispeciality Hospital =

Hospital in Somaliland

Gargaar Multi-speciality Hospital
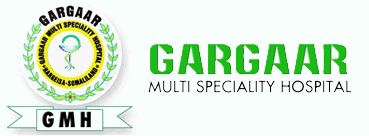

Geography
- Location: Hargeisa, Marodi-Jeeh, Somaliland

Organisation
- Type: Private

Services
- Emergency department: Yes

History
- Founded: 2009; 17 years ago

Links
- Website: gargaarhospital.net

The Gargaar Multi-speciality Hospital was founded in 2009. It is a multi-speciality private hospital, located in Hargeisa, Somaliland.

== See also ==
- Hargeisa Group Hospital
- Edna Adan Maternity Hospital
- Hargeisa Canadian Medical Center
