= TSG =

TSG may refer to:

== Organisations ==
- Sabre Holdings (former NYSE ticker symbol)
- The Sage Group, a worldwide software company
- Technology Solutions Group, former name of HP Enterprise Business, a part of Hewlett-Packard
- Technology Solutions Group LLC, a water treatment services company
- Tennessee State Guard, the state defense force of Tennessee
- Territorial Support Group, a special response unit of London's Metropolitan Police Service
- Tokushu Sakusen Gun, a Japanese special operations unit
- TheSpeedGamers, a charity group that plays speed runs of games to raise money for charity organizations
- TSG Entertainment, a film financing entity
- TSG Consumer Partners, a private equity firm formerly known as The Shansby Group
- TSG Group aka The SCO Group, a software company
- TSG 1899 Hoffenheim, a German association football club

== Science and technology ==
- Triggered spark gap, a high-voltage electronic switch
- Tumor suppressor gene, a gene that protects a cell from leading to cancer

== Legislation ==
- Transsexuals Act, a former German federal law on gender

== Other uses ==
- Tai Seng MRT station, MRT station abbreviation
- The Smoking Gun, a website
- Traditional Speciality Guaranteed, a quality scheme for traditional food specialities in the European Union and the United Kingdom.
- Traditional Sports and Games
- The Simpsons Game, a 2007 video game

== See also ==
- Texas State Guard (TXSG)
