= Zeldathon =

Video game charity marathon

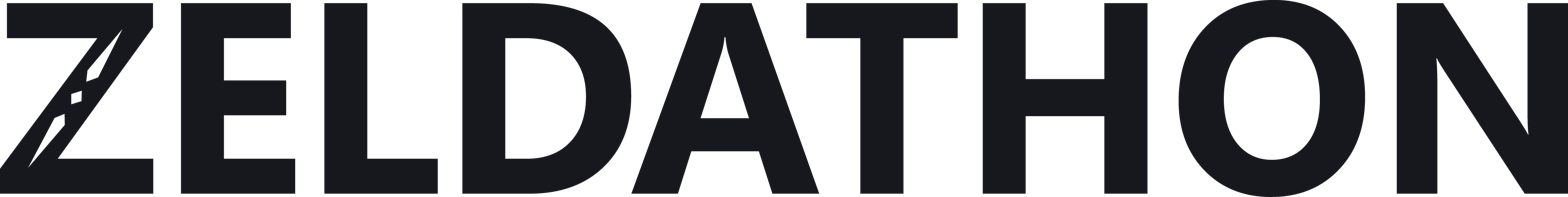
- Genre: Video game charity marathons
- Frequency: Annual
- Location: United States
- Inaugurated: December 27, 2009; 16 years ago
- Founder: Matthew "MC" Moffit
- Most recent: July 19, 2026–July 26, 2026
- Next event: December 2026
- Participants: 100+
- Organizer: Kinstone, LLC (2009-2024); Overproduced, LLC (2025-present)
- Website: zeldathon.net

Zeldathon is an annual video game charity marathon, broadcast live on Twitch. Traditionally, every major video game in The Legend of Zelda series is completed back-to-back throughout the event, over the course of several days. Viewers are encouraged to donate directly to a selected charity in order to reach various goals and motivate the attendees to perform various challenges, such as playing the game upside down, or dressing up as a recurring video game character.

As of 2026, more than 100 people from across the world had participated in the event, with the most recent instances featuring over 70 attendees each. Over the course of 30 marathons, the team has raised more than $3 million for various charitable causes.

At the conclusion of the 22nd marathon, a documentary on the event's history, Money Making Game, was announced with a projected release of December 2019 to celebrate Zeldathon's 10th anniversary. The documentary was premiered at the 25th marathon, Zeldathon Forces. On August 28, 2024, Matthew "MC" Moffit announced he was stepping down as director of Zeldathon.

== Founding ==
Zeldathon was first organized in late 2009 by Matthew "MC" Moffit and Zak Ondish, having taken inspiration from other charity gaming marathons such as TheSpeedGamers.

Following the first marathon, motivation was low to continue to create another event. However, another attendee of the initial event wanted to do a second as a high school senior project. Moffit agreed to help, and they planned and executed a second summer event. Following this, the marathon continued to return twice annually, in the summer and winter, with occasional mini-marathons being held as needed.

== Honors ==
In September 2016, the Zeldathon Team was awarded the "Help Award" by Help Hope Live, for excellence in fund-raising following their fifteenth marathon, Zeldathon Hope. The award was given as a direct result of their effort in raising more than $250,000 for Help Hope Live in the 150-hour event.

== List of marathons ==
There have been 33 mainline marathons to date.

#	Title	Start date	End date	Charity	Total raised	Duration	Notes
1	Zeldathon for Charity	December 27, 2009	December 30, 2009	Child's Play	$301	72 hours	
2	Zeldathon for the American Cancer Society	June 19, 2010	June 22, 2010	American Cancer Society	$3,322	72 hours	a.k.a. Zeldathon ACS
3	Zeldathon for the American Diabetes Association	December 27, 2010	January 1, 2011	American Diabetes Association	$4,001	120 hours	a.k.a. Zeldathon ADA
4	Zeldathon Quest	June 22, 2011	June 24, 2011	RJ's College Fund	$2,672	48 hours	Mini-marathon
5	Zeldathon for the American Red Cross	July 19, 2011	July 23, 2011	American Red Cross	$13,280	96 hours	a.k.a. Zeldathon ARC
6	Zeldathon Child's Play	December 29, 2011	January 5, 2012	Child's Play	$15,473	170 hours	
7	Ultimate Zeldathon	July 7, 2012	July 12, 2012	Child's Play	$27,176	120 hours	
8	Zeldathon Water	December 27, 2012	January 1, 2013	charity: water	$45,874	120 hours	
9	Zeldathon Lives	July 5, 2013	July 10, 2013	National Foundation for Transplants	$53,039	120 hours	
10	Zeldathon: Headstone for a Hero	October 4, 2013	October 6, 2013	Zachary's Headstone	$10,202	48 hours	Mini-marathon
11	Zeldathon St. Jude	December 27, 2013	January 1, 2014	St. Jude Children's Research Hospital	$54,965	120 hours	
12	Zeldathon Adventure	July 10, 2014	July 17, 2014	St. Jude Children's Research Hospital	$97,251	156 hours	
13	Zeldathon Relief	December 27, 2014	January 2, 2015	Direct Relief	$106,100	141 hours	
14	Zeldathon Deluxe	June 19, 2015	June 25, 2015	charity: water	$196,097	140 hours	
15	Zeldathon Hope	December 27, 2015	January 2, 2016	Help Hope Live	$251,554	147 hours	
16	Zeldathon Recovery	June 17, 2016	June 23, 2016	Direct Relief	$230,077	148 hours	
17	Zeldathon Classic	October 14, 2016	October 17, 2016	Child's Play	$27,546	72 hours	Mini-marathon
18	Zeldathon Cures	December 27, 2016	January 2, 2017	St. Jude Children's Research Hospital	$376,157	143 hours	
19	Zeldathon Wild	June 5, 2017	June 11, 2017	WILD Foundation	$169,982	147 hours	
20	Anything Other Than Zeldathon	September 29, 2017	October 2, 2017	Help Hope Live	$26,803	75 hours	Mini-marathon - did not play Zelda titles
21	Zeldathon Mission	December 27, 2017	January 2, 2018	Direct Relief	$224,665	149 hours	
22	Zeldathon Champions	June 15, 2018	June 21, 2018	St. Jude Children's Research Hospital	$160,013	144 hours	
23	Zeldathon Response	December 27, 2018	January 2, 2019	Direct Relief	$165,000	145 hours	
24	Zeldathon Heals	June 13, 2019	June 20, 2019	Help Hope Live	$170,049	164 hours	
25	Zeldathon Forces	December 27, 2019	January 3, 2020	St. Jude Children's Research Hospital	$173,700	153 hours	10-year anniversary
26	Zeldathon Ascent	December 27, 2021	January 2, 2022	St. Jude Children's Research Hospital	$176,843	147 hours	
27	Zeldathon Daybreak	August 2, 2022	August 8, 2022	Direct Relief	$125,800	145 hours	
28	Zeldathon Echoes	July 6, 2023	July 12, 2023	charity: water	$137,400	151 hours	
29	Zeldathon Dimensions	December 27, 2023	January 2, 2024	Make-A-Wish Foundation	$112,445	149 hours	
30	Zeldathon 1986	August 13, 2024	August 20, 2024	St. Jude Children's Research Hospital	$105,822	155 hours	
31	Zeldathon Voyage	June 9, 2025	June 15, 2025	charity: water	$123,500	134 hours	
32	Zeldathon Mythos	December 27, 2025	January 2, 2026	Make-A-Wish Foundation	$129,108	134 hours	
33	Super Zeldathon	July 19, 2026	July 26, 2026	St. Jude Children's Research Hospital	TBD	TBD	
34	Zeldathon Legacy	December 2026		TBD	TBD	TBD	

=== Piece of Heart ===
In addition to their primary marathons, in 2019 the Zeldathon Team announced Piece of Heart, a convention-based charity event featuring Zeldathon participants.

#	Title	Start date	End date	Venue	Charity	Total raised	Duration	Notes
1	Piece of Heart	May 24, 2019	May 26, 2019	MomoCon 2019	St. Jude Children's Research Hospital	$16,051	26 hours	Final duration excludes breaks between days.
2	Piece of Heart	May 26, 2022	May 29, 2022	MomoCon 2022	St. Jude Children's Research Hospital	$20,122	42 hours	Final duration excludes breaks between days.

=== Side Quest ===
At the end of Zeldathon Forces, the Zeldathon Team announced Zeldathon Parallel Worlds, an event focusing on non-Zelda titles. The team has said that this is its own line of events, rather than part of the main list of Zeldathon marathons. While originally planned to begin on June 4, 2020, it was announced in March 2020 that the event would be delayed due to the COVID-19 outbreak.

It was also revealed that an online-only event would be held in its place, scheduled to begin on June 5, in support of Direct Relief. The event was later given the title of Side Quest. On June 3, it was announced that Side Quest would be delayed in solidarity with the Black Lives Matter movement following the George Floyd protests, with a new starting date of August 7 announced in July.

#	Title	Start date	End date	Charity	Total raised	Duration	Notes
1	Side Quest	August 7, 2020	August 12, 2020	Direct Relief	$72,127	127 hours	Online-only event
2	Take to the Seas!	December 26, 2020	January 2, 2021	charity: water	$87,887	172 hours	Online-only event
3	A Fantastic Journey!	June 11, 2021	June 18, 2021	Direct Relief	$78,250	157 hours	Online-only event
4	Banana Slamma!	September 17, 2021	September 19, 2021	Starlight Children's Foundation	$8,045	48 hours	Online-only event
5	Dampe's Twilight Tour!	October 28, 2022	October 31, 2022	Gamers Outreach Foundation	$12,600	42 hours	Online-only event, final duration excludes breaks between days
6	Waluigi's Arcade Heist!	October 27, 2023	October 30, 2023	Starlight Children's Foundation	$8,300	43 hours	Online-only event, final duration excludes breaks between days
7	Winter Masquerade	December 29, 2024	January 2, 2025	Starlight Children's Foundation	$29,056	70 hours	Final duration excludes breaks between days.
8	Retro Rodeo	March 20, 2026	March 23, 2026	Starlight Children's Foundation	$18,617	42 hours	Online-only event, final duration excludes breaks between days.

=== Fairy Fountain ===
In 2025, the Zeldathon Team announced Fairy Fountain, a music-based charity event being done in collaboration with Ongaku Overdrive to support relief efforts for the January 2025 Southern California wildfires. One year later, it was announced that Fairy Fountain would be returning as a recurring event, with the event's second iteration featuring a broadcast of Legendary, a live concert produced by Ongaku Overdrive in celebration of the 40th anniversary of the Legend of Zelda series.

#	Title	Start date	End date	Charity	Total raised	Duration	Notes
1	Hearts for LA	February 16, 2025	February 17, 2025	LA Wildfire Relief	$8,005	10 hours	Online-only event
2	Hope For The Day	February 20, 2026	February 22, 2026	Hope For The Day	$8,150	23 hours	Final duration excludes breaks between days.
