= Amy Weaver =

American business executive

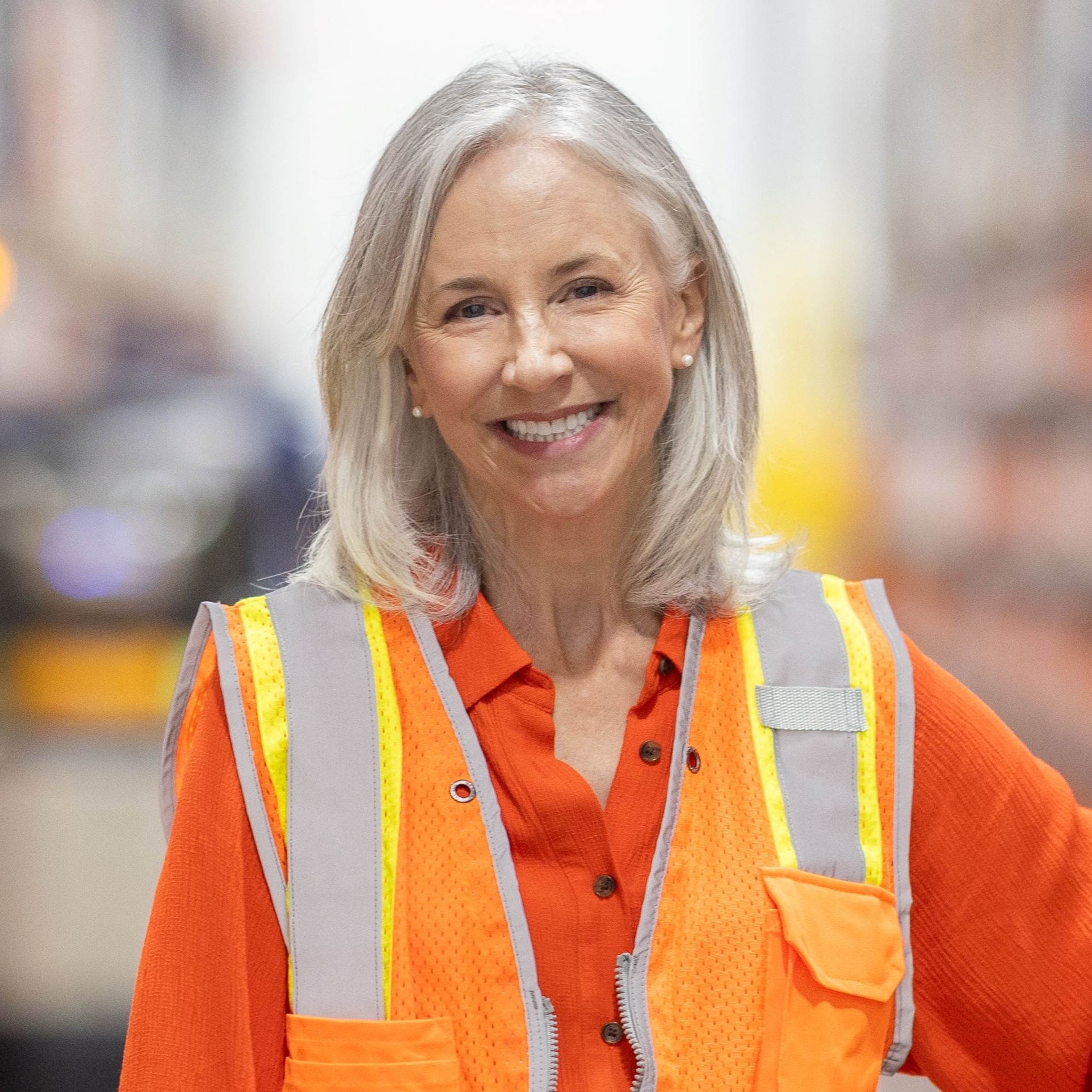
- Education: Wellesley College (BA); Harvard Law School (JD)
- Occupations: business executive; attorney
- Employer: Direct Relief
- Title: Chief Executive Officer (CEO)
- Board member of: McDonald's; Habitat for Humanity International; Software Alliance

Amy Weaver is an American business executive and attorney who is the CEO of Direct Relief, the fifth largest nonprofit in the United States. She previously held senior leadership roles at Salesforce, including president, chief financial officer, and chief legal officer, as well as roles at Univar Solutions and Expedia.

== Education ==
Weaver attended Wellesley College where she earned a Bachelor of Arts in political science and American studies. She earned a juris doctor degree from Harvard Law School.

== Career ==
=== Early legal and corporate career ===
After graduating from Harvard Law School, Weaver worked as a research associate at Harvard Business School before she clerked for the U.S. Ninth Circuit Court of Appeals. She then moved to Hong Kong and worked as a legislative aide for a member of the Hong Kong Legislative Council as part of the Luce Scholars Program. After this, Weaver worked as an attorney at the law firms Perkins Coie LLP and Cravath Swaine & Moore LLP. She was executive vice president and general counsel of Univar Solutions Inc., and senior vice president and deputy general counsel at Expedia Group Inc.

=== Salesforce ===
Weaver joined Salesforce in 2013 as senior vice president and general counsel. In 2017, she was named president, and in 2020 she accepted the additional role of chief legal officer. In February 2021, Weaver's role changed to president and chief financial officer. She held these positions until 2024 when she stepped down, but remained a special adviser to the CEO through April 2026. During Weaver's time in leadership, Salesforce moved up 50 spots in the Fortune 500 and saw significant revenue growth increasing sales from $3 billion in 2013 to $35-$38 billion in 2024. Weaver received a total compensation of $12.2 million as president and CFO of Salesforce in 2024.

=== Direct Relief ===
In March 2025, Weaver was announced as the next CEO of Direct Relief, the fifth largest nonprofit in the U.S and provider of medical aid and other disaster relief to over 100 countries. She started in the role in early May.

== Appearances & recognition ==
Weaver is a life member of the Council on Foreign Relations and she serves on the board of directors for McDonald's. She has been on the board of Habitat for Humanity International and BSA | The Software Alliance.

In 2026, Weaver was named CEO of the Year by Pacific Coast Business Times. In 2025, Weaver was named to Forbes' "50 Over 50," list recognizing women who have impacted their fields after the age of 50. In 2021, Weaver was included in a list of 11 most influential financial executives by Business Insider. In 2018, she was named to the Financial Times’ Global GC 25 List. In 2016, Weaver was named one of the most Influential Women in Business in the Bay Area by the San Francisco Business Times. Weaver has also been a speaker at World Economic Forum events and at the Reykjavik Global Forum of Women Leaders.
