= Hargeisa Group Hospital =

Geography
- Location: Hargeisa, Marodi-Jeeh, Somaliland

Organisation
- Type: General

Services
- Emergency department: Yes
- Beds: 400

History
- Founded: 1953

Links
- Lists: Hospitals in Somaliland

The Hargeisa Group Hospital was established in 1953. It is a 400-bed hospital, located in Hargeisa, is the largest public hospital in Somaliland, and offers healthcare facilities to patients of the city.

== History ==
The hospital was founded in 1953.

== Departments ==
- Maternity
- Emergency
- Dental
- Ophthalmology
- Pediatric
- Surgery
- Internal medicine
- Nephrology
- Orthopedics
- Pathology

== See also ==
- Ministry of Health (Somaliland)
- Gargaar Multispeciality Hospital
- Hargeisa Canadian Medical Center
