= Edna Adan Maternity Hospital =

Hospital in Somaliland

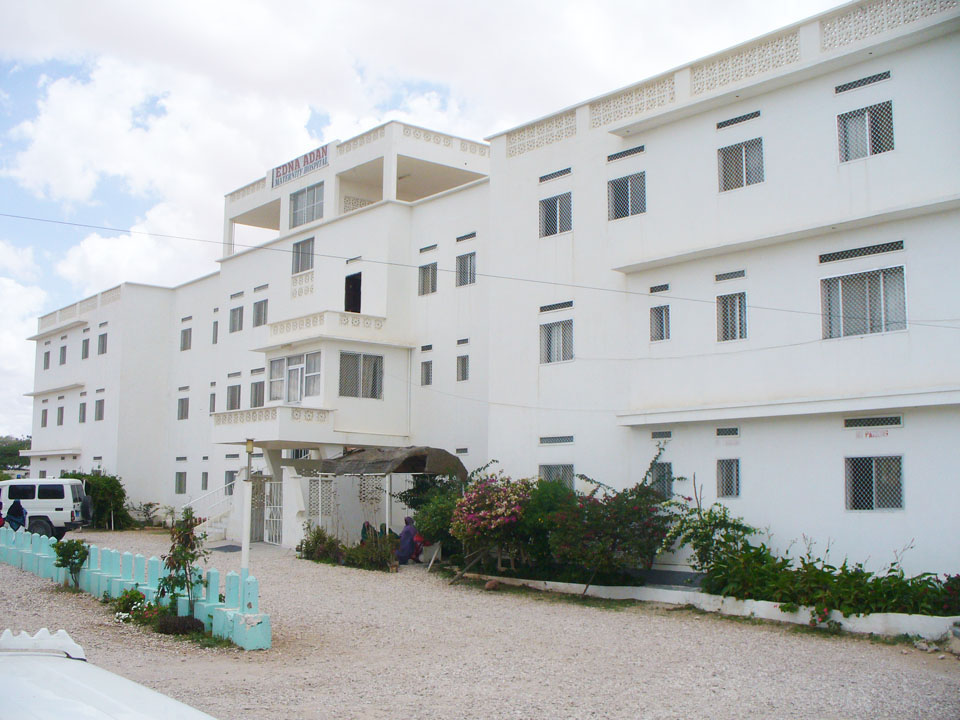

Geography
- Location: Hargeisa, Somaliland
- Coordinates: 9.550873°N 44.066354°E

Organisation
- Funding: Non-profit
- Type: Specialist
- Affiliated university: Edna Adan University
- Patron: Edna Adan Ismail

Services
- Beds: 69
- Speciality: Obstetrics (Antenatal/Postnatal), Gynecology, Teaching hospital

History
- Opened: 2002

Links
- Website: www.ednahospital.org

Edna Adan Maternity Hospital is a non-profit charity hospital built in Hargeisa, Somaliland. It was founded by the autonomous northwestern Somaliland region's former foreign minister and former first lady of Somalia, Edna Adan Ismail. The hospital provides health care to people whose lives have been traumatized by war, and trains nurses, midwives, and other health workers. In addition to services and facilities relating specifically to maternal and infant health care, the hospital has diagnostic laboratory facilities and an emergency blood bank, and offers diagnosis and treatment for sexually transmitted diseases.

It works in collaboration with the Ministry of Health, UNICEF, and WHO to train a new generation of nurses and midwives to provide Reproductive Health care throughout the Somaliland region.

Another aspect of the hospital's mission is to combat the practice of female circumcision, which is endemic to the region. Mothers of newborn girls are counseled on the dangers of having their child circumcised; the tradition is strongly ingrained in the culture.

== History ==
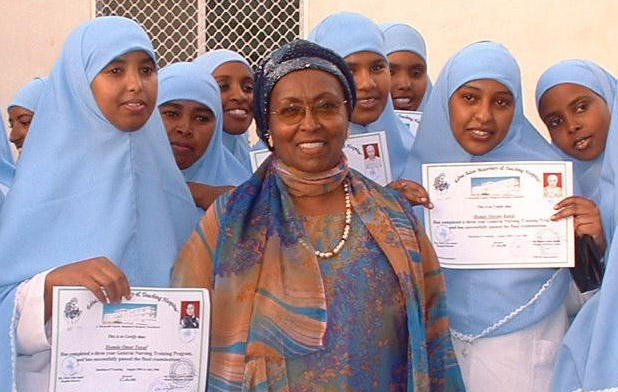
Edna Adan Ismail with a class of nursing school graduates

Following the Somali Civil War, the entire health infrastructure of Somaliland was effectively destroyed and there were few, if any, trained medical personnel remaining in the region. The rate of maternal and infant mortality was among the highest in the world. Edna Adan donated her U.N. pension and other personal assets to build the hospital so that she might help to address the grave health crisis.

Needing, first of all, a place to build her hospital, she asked the government for land near the city center. They responded by offering her 9600 square meters which previously had served as a garbage dump.

The construction of the hospital was started on January 1, 1998 and as it progressed, private individuals, business people in Somaliland and elsewhere, as well as international organizations, also made valuable contributions enabling the hospital to become functional on the March 9, 2002.

Direct Relief describes the hospital as Somaliland's premier referral center for obstetric emergencies. The hospital trains nurses and midwives under the close supervision of Mrs. Ismail, herself a trained nurse, whose residence is inside of the hospital.

The hospital is supported by two charities: The Edna Adan Foundation first became a registered charity in 2016 in the UK. The oldest charity, established in 2000, is the non-profit Friends of Edna's Maternity Hospital; it maintains an endowment fund to ensure the continuation of Edna's work long into the future.

== See also ==
- East Bardera Mothers and Children's Hospital
