= Edna Adan Ismail =

Somali politician (born 1937)

- Adna Aadan Ismaaciil
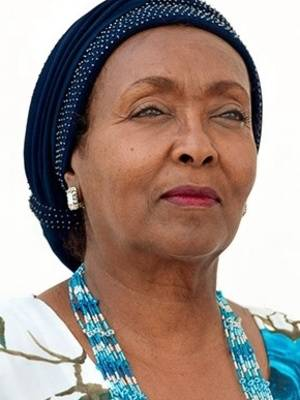

8th Minister of Foreign Affairs
- In office June 25, 2003 – June 26, 2006
- President: Dahir Riyale Kahin
- Preceded by: Mohammad Saed Gees
- Succeeded by: Abdilahi Mohamed Dualeh

Personal details
- Born: 8 September 1937 (age 88) Hargeisa, British Somaliland (now Somaliland)
- Education: Borough Polytechnic (now London South Bank University)
- Occupation: Activist
- Known for: Activist for the abolition of female genital mutilation (FGM)
- Awards: Templeton Prize (2023)

Edna Adan Ismail (Somali: Edna Aadan Ismaaciil / Adna Aadan Ismaaciil; born 8 September 1937) is a nurse midwife, activist, and was the first female Foreign Minister of Somaliland from 2003 to 2006.

She is the director and founder of the Edna Adan Maternity Hospital in Hargeisa and an activist and pioneer in the struggle for the abolition of female genital mutilation. She is also President of the Organization for Victims of Torture. In March 2022, she became the president of the Unrepresented Nations and Peoples Organization.

She was married three times, including to Mohamed Haji Ibrahim Egal, who was the prime minister of the State of Somaliland

== Early life ==
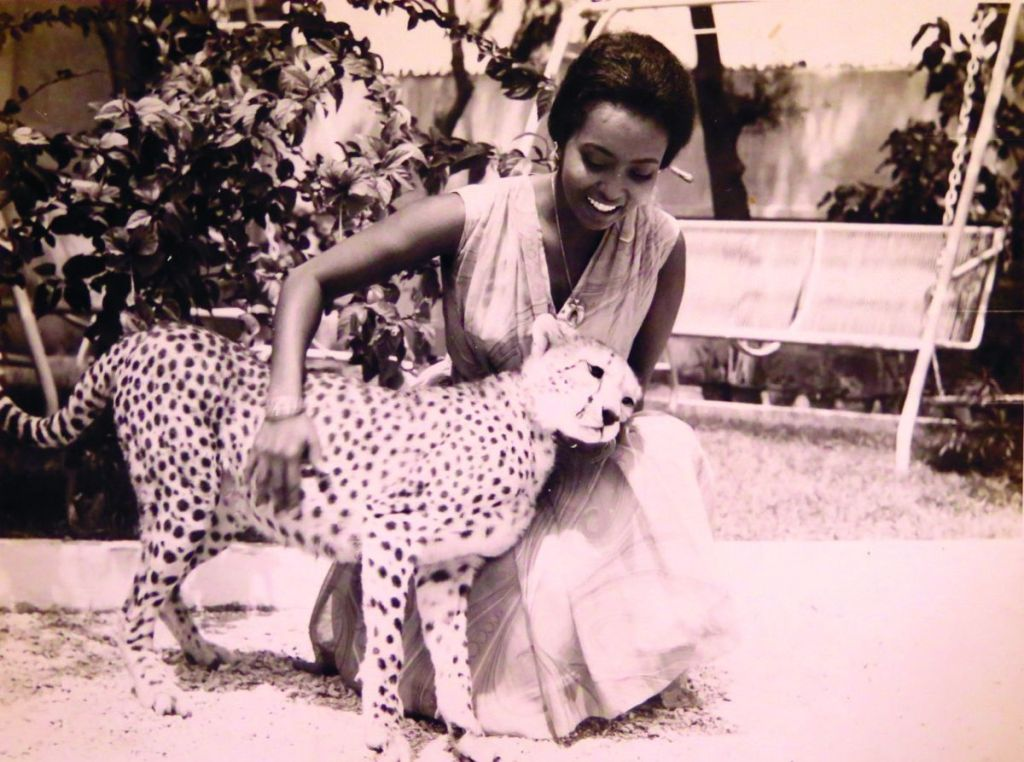
Ismail with her pet cheetah in 1968.

Ismail was born in Hargeisa, in what was at the time British Somaliland, on 8 September 1937, the daughter of a prominent Somali medical doctor. She was one of five children born to her mother, but two died at the time of delivery. At the time girls weren't educated in Somaliland, but her father hired a tutor for some local boys and she learned to read and write with them. She later went to a school in Djibouti where her aunt was a teacher. When she was eight years old, she underwent FGM. It was arranged by her mother and grandmother when her father was on a business trip; when he returned he was furious.

Wanting to prevent other women from undergoing the same trauma she did, she trained as a nurse and midwife in the United Kingdom at the Borough Polytechnic, now London South Bank University. She later married Muhammad Haji Ibrahim Egal.

She is said to be "the first Somali girl" to study in Britain, Somaliland first qualified nurse-midwife and the first Somali woman to drive.

== Hospital work ==
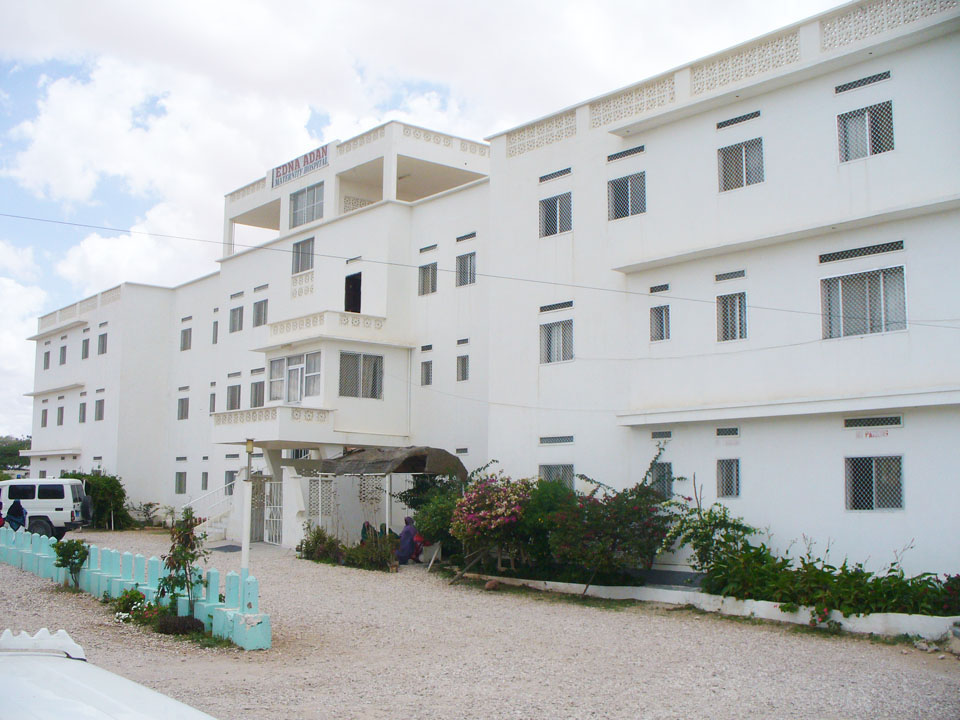
Edna Adan Maternity Hospital, Hargeisa

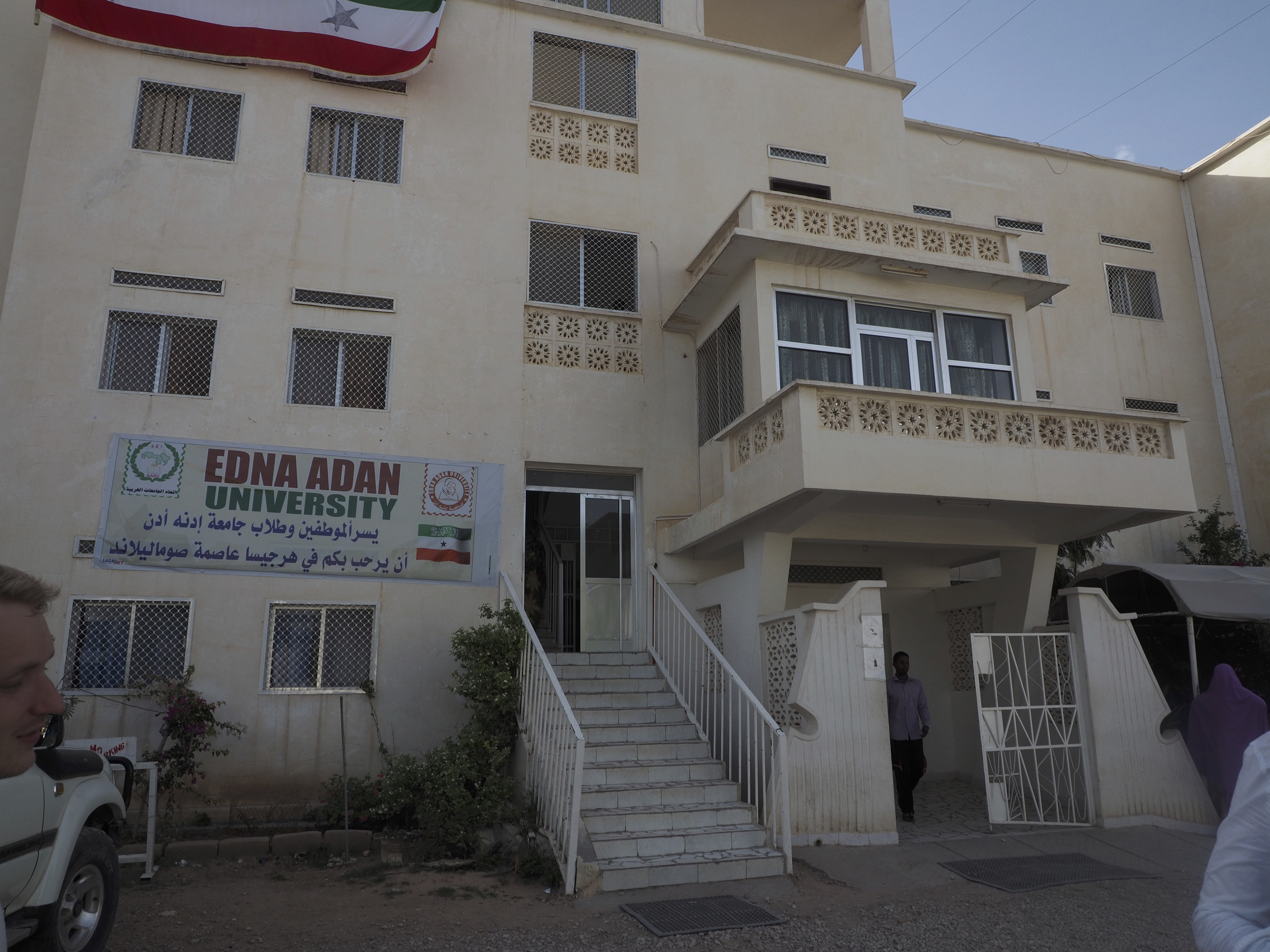
Edna Adan University, Hargeisa

In 1980, Ismail began building a hospital in Somaliland's capital of Hargeisa, but was forced to leave the country due to the beginning of the Somaliland War of Independence in 1981.

She returned to Somaliland and built a maternity hospital, which, as of 2012, she continued to run. The Edna Adan Maternity Hospital opened on 9 March 2002, on a former rubbish dump donated to her by the regional government. The region lacked trained nurses to staff the hospital – as most had either fled the country or been killed during the civil war – and so Edna recruited more than 30 trainee nurses in 2000, while the hospital was still being built. The hospital now has two operating theatres, laboratory, library, computer centre and a complete wing dedicated to training nurses and midwives. As of 2018, the hospital had 200 staff and 1500 students.

The mission of the Edna Adan Hospital is to help to improve the health of the local inhabitants, in particular the high rate of maternal and infant mortality. The facility is a non-profit making charity and a midwifery teaching hospital that also undertakes training of student nurses and assistant laboratory technicians.

== Charity work ==
Ismail's work is supported by charities in the United Kingdom and the United States which help her raise support and awareness to train additional midwives and fight FGM in Somaliland.

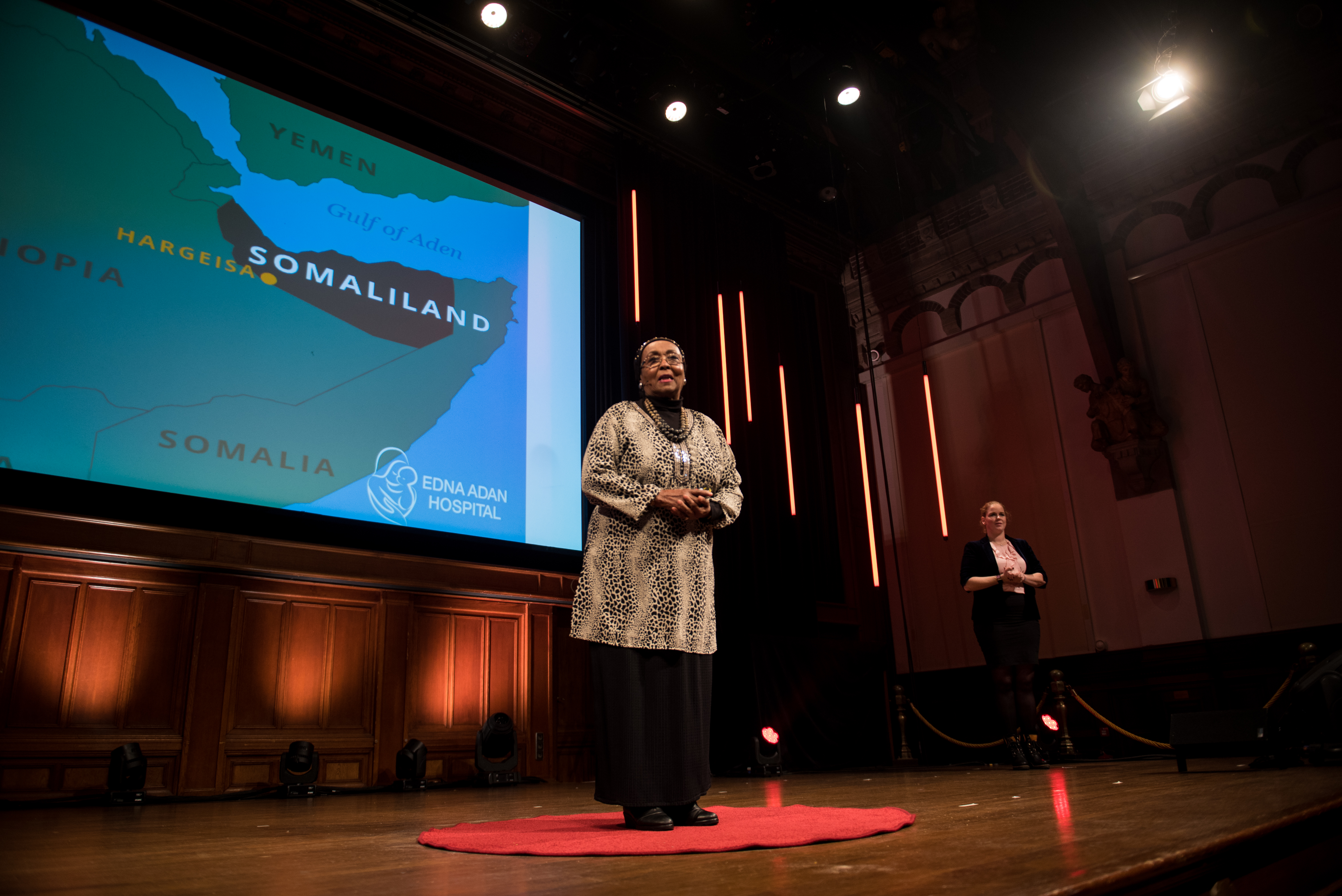
Edna Adan Presenting at TEDxAmsterdam 2019

== Government work ==
Ismail was the only female minister in the Somaliland government until July 2006, when she was replaced as Foreign Minister by former Minister of Information and National Guidance Abdillahi Mohamed Dualeh. In addition to her work in government, she continues to be a voice for the Somaliland peoples' democratic will. In March 2022, she was elected as President of the Unrepresented Nations and Peoples Organization.

== Awards and recognition ==
Ismail was a recipient of the AMANITARE 2002 Annual Award for her efforts to open a private maternity hospital in Somaliland in 1998.

In recognition of her lifelong contribution to humanitarian work, the name of Edna Adan Ismail was added to the Medical Mission Hall of Fame, University of Toledo, Ohio, in March 2007. She has an Honorary Doctoral Degree from Clark University in Massachusetts. She was made an Honorary Fellow of Cardiff University in Wales in 2008. In 2018, she was granted an Honorary Fellowship by the Royal College of Obstetricians and Gynaecologists.

In 2012, Ismail was featured in the documentary Half the Sky: Turning Oppression into Opportunity for Women Worldwide, premiering on PBS 1 and 2 October. The series introduces women and girls living under very difficult circumstances and bravely fighting to challenge them. The Half the Sky PBS TV series is produced by Show of Force along with Fugitive Films. She was the castaway in the long-running series Desert Island Discs on BBC Radio 4 on 22 October 2017.

She has been called "The Muslim Mother Teresa" by Kate Grant, CEO of the Fistula Foundation.

In 2018, she was awarded an honorary doctorate from London South Bank University.

In 2019, she wrote a book about her life, "A Woman of Firsts".

In 2023, she was awarded the Templeton Prize.

== See also ==
- Edna Adan Maternity Hospital
- Edna Adan University
