= Edna Adan University =

University in Hargeisa, Somaliland

- Jaamacadda Edna Aadan
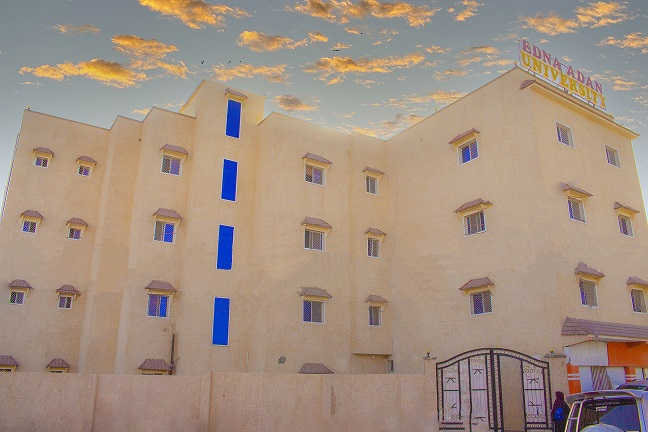
- Other names: جامعة إدنا آدم
- Former names: Edna Adan University Hospital, Edna Adan Maternity Hospital
- Motto: Success and Development
- Type: Private
- Established: September 15, 2010; 15 years ago
- President: Edna Adan Ismail
- Students: 1512
- Location: Hargeisa, Maroodi Jeex, Republic of Somaliland
- Campus: Urban
- Colors: White and Red
- Website: Official Website

The Edna Adan University (Somali: Jaamacadda Edna Aadan, Arabic: جامعة إدنا آدم, abbreviated EAU) is a private university located in Hargeisa, the capital of Somaliland. The current president of the university is Edna Adan Ismail.

== History ==
The institution was founded in 2010 by Edna Adan Ismail and still remains as its chancellor. She is also founded Edna Adan Maternity Hospital and Edna Adan Foundation.

== Administration ==
The University Board of Trustees

The University Chancellor

The University President and CEO

- The University Legal Advisor

The University Vice President - Administration, Finance and Development

- The University Public and International Relations Office
- The University Quality Assurance and Control Office
- The University Director of Finance, HR and Administration
  - The University Accountant
  - The Procurement and Logistics Office
    - The Store Keeper
  - The ICT Office
    - E-Library
    - Library
  - The University Administration and Finance Office
    - Finance Assistants
    - Front Desk-Receptionists
    - Archives
    - Support Staff

The University Vice President - Academic Affairs

- Post Graduate Programs
- Office of the Registrar
- Research Office
- Community Service
- Academic Director
  - The Faculty Deans and Heads of Departments
  - The University Academic Committee

== Campus and Location ==
The main Edna Adan University campus and Edna Adan University Hospital] are all located along 1, Iftin Road Hargeisa, Maroodi Jeex, Somaliland, Horn of Africa.

The Edna Adan Hospital Foundation is located along 1660 L Street NW Suite 501, Washington, DC 20036, USA.

== Faculties and Programs ==
- Nursing
- Midwifery
- Public Health
- Pharmacy
- Medical Laboratory Sciences
- Computing and IT
- Business and Accounting

== King's Somaliland Partnership on Medicine and Health Sciences ==
The Edna Adan University also collaborates with King's College London, through King's Somaliland Partnerships to run Medical Programs. This is one of the largest and long-running global health partnerships. The program is also supported online by MedicineAfrica.

== See also ==
- Edna Adan Maternity Hospital
- Edna Adan Ismail
- Hargeisa Group Hospital
