= Somali Education and Health Organization =

NGO operating in Southern Somalia

SEHO (Somali Education and Health Organization) is a non-profit non-governmental organization operating in southern Somalia. It also has offices in the United States and Canada.

== History ==
SEHO was founded in 2002. At the time, it operated a computer and language school in Columbus, Ohio, United States. The school was utilized by Somali immigrants in Ohio as well as high school and college students who had difficulties adjusting to the new school systems.

Founders of the school decided to transfer some of the teaching materials, techniques and curriculum to schools in Somalia. The idea took hold soon after. The devastating drought of 2005 which hit Somalia and Kenya made efforts of SEHO volunteers even more meaningful.

== Background ==
From early 2006, it was apparent that health and education collaboration services were needed in Bardera. The creation of a center or an institution, which develops mechanisms to deal with human health (including sanitation services), animal health (veterinary services), and agricultural services were then initiated by SEHO staff and volunteers. With this background, emerged SEHO support services and its community development goals.

SEHO's first office in Somalia was opened in 2006 in Bardera, Gedo. The first activity of SEHO was the creation of a maternity center in Bardera. This community with an estimated population of over 100,000 didn't have specialized center for women and children. The district hospital has been closed for more than 14 years.

Few volunteers including Abdirahman Dini Saylici, Dr. Adan Loyan, Dahir Abdullahi Abdi and Dr. Mohammed Jama Hashi who lived in Ohio at the time, collected reference material, basic medical equipment and hospital supplies. The shipment was sent July 2007 to Bardera Maternity Hospital or East Bardera Mothers and Children's Hospital, EBMCH for short.

== Current SEHO non-profit operations in Southern and Central Somalia ==
=== Bardera ===
SEHO currently supports two well-utilized institutions; one in the health sector and other is in the education sector. The two centers are:

1. East Bardera Mothers and Children's Hospital and with its new addition, the Westside Maternity Unit or West Bardera Maternity Unit, and
2. Bardera Polytechnic

The school covers third sector, which is the agricultural services by having agricultural science department. Since mid-2008, the maternity hospital and the school were collaborating on many issues facing the Bardera community.

For each year, during 2007 and 2008, EBMCH served over 3,000 people , mostly women and children. Services include prenatal to postpartum and children's basic health services.

=== Abudwak Maternity Hospital ===
SEHO is working with diaspora friends of Abudwak to set up the first maternity hospital in this region, an extended MCH.

As of March 2009, there are two MCHs in Abudwak city which has an estimated population of 100,000 inhabitants. The Abudwak Maternity Center being established with the help of SEHO and Somali-American Women Aid Project, will be an extended MCH, meaning a health center with full hospital operations with such departments as pharmacy and emergency departments.

=== Hagar and Nasariah Maternity and Children's Health Centers ===
Hagar and Nasariah are both located in Lower Jubba. These centers are in the building stages as of mid-2009.

During 2009-2010 school-year, Hagar will send some of its nurses and midwives to Bardera Polytechnic College to receive more training and fees are paid by SEHO.

=== Somali diaspora support for SEHO ===
All operations carried out by SEHO since 2006 have been made possible by Somalia diaspora communities in Kenya, Canada, and USA. SEHO organizes fund-raising and awareness efforts.

Since there are no functioning government institutions, caring individuals and professionals give SEHO material and financial support for the services it provides to the community.
