= West Bardera Maternity Unit =

Geography
- Location: Bardera (Gedo), Somalia
- Coordinates: 2.337433°N 42.286430°E (approximate)

History
- Opened: December 13, 2008

Links
- Lists: Hospitals in Somalia

West Bardera Maternity Unit, is a hospital in Bardera, Somalia. Established on December 13, 2008, offers basic women's and children's health services including prenatal, child delivery services, post-partum and child immunization. Bardera has an estimated population of 106,000 and the main Bardera District Hospital is out of service.

The main Bardera hospital was last used during the early 1990s when UN and US forces were stationed here for the humanitarian mission which lasted from 1993 to 1996.

Previously, all health care centers were concentrated on the east side of town. There is sizable population on the west side of Bardera. Residents of the nearby town of Sarinley and the village of Muuri will also utilize the new West Bardera Maternity Unit.

== History ==
Residents of Bardera are able to go to one of the medical centers which offer maternity services. West Bardera Maternity Unit (WBMU) is an offshoot of East Bardera Mothers' and Children's Hospital (EBMCH) which started in early 2006. This new center was opened in December 2008.

Bardera has always maintained half dozen functioning MCH and OPD centers but their capacity to serve the community was limited. East Bardera Mothers and Children's Hospital was the first center to combine the skills of two nurses and a midwife and her assistant, along with a junior pharmacist, all females.

== Services ==
Staff at WBMU give women basic health services, often for free. The two centers, WBMU and EBMCH have one of the best-organized basic women's and children's health services in Somalia.

West Bardera Maternity Unit Staff

The figures for 2007 show that over 6,000 people utilized health services at EBMCH. Other services available at WBMU include children's vaccines and the dispensing of over-the-counter medicines.

== Staff ==
West Bardera Maternity Unit has two experienced and well-trained midwives and their assistants, along with two nurses and a junior pharmacist, all females. For the absence of government health services, thousands of people from the general public have been coming to East Bardera MCH for medical attention.

Four people work at the new West Bardera Maternity Unit, and eight people work at the East Bardera Mothers and Children's Hospital. The two centers share supplies, pharmacy and training.

Four days' training conducted by Fardowsa Abdinur Hashi

== Support ==
As part of East Bardera Mothers and Children's Hospital, West Bardera Maternity Unit is using a donated or rent free space.

WMTU center needs maintenance and some more beds for the expected demand for extra beds, toilets and other resting spaces for women. Staff get training seminars from nearby Bardera Polytechnic College. The college provides this training at no cost to the hospital system.

== Funding and supply limitations ==
As space and funding are causing some limitations, both centers share one pharmacy which is part of the East Bardera Mothers and Children's Hospital. Children, girls, women and expecting mothers get medical advice and basic medicines from the nurses and pharmacist at EBMCH, where the west maternity unit is currently only offering prenatal to maternity services. Supplements and medical records are available at both locations.
