= Direct Relief =

American charitable organization

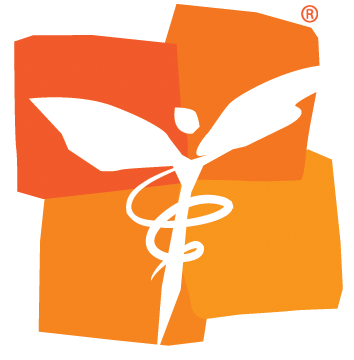
- Founded: Santa Barbara, California, US; August 23, 1948
- Founder: William D. Zimdin, Dezso Karczag
- Type: Charitable organization
- Tax ID no.: 95-1831116
- Legal status: 501(c)(3) organization
- Purpose: Emergency management, disaster response,
- Location: Santa Barbara, California
- Coordinates: 34°26′14″N 119°50′36″W
- Region served: International
- Key people: Amy Weaver (CEO), Byron Scott (president & COO)
- Revenue: $2.3B
- Employees: 100 full-time
- Volunteers: 20,000+ individuals, companies, and foundations
- Website: directrelief.org
- Formerly called: Direct Relief International

Direct Relief (formerly known as Direct Relief International) is a nonprofit organization whose stated mission is to improve the lives of people in poverty or emergency situations by providing medical resources. The charity provides emergency medical assistance and disaster relief in the United States and internationally.

Direct Relief does not accept government funding but instead relies on private, charitable contributions and donated medicine and supplies. No donated funds go towards Direct Relief's fundraising efforts. Instead, all funds go to the nonprofit's programs and emergency responses. The organization is headed by an independent board of directors.

== History ==
In 1945, William Zimdin, an Estonian immigrant to the United States and businessman, began sending thousands of relief parcels to relatives, friends, and former employees in Europe to help with the aftermath of World War II. In 1948, Zimdin formalized his efforts with the establishment of the William Zimdin Foundation. Dezso Karczag, a Hungarian Jewish immigrant, assumed management of the foundation following Zimdin's death in 1951. Karczag changed the organization's name to Direct Relief Foundation in 1957.

In the early 1960s, the foundation refined its mission to serve disadvantaged populations in medically underserved communities around the world. To assist with this effort, Direct Relief became licensed as a wholesale pharmacy in 1962 to be able to provide prescription medicines. During this time, the organization also supported victims of natural disasters in the US and homeless populations in Santa Barbara, California. The foundation assumed the name Direct Relief International in 1982.

In 2004, the Direct Relief provided almost $122 million in medical aid to 54 countries. The same year, the organization assisted Sri Ramakrishna Math and GlaxoSmithKline with designing and implementing a one-year nurse assistant training program in India. The program was launched to empower young women in districts affected by the Indian Ocean tsunami. By 2019, over 1,200 nurses had graduated.

In 2011, Direct Relief Women, a volunteer branch of the nonprofit, was created, and held its first fundraiser for Direct Relief International. All money raised went toward providing safe births around the world. In 2013, Direct Relief International assumed the name Direct Relief.

After raising $3,300 for the American Cancer Society through a partnership with Direct Relief in 2016, Matthew Moffit and Direct Relief produced Zeldathon (playing Legend of Zelda for 36 hours straight) and formed Direct Relief Gaming, which has raised $14.1M since its inception and partnered with organizations such as Humble Bundle and Bungie.

In 2018, Direct Relief provided about $1.2 billion worth of wholesale materials to health centers in over 100 countries. The organization also donated approximately $23.5 million to support the operations of health groups, including hiring more staff and converting buildings to solar energy and battery backup microgrids to better withstand disasters. 2018 was also the year that Direct Relief opened a division in Puerto Rico.

In 2022, Ukraine was the largest recipient country of Direct Relief's assistance. Overall that year, the nonprofit provided more than $2 billion in medical aid and $58.2 million in financial assistance to providers and organizations in 98 countries and 52 U.S. states and territories.

On November 21, 2023, Direct Relief announced it had donated and delivered more than $2 billion in medicine and other medical supplies since 2008 to the U.S. healthcare system. More than half went to community health centers that provide care in medically underserved communities.

In July 2024, Direct Relief's president and CEO, Thomas Tighe, announced his retirement. Under his leadership, the nonprofit provided more than $16 billion in aid and more than $350 million in grants to health organizations.

Direct Relief, ranked fifth on Forbes' 2024 list of America's Top 100 Charities, was named one of the leading organizations in disaster response, providing medical supplies and cash donations worldwide. As of June 30, 2024, it had received $2.4 billion in medical supplies and cash donations. They issued $775 million of that to aid victims of the 2023 Hawaii wildfires; the 2023 Turkey–Syria earthquakes; the wars in Gaza, Ukraine, and Sudan; hurricanes, and floods in the U.S. and abroad. The rest went to providing non-disaster medical supply aid to ongoing projects in 50 countries on five continents.

In March 2025, Direct Relief hired former Salesforce CFO Amy Weaver as their new CEO. She was listed among Forbes' "50 Over 50" list, a recognition highlighting her leadership and contributions within the nonprofit and philanthropic sectors.

== Operations ==
Between 2000 and 2014, Direct Relief's operating budget averaged roughly $11 million per year. Over the same period, it reported delivering more than $1.6 billion in medical resources and supplies worldwide. Medical supplies come largely through in-kind donations by hundreds of pharmaceutical manufacturers.

The organization manages logistics and distribution through enterprise systems that include SAP, Esri, and in-kind transportation support from FedEx.

In 2019, Direct Relief opened a new Santa Barbara warehouse and distribution headquarters. The new building is 155,000 square feet, earthquake-safe, and outfitted with state-of-the-art distribution technology for medical supplies. Direct Relief partnered with Tesla to create a microgrid power supply for the building. Solar panels are integrated with battery storage and generators to keep the headquarters running for up to six months in the face of a disaster and to store temperature-sensitive medications like insulin and vaccines.

Direct Relief partners with over 1,000 Federally Qualified Health Centers in medically underserved American communities. These partnerships last an average of nine years.

=== Corporate support ===
Corporate support for Direct Relief has included the following donations:

- Abbott Laboratories and its foundation, the Abbott Fund, provided $900,000 in grants to Direct Relief and other organizations to support relief efforts for Hurricane Harvey in 2017.
- AbbVie divided $1 million in grant funding between organizations that included Direct Relief International in order to support Hurricane Harvey relief efforts.
- Amazon partnered with Direct Relief to provide shipments of personal protective gear to thousands during the COVID-19 pandemic.
- Amgen donated $80,000 to Direct Relief International to help support those impacted by Hurricane Harvey.
- Bayer donated $100,000 to Direct Relief to support its Hurricane Harvey relief efforts.
- The Boehringer Ingelheim Cares Foundation donated $100,000 to AmeriCares and Direct Relief International for Hurricane Harvey aid.
- Bristol-Myers Squibb and its foundation donated $250,000 and medicines valued at $10 million to Direct Relief International and other organizations after Hurricane Harvey.
- Budweiser donated to Direct Relief to support the nonprofit's efforts with vaccine access.
- Chipotle offered a limited-edition virtual gift card program to support healthcare workers during the COVID-19 pandemic. 10% of the proceeds were donated to Direct Relief.
- The Clorox Company Foundation donated $5 million to Direct Relief and two other organizations to help support caregivers during the COVID-19 pandemic.
- Dove worked with Direct Relief to provide personal care products to hospitals and health care centers in 2020. The company also, in partnership with Vaseline, donated $2 million to Direct Relief to help provide personal protective equipment, ventilators, and medicine to healthcare workers.
- Eli Lilly and Company has supported Direct Relief's Fund for Health Equity.
- FedEx works with Direct Relief to deliver medical aid and supplies to those in need.
- The Gilead Foundation donated funds to organizations including Direct Relief for on-the-ground relief efforts in Turkey and Syria following a 7.8 magnitude earthquake in 2023.
- McKesson Corporation donated $100,000 to Direct Relief following Hurricane Harvey.
- Rhone donated 10% of its 2020 profits to Direct Relief.
- Rothy's committed $20,000 to Direct Relief in 2020 to help provide masks, gloves, and gowns to hospitals.
- The Starbucks Foundation donated $250,000 to Direct Relief in 2020 to support the delivery of personal protective equipment and medical items.
- The United Health Foundation donated $500,000 to Direct Relief to help provide emergency medical supplies to the Ukrainian Ministry of Health in 2022.

==== Video game industry ====
The video game industry has supported Direct Relief's humanitarian efforts. Here is a list of some contributions:

- Bungie has raised money multiple times for Direct Relief, including to support aid operations after the 2015 Nepal earthquake and during the COVID-19 pandemic.
- Pilots who competed in the Drone Racing League's 2020 FanDuel DRL SIM Racing Cup donated winnings from the event to Direct Relief.
- Epic Games announced that the Fortnite community raised $144 million in March and April 2022 for its Ukrainian donation initiative. The money was given to different nonprofits, including Direct Relief.
- In 2020, Gearbox Software launched an initiative for Borderlands 3 players, allowing them to donate $5 to Direct Relief in exchange for an in-game cosmetic.
- Games Done Quick holds speedrunning competitions to raise money for different charities, including Direct Relief.
- Humble Bundle raised over £7.5 million in 2022 and divided the funds between four different charities, one of which was Direct Relief. The proceeds supported healthcare workers during the COVID-19 pandemic.
- PUBG Mobile partnered with Direct Relief in 2020 for its Play As One campaign and donated over $1 million to COVID-19 response efforts.
- SciPlay raised $100,000 for Direct Relief to support the nonprofit's medical aid efforts in Ukraine.
- Twitch: The online gaming community, on streaming platforms such as Twitch, donated $1 million to Direct Relief during the fiscal year that ended on June 30, 2024.

== Emergency preparedness and response ==
=== Relief efforts ===
==== Hurricanes ====
Brief description of Direct Relief's efforts in preparation of Hurricane Dorian in 2019

- Hurricane Katrina (2005): Direct Relief provided care to more than 37,170 evacuees and started their Hurricane Preparedness program after Hurricane Katrina occurred.
- Hurricane Ike (2008): Hurricane Ike displaced over 100,000 people in 2008. Direct Relief provided over $1.1 million in hurricane emergency aid as of September 20, 2008. The shipments contained medicines and hygienic supplies.
- Hurricane Gustav (2008): Direct Relief committed $250,000 in hurricane response funds to assist nonprofit clinics, community health centers, and alternate care sites, working with the National Association of Community Health Centers and State Primary Care Associations in the Gulf.
- Hurricane Irene (2011): Direct Relief worked closely with Merck to make tetanus vaccines available to clinics and community health centers affected by Hurricane Irene. The organization also collaborated with the National Association of Community Health Centers, the North Carolina Community Health Center Association, the Bi-State Primary Care Association, and the Vermont Coalition of Clinics for the Uninsured to offer assistance to people affected by Irene.
- Hurricane Sandy (2012): Direct Relief provided medical supplies to community clinics, nonprofit health centers, and other groups in areas affected by Hurricane Sandy, as well as mapping pharmacies, gas stations, and other facilities that remained in the New York City area despite power outages.
- Hurricane Matthew (2016): Direct Relief sent 16.7 tons of medicine and medical supplies via a donated FedEx plane to distribute in hospitals throughout the US.
- Hurricane Harvey (2017): Direct Relief provided funding and emergency supplies to Texas community health centers.
- Hurricane Irma (2017): Direct Relief coordinated with more than seventy healthcare partners in Florida and Puerto Rico, including the Florida Association of Community Health Centers and the Asociación de Salud Primaria de Puerto Rico, to support existing nonprofit community clinics and health centers.
- Hurricane Maria (2017): Between 2017 and 2018, Direct Relief provided $70.2M in medical aid for hurricane relief.
- Hurricane Florence (2018): Direct Relief committed an initial $200K in cash and made its medical inventory available for emergencies occurring on the US East Coast.
- Hurricane Dorian (2019): Direct Relief delivered medical aid and emergency supplies to affected areas in the Bahamas.
- Hurricane Laura (2020): Direct Relief worked with more than 80 partner health facilities in Texas, Louisiana, Mississippi, Alabama, and Florida, and coordinated care efforts with primary care associations and free clinics ahead of Hurricane Laura.
- Hurricane Delta (2020): Direct Relief provided medical aid for communities affected by the storm.
- Hurricane Ida (2021): Direct Relief helped to replace supplies that were ruined due to floodwaters in clinics and pharmacies. The nonprofit sent shipments of prescription medications, emergency medical backpacks, and power options to clinics in Louisiana, Mississippi, and New York.
- Hurricane Fiona (2022): Direct Relief was the largest non-governmental organization to donat medical supplies to healthcare providers in Puerto Rico at the time of the hurricane.
- Hurricane Ian (2022): Direct Relief committed an initial $1 million in funding for relief efforts. The nonprofit provided multiple shipments of medical aid to health facilities across Florida, South Carolina, Georgia, and the Gulf Coast region.
- Hurricane Otis (2023): Direct Relief provided $200,000 in financial support to different organizations offering emergency services. This included Medical Impact, a Mexico-based nonprofit.
- Hurricane Helene (2024): After flooding from the hurricane disrupted nests of stinging insects, many people allergic to stings required medication to protect themselves. Direct Relief provided more than 2,000 EpiPen injections to community health centers, clinics, and pharmacies across western North Carolina.
- Hurricane Milton (2024): Direct Relief was one of the organizations providing support after Hurricane Milton hit. This included sending resources to hospitals, providing medical supplies to clinics, and helping to pay healthcare workers' salaries.
- Hurricane Melissa (2025): In October, Direct Relief committed an initial $250,000 of emergency funding to relief efforts and sent 100 field medic packs and 250 hygiene kits to Jamaica's Ministry of Health and Wellness. The organization also made its entire inventory of medicines and medical supplies available to healthcare providers in the Caribbean to support those impacted in Jamaica and other countries. To support recovery efforts, Direct Relief received a $1 million donation from the partnership of Carnival Corporation, the Miami Heat, and the Micky & Madeleine Arison Family Foundation. In November, Direct Relief teams remained on the ground in Jamaica to deliver medical aid and supplies to the region. The organization also chartered an aircraft to carry a shipment of 60 pallets of medical supplies and medicines worth over $1 million to Jamaica. The requested shipment was received and distributed by Jamaica's Ministry of Health and Wellness to local healthcare providers and hospitals.

==== Earthquakes ====
- Pakistan earthquake (2005): Direct Relief provided over $14 million in assistance to local partners to help rebuild healthcare infrastructure.
- Peru earthquake (2007): Direct Relief worked with FedEx and donated 32 cartons of aid worth about $100K to earthquake victims in Peru.
- Haiti earthquake (2010): Direct Relief provided $57 million in emergency medical assistance.
- Nepal earthquake (2015): Direct Relief delivered over 6.2 million doses of daily medication to earthquake survivors.
- Mexico earthquake (2017): Following the 7.1 magnitude earthquake, Direct Relief provided emergency supplies to a trauma hospital in Mexico City.
- Indonesia earthquake (2019): Direct Relief made its inventory of $30 million in medicines and supplies readily available to earthquake survivors.
- Japan earthquake & tsunami (2011): The magnitude 9 Tōhoku earthquake led to over 16,000 deaths. After the disaster, Direct Relief and the Japanese American Citizens League established the Japan Relief and Recovery Fund.
- Puerto Rico earthquake (2020): In January 2020, Puerto Rico experienced a 6.4 magnitude earthquake, its most powerful in more than a century. Direct Relief sent supplies, including essential medications, power options, and backup battery options.
- Haiti earthquake (2021): Direct Relief provided support
- Turkey–Syria earthquake (2023): After a 7.8 magnitude earthquake, Direct Relief donated $200,000 to the Syrian American Medical Society (SAMS) and AKUT. SAMS operates health facilities in northwest Syria, and AKUT is a Turkish non-governmental disaster search and relief organization.

==== Volcanoes ====
- Guatemala – Volcán de Fuego (2018): Direct Relief coordinated with the Pan American Health Organization, local partners, and pharmaceutical companies to provide aid to those displaced and injured by the volcanic blasts. Medical staff had immediate access to medical inventory for emergency response.
- Hawaii – Kīlauea volcano (2018): Direct Relief aided in mitigation efforts by providing respirator masks to those affected by the eruption.

==== Disease outbreaks ====
- H1N1 outbreak (2009): Direct Relief provided 478 clinics in 49 US states with H1N1 protective items to keep clinic workers healthy throughout flu season.
- In 2013, Direct Relief launched a program in partnership with Basic Health International to screen and treat women in Haiti for cervical cancer.
- Zika virus outbreak (2015): In 2016, Direct Relief established a Zika fund and helped fulfill requests for supplies in fourteen affected countries.
- DRC Ebola outbreak (2015): Since 2015, Direct Relief has provided $13.9 million in medical aid.
- Global COVID-19 pandemic (2019–2020): In January 2020, Direct Relief worked with FedEx Cares, the courier's global charitable platform, to fulfill an emergency order from medical staff in Wuhan's largest hospital, Wuhan Union Hospital.

Direct Relief committed an initial $2 million in emergency funding to support responses to the coronavirus in the U.S. Between January and April 2020, the organization had distributed more than 145,000 pounds of medical aid in response to the COVID-19 pandemic. Direct Relief shipped supplies to hospitals and clinics in all 50 US states as well as institutions in 32 countries. The organization also started a new COVID-19 fund to provide community health centers financial support for healthcare workers. 3M donated $10 million to the fund. By June 2020, over 518 health centers had received funding through the COVID-19 fund.

In May 2020, Direct Relief announced a partnership with FedEx Cares to ship personal protective equipment to underserved communities around the US. The charity also sent over 350,000 surgical masks, 30,000 face masks, and 10,000 goggles to Mexico.

In 2021, Direct Relief provided $5.2 million in COVID-19-related grants. This included a $1 million grant for the Navajo Nation and health agencies providing services to Navajo people, and $250,000 each to the Massachusetts and Mississippi associations of community health centers. Of the people served by these associations, over 90% live in or near poverty, and over 63% are members of racial or ethnic minority groups.

==== Wildfires ====
Direct Relief provides support to local and international wildfire incidents, including masks, vehicles, and funds to advance firefighter technology.

- Gap Fire (2008)
- Jesusita Fire (2009)
- Thomas Fire (2017)
- California wildfires (2018)
- Australia bushfires (2019–2020)
- Maui wildfires (2023): Direct Relief sent shipments that included a wildfire kit, emergency medical backpacks, and personal care kits. The nonprofit coordinated with the Hawaii Department of Health, the Federal Administration for Strategic Preparedness and Response Region 9, the Hawaii Primary Care Association, and several healthcare facilities in Hawaii. Direct Relief's initial aid commitment was $500,000.
- Palisades Fire (2025): Direct Relief provided medical aid, including medications and protective gear, to those affected by the Palisades Fire and the first responders battling it. They also offered financial support to community health providers to ensure continued care for impacted residents.
- Eaton Fire (2025): Direct Relief collaborated with two Koreatown YMCA locations to distribute free N95 masks to residents impacted by hazardous smoke.

==== Typhoons ====
- Typhoon Yutu (2018): The "super typhoon" hit the Northern Mariana Islands in October 2018. Direct Relief worked with Commonwealth Healthcare Corporation (the only hospital in the Northern Mariana Islands) and with other health facilities damaged by the storm to coordinate medical aid shipments. A shipment of 40,000 liters of drinking water along with other essential items was delivered in late October.

=== Maternal and child health ===
Direct Relief delivers medical aid to people in high-need areas worldwide by supporting partners that provide child and maternal health services through the full process of pregnancy. The organization provides midwives with the tools needed to provide delivery, antenatal, and postpartum care safely. In 2017, Direct Relief distributed 300 midwife kits to fourteen partners in seven countries in the Caribbean, Southeast Asia, and Sub-Saharan Africa, supporting 15,000 safe births.

- In July 2011, Direct Relief developed the Global Fistula Map in partnership with the United Nations Population Fund and the Fistula Foundation.
- In 2012, Direct Relief teamed up with Last Mile Health to launch a childhood pneumonia program in Liberia.
- Direct Relief provided midwife kits to hospitals and midwifery schools in Sierra Leone, Somaliland, and Nepal.
- Direct Relief increased support to Edna Adan University Hospital for the treatment and care of women with obstetric fistula. This included the construction and equipping of an operating theater and the development of a training curriculum for midwives and nurses.

=== Power for Health ===
Power for Health is a program launched in 2018 to help community health centers become more resilient in the face of power outages. A Power for Health grant covers the full cost of a rooftop solar and battery storage system and five years of maintenance support. From 2018 to June 2024, Direct Relief provided systems for 19 centers. As of June 2024, there were 48 projects under development in eight states and Puerto Rico.

==== Completed projects ====
- In 2024, Alliance Medical Center's clinic in Healdsburg, California, received $500,000 from the initiative for a rooftop solar and battery storage system.
- In March 2024, the initiative provided $10 million in grants for solar and storage microgrids for tribal communities in the U.S.
- Community Health Centers of the Central Coast installed a rooftop solar and battery system at its Skyway Telehealth Center in Santa Maria, California. The organization provides healthcare access for underserved communities across northern Santa Barbara and San Luis Obispo counties, supported by grants from Direct Relief.

=== Wars ===
In March 2022, Direct Relief partnered with the Ukrainian Ministry of Health to provide medical aid to organizations in the country. More than 125 tons of supplies were provided in that first month.

In April, the nonprofit launched Health 4 Ukraine with Pelion S.A., the largest healthcare company in Poland. The program covered 100% of prescription co-pays and 85% of non-prescription drug costs for Ukrainian refugees in Poland.

In December, the charity announced $7.9 million in cash aid for Ukrainians who had suffered injuries or trauma in the war. The cash was used for medical care and rehabilitation services. It brought Direct Relief's total cash assistance for programs benefiting Ukrainians and Ukrainian refugees to $29.4 million.

== Charity reviews and awards ==
- 2011 – Peter F. Drucker Award for Nonprofit Innovation
- 2012 – Designated by the National Association of Boards of Pharmacy as a Verified-Accredited Wholesale Distributors licensed to distribute pharmaceutical medicines to all 50 US states and Washington, D.C.
- 2013 – Esri President's Award for geographic information systems work to identify health condition patterns and medical needs
- 2014 – Power of Partnership Award – National Association of Community Health Centers
- 2014 – Charity Navigator ranked Direct Relief number one in its 2015 list, "10 of the Best Charities Everyone's Heard Of", and a "four-star" charity with a 99.94/100 charity score overall.
- 2015 – Fast Company named the organization among "the World's Top 10 Most Innovative Companies of 2015 in Not-For-Profit".
- 2015 – Forbes gave the organization a 100% fundraising efficiency rating.
- 2019 – Ranked third by Fast Company in the World's Most Innovative: Not-for-Profit Sector.
- 2022 – CharityWatch gave Direct Relief an A+ grade.
- 2022 – CharityWatch named Direct Relief to its list of Top-Rated Charities Providing Aid in Ukraine.
- 2023 – Charity Navigator gave Direct Relief a nonprofit rating of 100% for its impact, efficiency, and transparency, which included a score of 100% under the metric Accountability & Finance. This was the nonprofit's 14th consecutive four-star rating.
- 2023 – Direct Relief is the fifth-largest charity in the United States, according to Forbes magazine's annual list of the 100 largest U.S. charities by private donations.
- 2024 – Direct Relief is listed as one of the Best Humanitarian Relief Charities by Charity Navigator.
- 2025 – Seoul Peace Prize
