= TheSpeedGamers =

Video gamer group

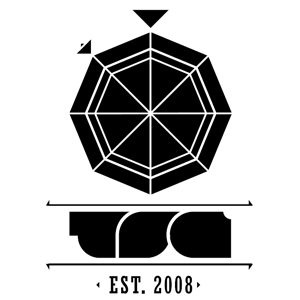
- Genre: Gaming Marathon Group
- Date: 2008-present
- Frequency: Quarterly Each Year
- Location: Arlington, Texas
- Years active: 17
- Inaugurated: March 14, 2008
- Founders: Britt LaRiviere & Chase LaRiviere
- Most recent: October 2025
- Website: www.tsg.tv

TheSpeedGamers (also abbreviated as TSG or TSG.TV) is a group of video gamers based out of Arlington, Texas, who raise money for various charities. They accomplish this by streaming live marathons of video games on Twitch (formerly Justin.tv). The group was founded by Britt LaRiviere in early 2008 and still hosts marathons regularly through the year. Viewers can interact with the commentators and other viewers via chat on Twitch. The group has raised over $940,000.00 for more than 20 different charities.

== History ==
Britt LaRiviere founded the group in March 2008. LaRiviere originally imagined the site as a source for gaming reviews, but over time, the idea evolved into forming a marathon group. Finally, they decided that if they ran marathons, then they should do it for a worthy cause. They adopted a Speedrun mentality and ran their first marathon, with a Zelda theme. Since then, the group has continued on for over nine years, hosting multiple marathons and still going strong .

On January 24, 2014, TheSpeedGamers re-branded themselves as TSG.TV with an ongoing overhaul of their website, forums, and other features. To mark the re-branding, the group did an unannounced 24-hour marathon of Sonic and Mario games, raising money for Mercy Corps. Donors had the option to apply their donation toward a total for Mario or a total for Sonic. At the end of the 24 hours, the respective totals were applied as a handicap system for a 40-minute computer-controlled Super Smash Brothers match between Mario and Sonic. The winner of that match would be the franchise for the December 2014 72-hour marathon, raising money for the Rocking H Ranch. Sonic won both the significant majority of the donations and the match, and the December marathon was for the Sonic the Hedgehog franchise.

== TSG 24/7 and Streams ==
Starting in February 2011, TheSpeedGamers started a 24/7 stream. Unlike marathons, no money was being raised. Also unlike marathons, games weren't continually being played. Instead, various music was played while the TheSpeedGamers' fans can chat in the chat room on Justin.tv. For a couple hours each day, Britt or Chase played games as part of an ongoing Let's Play. For the 7 days of the week, they usually played a different game each day. Then, the next week they picked up where they left off the previous week, thus making it a once a week Let's Play update. As of the end of the Metroid Marathon 2011, TheSpeedGamers stopped the 24/7 streams until further notice.

On Labor Day 2011, TheSpeedGamers once again started TSG 24/7. In the fall of 2011, TSG 24/7 became TSG Present!, a more occasional stream than the previous continuous efforts.

== Notable Marathons ==
- The Legend of Zelda Marathon I (March 14–17, 2008): This was TheSpeedGamers' first marathon, which lasted 72 hours. All the mainstream console Legend of Zelda games were played. They raised $1,090.00 for St. Jude Children's Research Hospital.
- Pokémon Marathon 2009 (December 18–21, 2009): TheSpeedGamers played the Third and Fourth Generation Pokémon games (Excluding Emerald and Platinum) to catch all 493 Pokémon. They raised $18,395.96 for Ally's House.
- Final Fantasy Marathon 2009 (July 17–24, 2009): TheSpeedGamers played a week-long marathon. During this time, they played 12 Final Fantasy titles and raised over $50,000 for ACT Today!, a charity for autism. They were awarded the Guinness World Record for "Longest Relay of a Japanese RPG". At one point, the marathon had more than 19,000 simultaneous viewers thanks to advertisement on MMO-Champion.
- Mario Marathon 2010 (June 11–19, 2010): TheSpeedGamers longest marathon. They played over 30 Mario games and raised $57,000 for ACT Today, they originally were only going to play for a week, but extended the marathon for an extra day because of donations. Thanks to a viewer embedding the stream on MMO-Champion, the views raised to over 30,000. Prizes given away included a Nintendo Wii, posters, hats, etc. At certain points, viewers who donated $100 could join a skype call with one of the commentators.
- Star Wars Marathon (July 8–15, 2011): A week-long marathon, raised $11,254 for Direct Relief (short of the $30,000 goal). At the conclusion of the marathon, announcements were made pushing the Zelda Marathon from the fall of 2011 to the Christmas marathon slot of 2011. The Pokémon Marathon scheduled for that slot was pushed to be made 2012's week-long event, later scheduled to start June 15, 2012.
- The Legend of Zelda Marathon 2011 (December 16–18, 2011, extended 24 hours to December 19, 2011, upon reaching their $15,000 goal): The charity for the marathon was The Rocking H Ranch (where this and a number of their previous marathons have been held). Thanks to a renewed push by the group, the marathon reached its $15,000 goal before the end of the initial 72 hours and was extended an additional 24 hours, the extra time highlighted by 2011 Zelda release The Legend of Zelda: Skyward Sword. On December 29, 2011, on TheSpeedGamers' Twitter account, it was announced that the final grand total for the marathon was $20,016.00. Since the marathon reached its "new goal" of $20,000, as stated during the extension, TheSpeedGamers announced that their Christmas 2012 marathon would be a marathon of games within the Mario franchise.
- Pokémon Marathon 2012 (June 15–22, 2012, 168 hours): The charity for the fourth-annual week-long marathon was ACT Today. The renewed push after 2011's week-long marathon continued, as a series of cutthroat auctions for various donated artwork aided TheSpeedGamers to reach their highest donation total in history, over $59,000, beating the record set in 2010's week-long Mario Marathon.
- Indiethon (April 25–28, 2014): TheSpeedGamers partnered with Humble Bundle in spring 2014 to raise money for Direct Relief, and a total of $122,607.88 was raised for the charity through the bundle.
- Pokémon Sun & Moon Marathon (December 16–20, 2016): Weeks after the launch of Pokémon Sun & Moon on the Nintendo 3DS, TheSpeedGamers held a marathon with the goal of catching every Pokémon available in-game at the time, which was accomplished on the final day of the event. The marathon helped to raise money for buildOn, and the funds went toward the building of a school in Mali.
- The Legend of Zelda: Breath of the Wild Marathon (March 3–6, 2017, 90 hours): To celebrate the launch of the Nintendo Switch, The Legend of Zelda: Breath of the Wild, and the 9-year anniversary of TheSpeedGamers, the group held its first launch marathon that began as soon as the game released in North America.
- Ten-Year Anniversary The Legend of Zelda Marathon (March 9–13, 2018, 96 hours): In honor of the ten-year anniversary of TheSpeedGamers, a 96-hour marathon of The Legend of Zelda franchise was held for St. Jude Children's Research Hospital.

== Marathon and Special Event List ==
	Marathon	Date	Length	Charity	Money Raised
1	The Legend of Zelda Marathon I	March 14–17, 2008	72 Hours	St. Jude Children's Research Hospital	$1,090.00
2	The Legend of Zelda Marathon II	June 13–16, 2008	72 Hours	Giggles Therapy	$1,450.75
3	Mario Marathon 2008	July 11–13, 2008	48 Hours	None	N/A
4	Metroid Marathon 2008	August 15–18, 2008	72 Hours	St. Jude Children's Research Hospital	$6,123.79
5	Mother/Earthbound Marathon 2008	August 28–31, 2008	55 Hours	None; support of American localization (PK Siege)	N/A
6	Halo Marathon	September 26–27, 2008	24 Hours	None	N/A
7	Halloween Marathon 2008	October 31-November 2, 2008	48 Hours	Lupus Foundation of America	$1,060.00
8	Pokémon Marathon 2008	December 19–22, 2008	72 Hours	ACT Today!	$5,923.69
9	The Legend of Zelda Marathon 2009	March 13–16, 2009	72 Hours	Ally's House	$6,235.39
10	Mother/Earthbound Marathon 2009	May 15–18, 2009	72 Hours	Susan G. Komen for the Cure	$10,586.00
11	Metal Gear Marathon	June 19–22, 2009	72 Hours	None	N/A
12	Final Fantasy Marathon 2009	July 17–24, 2009	168 Hours	ACT Today!	$50,734.63
13	Mega Man Marathon 2009	August 14–17, 2009	72 Hours	Earth Day Network	$7,188.06
14	Resident Evil Marathon 2009	October 30-November 1, 2009	49 Hours (due to Daylight Saving Time)	Diabetes Research and Wellness Foundation	$16,349.54
15	Pokémon Marathon 2009	December 18–21, 2009	72 Hours	Ally's House	$18,395.96
16	Metroid Marathon 2010	March 12–15, 2010	72 Hours	Halton Autistic Family Support Group (HAFS)	$11,616.50
17	Mother/Earthbound Marathon 2010	May 7–10, 2010	48 Hours	Susan G. Komen for the Cure	$10,749.32
18	Mario Marathon 2010	June 11–19, 2010	189 Hours (due to 21-hour extension)	ACT Today!	$57,399.00
	The Summer of Zelda	July 1-August 1, 2010	27 Nightly Streams	ACT Today!	$20,000.00 ^{*}
19	Assassin's Creed/Prince of Persia Marathon	August 20–23, 2010	72 Hours	Gulf Restoration Network	$10,550.04
	Community Stream Month 2010	October 2010	N/A	ACT Today!	$2,075.00
20	Castlevania Marathon 2010	October 29–31, 2010	48 Hours	Rocking H Ranch	$6,926.50
21	Kingdom Hearts Marathon	December 17–20, 2010	72 Hours	BestFriends.org	$10,624.65
22	Retro Pokémon Marathon 2011	March 11–14, 2011	72 Hours	ALS Association	$15,394.03
23	Metroid Marathon 2011	May 6–9, 2011	72 Hours	Civic Force	$8,251.85
24	Star Wars Marathon	July 8–15, 2011	168 Hours	Direct Relief	$11,254.09
25	The Legend of Zelda Marathon 2011	December 16–20, 2011	96 Hours (24-hour extension)	Rocking H Ranch	$20,016.00
26	Pokémon Marathon 2012	June 15–22, 2012	168 Hours	ACT Today!	$59,324.36
27	Mario Marathon 2012	December 14–17, 2012	72 Hours	Make-A-Wish Foundation	$12,056.00
28	Mega Man Marathon 2013	March 8–12, 2013	96 Hours (24-hour extension)	Rocking H Ranch	$11,880.50
29	Final Fantasy Marathon 2013	June 24-July 1, 2013	168 Hours	ACT Today!	$32,753.00
30	Halloween Marathon 2013	October 18–21, 2013	72 Hours	Heifer International	$14,598.50
31	The Legend of Zelda Marathon 2013	December 13–16, 2013	72 Hours	Mercy Corps	$17,852.00
	Mario vs. Sonic Minithon	January 24–25, 2014	24 Hours	Mercy Corps	$1,257.00
	Donkey Kong Minithon	March 7–8, 2014	24 hours	Heifer International	$1,128.00
32	Indiethon	April 25–28, 2014	72 Hours	Direct Relief	$122,607.88
33	Pokémon Marathon 2014	June 20–27, 2014	168 Hours	St. Jude Children's Research Hospital	$32,073.33
	Minithon Series	July–November, 2014	Varies	ACT Today	~$3,000 ***
34	Sonic Marathon	December 12–15, 2014	72 Hours	Rocking H Ranch	$4,321.00
35	Mario Marathon 2015	July 17–24, 2015	168 Hours	St. Jude's Children Research Hospital	$29,027.00
36	Retro Pokémon Marathon 2015	December 17–21, 2015	96 Hours (24-hour extension)	Rocking H Ranch	$16,300.00
37	The Legend of Zelda Marathon 2016: Hyrule vs. Lorule	June 24-July 1, 2016	168 Hours	St. Jude Children Research Hospital	$40,180.00
38	Trick 'r' Treat Marathon 2016	October 14–17, 2016	72 Hours	St. Jude Children Research Hospital	$4,553.27
39	Pokémon Sun & Moon Marathon	December 16–20, 2016	96 Hours (24-hour extension)	buildOn	$9,226.13
40	The Legend of Zelda: Breath of the Wild Marathon	March 3–6, 2017	90 Hours (started at midnight CST)	buildOn	$2,000.01
41	Final Fantasy Marathon 2017: Pixels vs. Polygons	July 14–20, 2017	144 Hours (24-hour extension)	St. Jude Children's Research Hospital	$33,580.00
42	Resident Evil Marathon 2017	October 13–16, 2017	72 Hours	Direct Relief	$7,042.69
43	Mario Marathon 2017	December 15–18, 2017	96 Hours (24-hour extension)	ACT Today!	$6,518.00
44	The Legend of Zelda Marathon 2018	March 9–13, 2018	96 Hours	St. Jude Children's Research Hospital	$10,624.00
45	Pokémon Marathon 2018	June 8–15, 2018	168 Hours	St. Jude Children's Research Hospital	$17,260.00
46	Soulsborne Marathon 2018	October 12–15, 2018	72 Hours	Direct Relief	$8,286.00
47	Nintendo All-Stars Marathon 2018	December 14–18, 2018	96 Hours (24-hour extension)	St. Jude Children's Research Hospital	$9,105.00
48	The Legend of Zelda Marathon 2019: Hyrule vs. Lorule II	July 12–19, 2019	168 Hours	St. Jude Children's Research Hospital	$28,496.00 (Includes May 2019 PLAYLIVE Total)
49	Castlevania Marathon 2019	October 18–21, 2019	72 Hours	Direct Relief	$6,000.00
50	Retro Pokémon Marathon 2019	December 13–16, 2019	72 Hours	St. Jude Children's Research Hospital	$10,230.00
	TSG Generations! 2020	May 1–31, 2020	Daily Streams	St. Jude Children's Research Hospital	$8,800.00
51	Mario Marathon 2020	July 17–20, 2020	72 Hours	St. Jude Children's Research Hospital	$7,200.00
52	Resident Evil Marathon 2020	October 16–19, 2020	72 Hours	Direct Relief	$3,000.00
53	Nintendo All-Stars Marathon 2020	December 18–21, 2020	72 Hours	St. Jude Children's Research Hospital	$5,028.51
54	The Legend of Zelda Marathon 2021: Return to Hyrule	July 15–19, 2021	96 Hours	St. Jude Children's Research Hospital	$12,345.00
55	Resident Evil Marathon 2021	October 29 - November 1, 2021	72 Hours	Direct Relief	$4,245.69
56	Pokémon Gen 4 & More! Marathon	December 17–20, 2021	72 Hours	St. Jude Children's Research Hospital	$5,007.00
57	Metroid Marathon 2022	March 11–13, 2022	48 Hours	ZERO Prostate Cancer	$3,195.00
58	Mario + Donkey Kong Marathon	July 8-13, 2022	120 Hours	St. Jude Children's Research Hospital	$10,041.00
59	The Legend of Zelda Marathon 2023	July 12-18, 2023	144 Hours	St. Jude Children's Research Hospital	$12,280.42
60	Castlevania Marathon 2023	October 13-15, 2023	48 Hours	ZERO Prostate Cancer	$3,000.00
61	Pokémon Marathon 2023: Rocket's Revenge	December 15-18, 2023	72 Hours	St. Jude Children's Research Hospital	$3,122.00
62	Mega Man Remote Marathon 2024	March 2024		charity: water	$640.00
63	Final Fantasy Marathon 2024	July 8-14, 2024	120 Hours	St. Jude Children's Research Hospital	$5,700.00
64	NES Champs: Live from GCX	August 16-17, 2024		St. Jude Children's Research Hospital	$780.00
65	Sonic Remote Marathon 2024	September 2024	96 Hours	Children’s Tumor Foundation	$2,000.00
66	Soulsborne Marathon 2024	October 11-14, 2024	72 Hours	ZERO Prostate Cancer	$2,026.00
67	The Legend of Zelda Marathon 2024	December 13-16, 2024	72 Hours	American Cancer Society	$4,204.20
68	Cozython Remote Marathon	March 14-16, 2025	72 Hours	charity: water	$1,141.50
69	Pokémon Marathon 2025: Rocket's Revenge 2	July 11-18, 2025	168 Hours	St. Jude Children's Research Hospital	$6,920.00
70	Nights of Fright	October 17-19, 2025	52 Hours	ZERO Prostate Cancer	$2,400.00
71	Jumpmen: Mario & Donkey Kong Marathon	December 12-15, 2025	72 Hours	charity: water	$3,010.00
72	The Legend of Zelda Marathon 2026: Hyrule vs. Lorule III	June 8-14, 2026	144 Hours	St. Jude Children's Research Hospital	$8,018.00
73	Resident Evil Marathon 2026	October 9-12, 2026	72 Hours	ZERO Prostate Cancer	
74	Square Enix X Kingdom Hearts: Unlimited Dreams	December 2026			
	Total				$975,378.78

^{*}: The Summer of Zelda, a month-long effort of nightly streams, was originally designed to raise money for ACT Today! through the Pepsi Refresh Project in place at the time. The second weekend of the month, a user notified TheSpeedGamers that ACT Today! was also in the running with Chase Community Giving on Facebook, a similar project by Chase Bank. With only three days to do it, the community was able to garner enough votes to gain the charity a $20,000 donation for placing in the top 200 charities at the event.
^{***}: During a few months in mid-2014, there were several minithons which all aimed to raise money for ACT Today. About $3,000 was raised in total. Exact total still needs to be added.
