= East Bardera Mothers and Children's Hospital =

Bardera Maternity and Children's Hospital
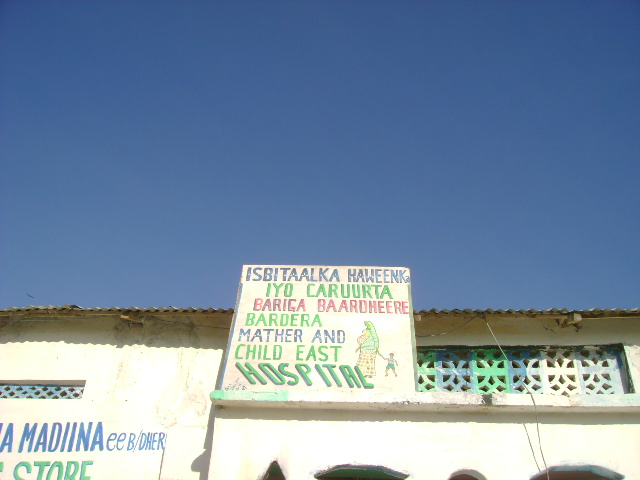
- East Bardera Mother's and Children's Hospital

Geography
- Location: Baardheere, Gedo, Somalia
- Coordinates: 2.340692°N 42.283044°E (approximate)

Organisation
- Funding: Non-profit hospital
- Type: Specialist

Services
- Beds: 10
- Speciality: Obstetrics (Antenatal/Postnatal), Gynecology

History
- Former name: Isbitaalka Bariga Baardheere
- Opened: May 2006

Links
- Other links: Teaching hospitals, Maternity hospitals

East Bardera Mothers and Children's Hospital (EBMCH) is a non-profit institution women's and children's hospital located in Baardheere, Somalia. The hospital was started by expatriate Somalis based in North America. The hospital, locally referred to as Isbitaalka Bariga Baardheere, is managed by a team of nurses in addition to one of the most experienced midwives in the Bardera district of the Gedo region.

With a competent medical staff and access to supplies from safe markets in Canada and the United States, East Bardera Mothers and Children's Hospital stands as one of the best-organized hospitals in Somalia. Women also make up 75% of the hospital's staff, which offers women and children a safe and comfortable environment in which to receive medical advice and treatment.

== History ==
EBMCH in Baardheere, Somalia was established in May 2006. Bardera did not have anything resembling maternity hospital for the longest time before EBMCH came into the picture. Bardera is the home of the largest district and most populous city in Gedo Region.

UN agencies such as WHO, UNICEF and other international NGOs such MSF have supported the health-care services which are carried out in Bardera District. Just as recently as 2007, Medicines Sans Frontier (MSF) of Spain, has tried to man, equip and re-supply the main Bardera Hospital which was out of service since 1994. Some armed militias have obstructed this noble cause. EBMCH and two other MCHs with even lesser resources have been the only medical centers serving Bardera city.

The majority of medicines, medical supplies, and information comes from friends of the hospital who live in the United States and Canada. The hospital has some of the most up-to-date equipment in all of the MCHs in Bardera City. The general hospital which served the community during the previous 40 years, was demolished by the central government in 1991.

Well-trained medical staff who are working towards the same goal and safe medicine from Canada and United States is making East Bardera Hospital one of the best managed expanded MCHs in Somalia. All of the beds in the hospital were welded by a local entrepreneur, and as expansion is sought to further serve the community, more supplies will be bought from the community business people.

== Creation of Bardera Maternity Hospital ==
East Bardera Mothers and Children's Hospital was envisioned to be a step-by-step and long-term oriented medical facility where basic medical needs of Gedo's largest city would be met. With the support of a few friends, including Dr. Aden Loyan and trained nurses, EBMCH founders are able to pay all the expenses of EBMCH including medicines and medical supplies, rent for facilities, and staff salaries. Annual operating costs for Bardera Maternity Hospital is little over $30,000.

The founder of EBMCH retells a story of a woman who in early 2006 had received financial support from overseas family members and after a relatively normal pregnancy, gave birth and almost died from ensuing bleeding, receiving no immediate medical advice and no recovery help of any kind in Bardera. Then the question, "Imagine, what other women in similar situations are going through across Somalia and in Bardera?" is asked.

The woman in the story, How EBMCH Started, could have purchased medical supplies such as supplements long before she got weak and could have also gotten nutritional advice, but there was no maternity hospital in Bardera at the time. It is concluded that other women were suffering many times worse. Therefore, he set out to create EBMCH with few thousand dollars on hand. First, as a maternity hospital, and second, as a place with knowledgeable staff who can offer all the possible medical services to the community. To locals, EBMCH is more than a place for women and children. All sorts of people seek medical services from EBMCH. Among other things, unexpired medicines and reliable midwifery services are some of the best-liked services and attractions at EBMCH.

Correct nutritional information and basic prenatal services will go a long way for pregnant women in Bardera as food is mostly available in the largely farming town. Over 96% of households in Bardera purchase their household food needs.

== Maternity Services at East Bardera Hospital ==
Women in Bardera now get the advice of trained nurses and midwife. Few hospitals in Somalia offer maternity and children's services. Most hospitals in Somalia are concerned with wounded people from war zones. Bardera Mothers and Children's hospital was established to give women and children the care they deserve. Expecting mothers and nursing women also get reliable supplements and medicines as well as medical advice throughout the pregnancy and after the child is born. The EBMCH has a pharmacy and supplies are being imported from Canada and the US with the help of EBMCH friends as well as local NGOs. The Bardera Red Crescent donated supplements to the EBMCH, and the UNICEF arm based in Nairobi gave some medical supplies to the EBMCH in early 2007.

== EBMCH as a maternity hospital ==
East Bardera MCH

East Bardera Mothers and Children's Hospital was initially envisioned as a maternity hospital but the need of the community for broad medical services facility was an immediate need which needed an urgent solution. Currently, all women and mothers can get medical advice and relatively cheap medications. The UNICEF has afforded EBMCH some supplements for expecting women and new mothers. Nurses make scheduled visits to homes of new mothers where they dispense basic medical services including free supplements for the mothers as well for the new babies.

EBMCH name has been changed to Bardera Maternity and Children's Hospital. At the beginning, the name of the hospital included the word "east", both sides of Bardera is now served by this maternity and children's hospital since December 2008. Hence, the name change.

Since there is no functioning ministry of health, the hospital staff does whatever it can to help improve the health of the community, particularly, the health of women and children. Prevention of problems is the goal of the staff at East Bardera Mothers and Children's Hospital.

== East Bardera Hospital services and facilities ==
Patients who receive medical services include children as well as adults. The hospital mostly focuses on women's and children's health services. Nurses and midwives go out into the community where they give medical advice and services to women in their homes. During 2007, over 1400 women received prenatal and maternity help in their own homes or at EBMCH facilities.

Maternity Services Rendered 2007 & First Quarter of 2008

Year	At EBMCH	Cared at Home	'Stillbirth	Total
2007	1,478	1,481	10	2969
2008	313	770	2	1085*

*2008 first quarter figures. The previous year shows almost equal number of women being helped at their homes compared to those at EBMCH maternity ward.

== 2008 annual report ==
Adults	<5 Years	< 1 Year	Prenatal Care	Live Deliveries	Stillborn	Total
818	655	201	977	931	29	3,611

Facilities at East Bardera Mothers and Children's Hospital contain five rooms, with three rooms having patient beds including a delivery bed. As of the end of 2007, no other MCH in Bardera offered full maternity services and this has overwhelmed the staff at East Bardera Mothers and Children's Hospital in their quest to provide maternity services to women across the city. Data compiled by the staff shows close to 3000 women being helped either at the EBMCH facility or in their own homes. Lack of emergency response vehicles made half of those women who were given maternity services to give birth at home.

== 2009 and 2010 ==
Armed opposing groups made Bardera one of their important war fronts during early 2009. Most public services including hospitals and schools were shut down for a considerable period of time. Supplies became hard to be brought in. There was a lot of chaos and inconveniences for the population as well as service providers in the region.

=== 2010 Figures ===
Adults	<5 Years	< 1 Year	Prenatal Care	Live Deliveries	Stillborn	Total
380	75	41	187	134*	5	822*

*Deliveries include all services including those done at home by the hospital due to lack of transportation.

**August 2010 – December 2010. Factors contributing to service decrease included lack of transportation, patient financial difficulties due to drought and security issues.

As the situation has changed in late 2010, when the hospital was moved to its third location in four years. Operating hours were increased to 24 hours. Teams on duty consist of 3 midwives, one nurse and junior pharmacist are on duty.

The hospital has set up mechanisms where maternity cases are transferred to Mandera, Kenya. Supplies and availability of trained medical staff are coming back to normal again.

Source: Dahir Abdi Dini, Field Office Assistant, 2009-December 2010

== Bardera West Maternity Unit ==
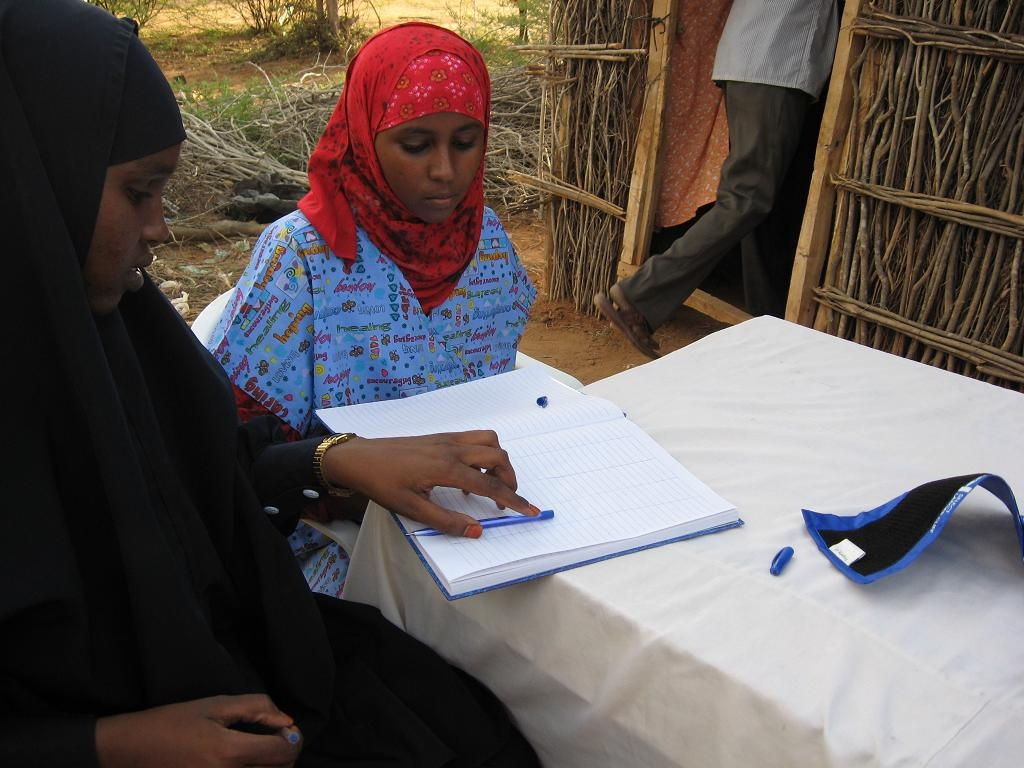
Director Fardowsa Abdinur Hashi and Assistant Nimco Ibrahim

The west side of Bardera has a new maternity unit. This unit was opened on December 13, 2008. Present at the opening occasion of this unit, was the head of Bardera Council of Elders, Hussein Ali Bihi. This unit has a staff of three people. One of the most liked midwives in Bardera, Fadumo Mohamed Elmi and her assistant Nimo Ibrahim Afyare will be the two people running West Bardera Maternity Unit.

Midwife Fadumo Mohamed Elmi has served Bardera for decades. East Bardera Mothers and Children's Hospital is pleased to have her on board at this stage. One of the best things that will happen now is that, both midwives, Markabo Bilal Kulow and Fadumo Mohamed Elmi will train new midwives, so that the region will always have a fresh helping hands. East Bardera Mothers and Children's Hospital and the new Bardera Poytechnic College, combined with the experience of Markabo and Fadumo, women in Bardera region will have better health services.

Most services and businesses in Bardera are located on the east side of town but the population on the western side of Bardera has been on the rise for two decades now. East Bardera Mothers and Children's Hospital director, Fardowsa Abdinur Hashi and her staff have always given their best for health services directed at the residents on the west side of Bardera. The two Units, one on the east and the new west-side unit will have close cooperations in terms of scheduled work, supplies, and joint-trainings.

Fardowsa spoke about the importance of people of this side of Bardera doing their part, in terms of informing their neighbors and friends about the services available at West Bardera Maternity Unit. Supplements for pregnant girls and women, the help available to them up to the birthing process and beyond. Just as the rest of maternity hospitals in the region, this unit is lacking some the basic equipment such as ultrasound.

== Staff at EBMCH ==
The medical team at East Bardera Mothers and Children's Hospital numbers six in total. There is the head nurse who is also the Director of East Bardera Mothers and Children's Hospital. Other staff includes an additional nurse, a midwife, an assistant midwife, a junior pharmacist, and an assistant pharmacist.

Nurse Fardowsa serves as the Assistant Head Nurse at East Bardera Mothers and Children's Hospital. She has held this position since October 2007. Markabo Bilal Kulow, the head midwife, has served the Bardera community for over 10 years as a midwife.

The staff at EBMCH is hard at work in finding solutions to one deadly occurrence in Somalia during each dry season: the deadly watery diarrhea or Acute Watery Diarrhea (AWD). Communities across Somalia suffer from this annual occurrence. The East Bardera Hospital is planning to establish a permanent treatment center for this disease and other communicable diseases such as Tuberculosis and HIV AIDS.

The hospital currently gets many of its medical supplies from the United States and Canada; the majority of medications at larger Somali markets such as Mogadishu and Kismayo are often unreliable and sometimes dangerous for consumption.

== Bardera Polytechnic College Trains More Medical Staff ==
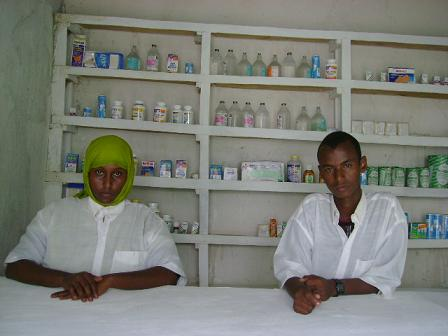
Pharmacy Staff at East Bardera Hospital

Newly established Bardera Poytechnic College is focusing among other things, training more medical staff for the local health centers. And East Bardera Mothers and Children's Hospital is among the first to receive new supply of trained medical personal. As the population of Bardera increases, and more services are needed, it is essential to have a place that trains additional staff.

Current staff from EBMCH have had their medical training outside of Bardera. EBMCH and Bardera Polytechnic have already established working relations. The Dean (Hormuud) of Bardera Polytechnic, Mohamed Abdudullahi Barre, is a friend and a supporter of East Bardera Mothers and Children's Hospital. Mohamed was a longtime English Language Instructor, who worked at various education centers in Bardera District. There are at least 20 new medical students for the first patch of students at Bardera Polytechnic. These students will fill different fields such as public health sciences, nursing and junior pharmacy, and these future leaders will have two years of training, each.

== Community Education Against FGM And Other Health Information Sessions ==
Staff at East Bardera Hospital have initially taken up the task of going to Bardera city neighborhoods where they give basic health education in which the community will benefit in the long term. One issue which has affected many women and young girls is female genital mutilation (FGM). Since the last twenty-five years or so, there has been slow but growing attention being given to this subject. Educated women and their families are aware of the health problems faced by women who have gone through this terrible procedure and they choose not to take their daughters to these mutilating practitioners.

Some of the problems resulting from FGM include birthing problems, unusual infections, and numerous other complications. Nurses at EBMCH regularly hold sessions dealing with FGM at all community outings. Neighborhood Level community health information sessions include:

1. The need for every woman to take care of her health by visiting clinics often and ask about specific treatments
2. Getting supplements and proper nutrition during and after pregnancy
3. Taking part in women's health-oriented organizations' meetings

Nurses at East Bardera tell women: Healthy women raise healthy children. This statement often results other women and men supporting female family members where they are afforded financial and other forms of help such as family members accepting medical advice given to mothers and young women when they bring such information home.

== Pharmacy at the East Bardera Maternity Hospital ==
Bardera Maternity Hospital Pharmacy

From the beginning, it was evident that some of the illnesses pregnant women face in Bardera could have been prevented with safe supplements and with basic prenatal care. Supplies and medicine at the East Bardera Maternity hospital were purchased according to the needs of women and children. As there is no major hospital serving in this community of over 100,000 people, patients of all sorts, ordinary folks, walk-in patients with variety of illnesses and men and women of all ages come to the pharmacy of East Bardera Mothers and children's Hospital to fill out their prescriptions.

Before the establishment of EBMCH in 2006, any sick person in Bardera and surrounding areas would go to private pharmacies for treatment. And most of the drugs available in Bardera were not reliable in most part due to lack safety enforcement and the unknown origins of these medicines. East Bardera Hospital Pharmacy operates as a non-profit, hence, the need to obtain and give out unreliable drugs is out of the question. This obviously proved wonderful for the population of Bardera who seek medical treatment at East Bardera Maternity Hospital and its different departments such as maternity, children's services and department of pharmacy.

The pharmacy is supplied with medicine from Canada and US. Most of these drugs are non-prescription in nature. EBMCH hospital pharmacy is staffed with a junior pharmacist and her assistant. As you can see from the pharmacy shelves, there is no whole lot of supplies here. But one of the greatest things at East Bardera Mothers and Children's Hospital is the quality of medicines. All of these medicines have been purchased from safe markets. Aside from supplements and painkillers, stomach worm drugs are some of the most effective drugs available at the East Bardera Maternity Hospital. This was reported by patients and communitywide individuals as a feedback to the hospital services in general, and as an anecdotic fact given to the pharmacy staff by patients who previously received drugs or treatment from the hospital.

== Community participation in strengthening EBMCH ==
The EBMCH staff encourages visitors from North America and Europe to bring well-preserved over-the-counter medicines and donate them to the EBMCH's Pharmacy Department. They have requested medications that have a long shelf-life because non-air-conditioned room temperatures are too high for many medicines and creates a condition for expedited expiration for these medicines.

Future expansions for Bardera Maternity Hospital include construction for a new facility 1.2 km east of the Bardera Arc, which is planned to start in October 2009 and acquiring at least two ambulances. Both activities need the support of the community, especially, Diaspora friends of the hospital and anonymous donors and institutions.
