= Hargeisa Canadian Medical Center =

Hospital in Somaliland

Geography
- Location: Hargeisa, Woqooyi Galbeed, Somaliland
- Coordinates: 9.561538°N 44.088708°E

Organisation
- Type: General

Services
- Emergency department: Yes
- Beds: 20

History
- Founded: 1999

Links
- Website: http://hargeisacanadian.com
- Lists: Hospitals in Somaliland

Hargeisa Canadian Medical Center (HCMC) is a medical and research center located in Hargeisa, Somaliland. It was founded in 1999, and is one of the pre-eminent medical facilities in the country. It consists of a walk-in clinic, a diagnostic center, a medical laboratory and a pharmacy.

== Overview ==
All of the physicians that work at the Hargeisa Canadian Medical Center were trained in Italy and/or Canada.

HCMC is known for its humanitarian endeavors, such as offering free medical treatment on Mondays and Thursdays to low or no income families. The hospital's physicians also often travel to impoverished villages and treat the locals.

As of May 2011, the medical center has been expanded into a hospital.
