= 2014 timeline of the Somali Civil War =

This is a 2014 timeline of events in the Somali Civil War (2009–present).

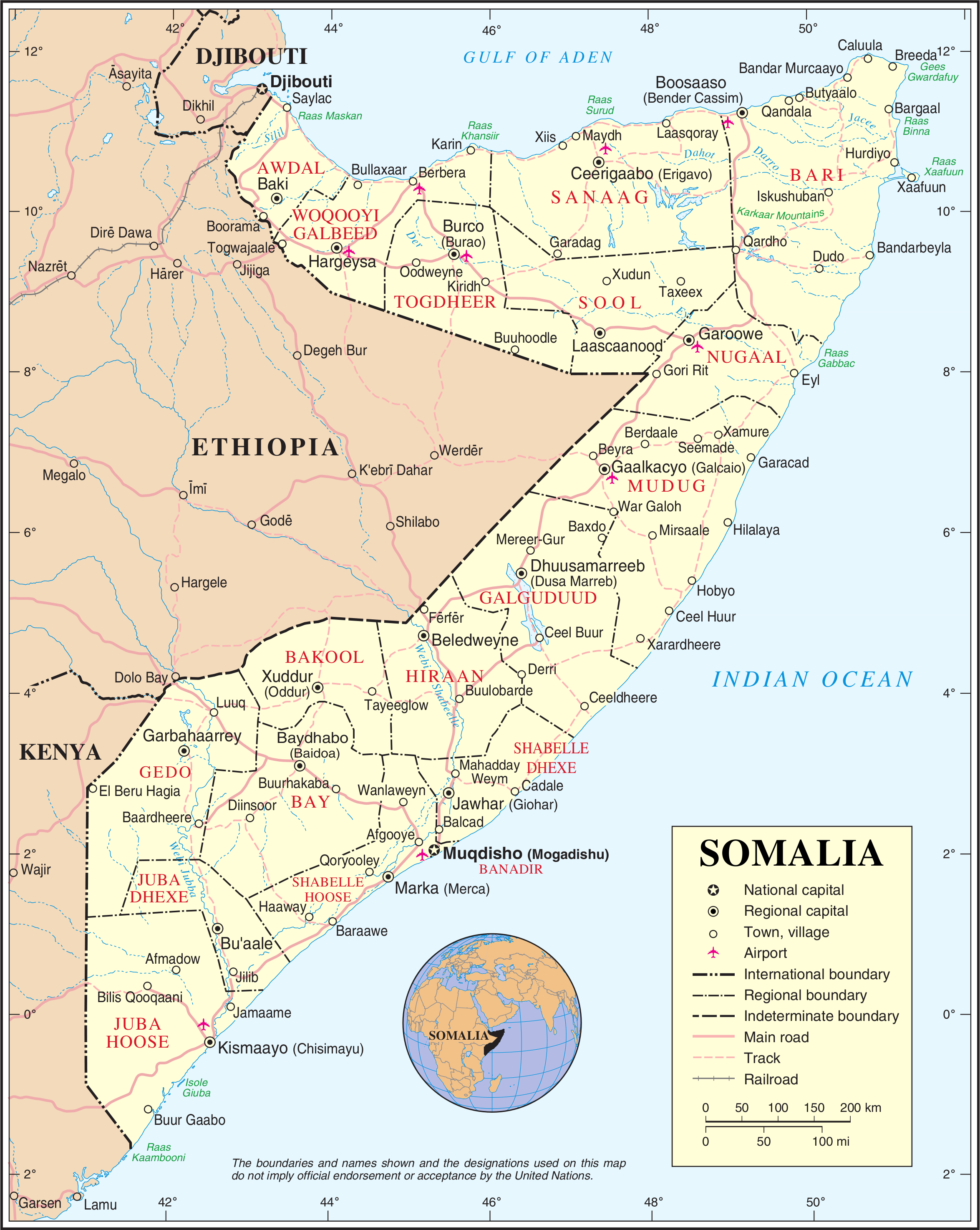
General map of Somalia

== January ==
=== January 1 ===
- Hundreds of Ethiopian troops backed by armored vehicles and tanks enter Baidoa, the capital of Bay region, establishing new military bases in the city's main entrance and in a factory "to assist the Somali government to root out al-Shabab in 2014 from the entire country", according to Bay's Deputy Governor Mr. Shine Moalim Nurow. An unknown number of Ethiopian troops were already in Somalia over the past three years. In 2014, Ethiopian troops are set to join the African Union Mission (AMISOM), which is set to expand from 17,731 to 22,126 troops.
- At least 11 people were killed and 17 injured in a bomb attack at the Jazeera Hotel in one of the most secure areas of Mogadishu. The first two bombs came in quick succession and were followed by gunfire from Somali security forces. The third blast took place about an hour later when a bomb went off inside a car that was being searched by the military. The attack happened less than 24 hours after warnings by Al Shabaab spokesman Abdulaziz Musab who called upon Somali citizens to avoid social areas and important government installations referring to possible attacks by the group in the New Year. It was claimed by the organisation a day later, saying that it targeted "a meeting of senior 'apostate' intelligence officials". The attack killed two police commanders (Mursal Showre and Abdikani Ahmed Ga’al) and was publicly condemned by i.a. France, the UK, the UN Security Council and by UN Secretary General Ban Ki-moon.
- Al Shabaab arrests between 10 and "dozens" aid workers of the Red Cross and Red Crescent in Buale and Sako, the major towns in the Middle Juba region, claiming that they work as under cover intelligence for their opponents.
- As hundreds of families displaced by recent inter-clan conflicts in Middle Shabelle region have sought shelter in makeshift camps in Jowhar airport, Middle Shabelle administration officials and traditional elders call for peaceful coexistence between the various clans in the region. Middle Shabelle Governor, Abdi Jinow Alasow, calls on the inhabitants of Geedo-Berkaan (7 km northeast of Jowhar) to avoid further recurrence of inter-clan conflicts.

=== January 4 ===
- 600 new recruits join Somalia's National Army after four months of military training at Dhusamareb's 21st military training base (in Galguduud region). Colonel Sulub Ahmed Dirie addressed the graduation ceremony saying the 600 were ready to defend their country from "invading terrorists".
- In the vicinity of Buur-Hakaba (Bay region), an official from the World Health Organization is kidnapped by al-Shabaab and abducted to Dinsoor.

=== January 6 ===
- Hundreds of families who were internally displaced by recent conflicts in Middle Shabelle region are being resettled back to their homes by the regional administration in collaboration with Jowhar district officials. More than 140 families are resettled in Sabun area, two months after they sought shelter in a makeshift camp near Jowhar airport.

=== January 8 ===
- Al-Shabaab announces that it is banning wireless Internet in the areas of Somalia that it controls. Internet Service Providers were given 15 days to terminate their service and warned of sanctions if they did not comply. The militants elaborated that they would tolerate internet access via cable but not by satellite. The insurgent group is on Reporters Without Borders' list of "Predators of Freedom of Information", and regards internet use as a form of spying.

=== January 9 ===
- On January 9, the Kenyan Defense Force launched three air strikes from an F-5 jet at an al-Shabaab gathering in Gedo province. The attack was intended to kill al-Shabaab's leader, Ahmed Godane, and killed 57 militants (including 6 key commanders), wounded 120 more, and destroyed eight vehicles used by the militant group. The air strike came after AMISOM received intelligence regarding the location of Ahmed Godane, who left the meeting a mere thirty minutes before the attack.

=== January 10 ===
- Col. Tom Davis, a spokesman for the United States Africa Command, announces that the U.S. has established a military coordination cell in Mogadishu. The deployment came at the request of the Somali government and AMISOM, who approached Defense Secretary Chuck Hagel about the move in September 2013. According to Davis, the cell consists of a small team of advisers rather than combat troops, and also includes planners and communicators between the Somali authorities and AMISOM. It is intended to provide consultative and planning support to the allied forces in order to enhance their capacity and to promote peace and security throughout the country and wider region. The coordination cell's formation is open-ended, with rotating personnel. Members reportedly first started to arrive in October to organize their office and living spaces at the capital's main airport. According to a defense official, the unit has a staff of fewer than five personnel and became fully operational in Mogadishu by mid-December 2013. A few days later, Al Shabaab commander Sheikh Ali Jabal in a voice recording posted online vowed that the group would attack the new US Forces in Mogadishu.

=== January 13 ===
- Officials of the Hiran region successfully broker a peace pact between warring clans in the Defow, Kabhanley and Jerrey areas in Hiran region after three days of intense negotiations.
- Government officials in Gedo region state that seven Al Shabaab fighters have defected and surrendered to them. Two months earlier, government officials had publicly announced that any al Shabaab defector would be given a full amnesty to minimize number of Somali youth lured by the group. Since then, three to ten surrender each month, according to Col. Abbas Gurey, government military officer in Gedo.

=== January 14 ===
- Abdullahi Dalas, a well-known militant Al Shabaab officer in the Juba region, surrenders himself to the Afmadow District authorities in Lower Juba.
- Fighting erupts at night after al-Shabaab launches an assault on government bases at Burane and Mahaday, two strategic towns near Jowhar, the provincial capital of Middle Shabelle region. At least 15 people are killed during the ambush attack, 6 of them Somali soldiers. Both sides exchange heavy and small firearms in the pitch combat, while reports claim that al-Shabaab destroyed Somali government military facilities in Mahaday. Before daybreak, the government troops backed by African Union forces secure the towns, and repel the al-Shabaab fighters from the area following a fierce counter-attack.

=== January 22 ===
- At a ceremony in Baidoa, (Bay region), 4,395 troops from the Ethiopian National Defence Forces (ENDF) are integrated into the African Union Mission to Somalia (AMISOM). This ceremony follows the adoption of Security Council resolution 2124(2013) of 12 November 2013 which allows AMISOM to expand from 17,731 to 22,126 troops and acceptance of Ethiopia's offer to the African Union to deploy its troops in Somalia under AMISOM. The Ethiopian troops will work alongside the Somalia National Army (SNA) in the Gedo, Bay and Bakool regions, and will be commanded by an Ethiopian sector commander who will in turn report to the AMISOM Force Commander, Lt. General Silas Ntigurirwa. The Ethiopian addition to AMISOM will free up other units to stage a long-awaited offensive on al-Shabaab bases in the far southern regions of Lower and Middle Shebelle, with Kenyan units advancing from the south, and Uganda and Burundi pressing from the north. AMISOM has remained largely still for around a year, hampered by limited troops and air power. The al-Shabaab controlled port of Baraawe, one of the last sea access routes for the extremists, is a key target for the force.
- The local administration of Middle Shebelle region in Somalia imposes a night-time curfew in Jowhar, the regional capital. Bomb explosions and grenade attacks escalated in the town the weeks before and regional inter-clan conflicts occurred in the previous months, leading to local displacements of villagers. See also the entries of January 1 and 6.

=== January 26 ===
- Sahal Iskudhuq, a senior al-Shabaab commander and confidant of the militant group's spiritual leader, is killed between Barawe and Sablale in Somalia's southern Lower Shabelle region. Abu Mohamed, a leader within the insurgent outfit, indicates that Iskudhuq and his driver died when the vehicle they were in was struck by a drone missile. Mohamed blames U.S. authorities for the attack, with two American military officials later in the day confirming the missile strike. However, the representatives do not specify the target of the operation, and one of the officials indicates that U.S. intelligence was still ascertaining just how efficacious the strike had been. Somalia's presidential office concurrently issues a press statement welcoming the drone attack by its U.S. partner. Prime Minister Abdiweli Sheikh Ahmed also suggests via Twitter that the missile strike would serve as an effective deterrent against the arrival of additional jihadists, and would impede attempts by the militants to impose a blockade locally.

== February ==
=== February 5 ===
- Somali military forces assisted by AMISOM troops move into new areas in Lower Shabeelle. According to the regional governor Abdulkadir Mohamed Nur, government forces dislodged al-Shabaab militants from Jilib, Dhanane and Gendershe vicinities. The offensive is part of a martial clean-up operation prepared over the previous three days, which saw federal troops secure Merca's outskirts, including a main road linking the city to the capital. Nur indicates that two government soldiers were wounded during the activities, with a search operation underway to capture any remaining al-Shabaab insurgents.

=== February 7 ===
- Somali government forces from the Jubba region supported by AMISOM troops launch a surprise attack on an al-Shabaab outpost in Hagar, a town situated 50 km north of Afmadow. The joint forces dismantle the insurgent base during the operation, with seven militants reportedly killed. The troops also recover an assortment of ammunitions, one Suzuki escudo vehicle, and some communications equipment.

=== February 15 ===
- Al-Shabaab militants reportedly vacate Hudur in the southwestern Bakool region ahead of a joint assault by Somali government forces and AMISOM troops. According to residents, heavily armed insurgent fighters and commanders fled the strategic town in the morning. Al-Shabaab members also instructed local residents to leave the town as Ethiopian forces are invading.

=== February 21 ===
- Al-Shabaab militants launch a surprise attack on Villa Somalia, when a car loaded with heavy explosives rammed into the concrete barrier surrounding the perimeter of the palace. A group of nine armed men penetrate the area where the first bomb hit. All of the attackers were carrying suicide vests and fought a lengthy gun-battle with presidential guards inside the compound. The assault ended when Somali government troops and AMISOM forces reinforced presidential guards in retaking several key buildings. President Hassan Sheikh Mohamud is unharmed. Government casualties are estimated at five palace guards killed, including the deputy intelligence chief Mohamed Nur Shirbow and Mohamed Abdulle, a close aide to the prime minister. All nine of the attackers were later found and confirmed dead.

== March ==
=== March 6 ===
- Somali forces and their Ethiopian AMISOM allies capture Rabdhure in the southwestern Bakool region, a key al-Shabaab stronghold. Witnesses report the arrival in the town of Ethiopian infantrymen and battle tanks, as residents vacate their households ahead of the allied offensive. According to Somali federal government officials, dozens of al-Shabaab insurgents are killed in the ensuing battle, with early reports putting the figure at 12 dead militants. Casualty figures for the Somali army soldiers and AMISOM troops are as yet unconfirmed. The insurgent group had previously used the town and its environs as a base from which to launch attacks. Additionally, an al-Shabaab spokesman confirms that an intense battle for control of Rabhure took place, but does not elaborate on the seizure of the town. He also asserts that the militants managed to fight off an attack on their bases. The allied forces continue their march toward Hudur.
- Somali government forces and allied Ethiopian troops clash with al-Shabaab insurgents in the village of Teed, situated around 30 km from Hudur. According to the Bakool regional administration, 12 fighters on both sides are confirmed dead.

=== March 7 ===
- Somali government forces assisted by Ethiopian troops capture Hudur, the capital of the southern Bakool province, from al-Shabaab militants. The insurgent group had seized control of the town about a year earlier, following a surprise withdrawal by Ethiopian troops. Hudur since that time served as the militant outfit's largest remaining stronghold. Additionally, AMISOM confirms on Twitter that the allied forces have seized the town. According to AMISOM spokesman Colonel Ali Aden Houmed, the al-Shabaab militants retreated after attempting to engage the allied forces, with three Somali army soldiers incurring minor injuries and no AMISOM casualties. Hudur's Mayor Mohamed Moallim Ahmed also announces that Somali soldiers and Ethiopian AMISOM troops are conducting door-to-door investigations in a joint security operation, with a number of suspects apprehended.

=== March 9 ===
- Somali government forces assisted by an Ethiopian battalion with AMISOM captured Wajid District in the southern Bakool province. According to the district Governor Abdullahi Yarisow, the siege took a few hours and local residents welcomed the allied forces. He did not specify any casualties.
- Somali government troops assisted by AMISOM soldiers engage al-Shabaab militants in a gun battle on the outskirts of Burdhubo in the southern Gedo province. It is the second largest of the remaining towns in the region that are under al-Shabaab control. According to a senior Somali military officer stationed in the province, Col. Abdi Bule Abdi, the allied forces captured three of the insurgents during the operation. The official also indicates that they killed at least six other fighters, but declines to comment on casualties by the joint Somali and AMISOM troops. The militant commanders and their fighters subsequently begin vacating the town proper as the allied forces draw near. Many civilians had already fled the area ahead of the offensive, which Gedo Governor Mohamed Abdi Kali attributes to coercion by the insurgents. Kalil adds that the allied forces are positioned around 2 km from Burdhubo and are prepared to enter it within a few hours. According to the Governor, the Somali and AMISOM troops will then march toward Bardera, al-Shabaab's largest remaining stronghold and a place of residence of several of its senior commanders. Within a few hours, the allied forces capture Burdhubo.

=== March 10 ===
- Somali government forces assisted by AMISOM troops engage in a gun battle with al-Shabaab militants on the outskirts of Barawe and Qoryoley. The allied forces moved into the insurgent group's bases in the southern Lower Shabelle region during the early part of the day, subsequently encountering heavy resistance by the militants. According to the Lower Shabelle region Governor Abdikadir Mohamed Nur Siidi, two Somali soldiers and two AMISOM troops have sustained injuries during the clash. At least four persons are also reportedly killed, including one civilian. The offensive is part of an intensified military operation by the allied forces to remove al-Shabaab from the remaining areas in southern Somalia under its control.

=== March 11 ===
- Somali federal government troops and Kenyan Defence Forces under AMISOM launch an assault on an al-Shabaab base in Taraakoo, situated around 55 km east of Bardhere. Almost 10 battlewagons specifically designed to carry very heavy weaponry have also reportedly departed early in the morning from their military base in Faafax-Dhuun and are headed towards Taraakoo. No casualties are reported during the Taraakoo raid.

=== March 12 ===
- Kenyan fighter jets bombard an al-Shabaab base in Bardera, situated in the southwestern Gedo region. The airstrike also destroys several military vehicles belonging to the group. At least 32 militants are killed and 10 others injured during the bombardment.

=== March 13 ===
- Somali army forces backed by AMISOM troops capture Bulobarte from al-Shabaab. Situated in the Hiran region, the town was the insurgent group's strongest base in central Somalia. According to the tenth Somali national army contingent commissioner, Colonel Mohamed Ammin, the militants vacated Bulobarte thereby allowing the allied forces to seize control of the area. He adds that Somali government soldiers and AMISOM forces are now headed toward the other parts of the region under insurgent control, with the joint troops expecting to remove the militants altogether from Hiran over the next few days. Additionally, the allied forces seize control of Buqdaaqable; the insurgents mount no resistance. The town is located around 90 km from Beledweyne, Hiran's capital. The Somali army forces and AMISOM troops also capture the towns of Weel Dheyn and Ted in the Bay and Bakool regions in Sector 3.

=== March 15 ===
- The U.S. Department of State begins offering bounties of up to $3 million apiece for information leading to the arrest or conviction of the al-Shabaab senior members Abdikadir Mohamed Abdikadir, Yasin Kilwe and Jafar. According to State Department officials, Abdikadir coordinates al-Shabaab's recruitment activities in Kenya, with Jafar acting as his deputy; Kilwe serves as al-Shabaab Emir for the northeastern Puntland region. The bounties are part of the "Rewards for Justice" program, wherein money is issued for leads on terror suspects.

=== March 16 ===
- Somali military forces assisted by AMISOM troops capture Warsheikh from al-Shabaab. Situated around 90 km north of Mogadishu in the Middle Shabelle region, the coastal town served as one of the insurgent group's main bases. The militants mount no resistance during the siege, which is part of the federal government's broader "Somalia unity operation".

=== March 17 ===
- The commander of Puntland military units stationed in Galgala, Col. Jama Saed Warsame (Afgadud), is killed in an al-Shabaab ambush near Bosaso. Reports initially suggest that he was targeted by an Improvised Explosive Device (IED) planted on the main road between Bosaso and Laag village, situated around 27 km away. However, independent sources later indicate that al-Shabaab gunmen opened fire on the armored vehicle in which Warsame was traveling, in the process wounding the commander and one of his bodyguards and killing another member of his security detail. Warsame subsequently succumbed to heavy upper body injuries at the Bosaso General Hospital. Puntland officials have not publicly commented on the ambush. On a pro-Al-Shabaab radio station, Sheikh Ali Dheere, a spokesman for the insurgent group, claims responsibility for the attack.

=== March 18 ===
- Al-Shabaab militants attack the Hotel Amalo in Buloburde, where Somali military officials and AMISOM commanders are staying. The insurgents are dressed in army fatigues, and begin the assault with a car bomb followed by heavy gunfire on pre-planned positions inside the downtown establishment. A shootout with bodyguards ensues, with at least 25 people reportedly killed. According to security sources, many al-Shabaab fighters are slain over the three-hour clash, while other militants manage to escape from the scene. Allied casualties include the Buloburde Mayor Abdulkadir Nour, former Hiran region Governor Yusuf Ahmed Hagar (Dabo Geed), military commander Col. Mohamed Adan Amin and his deputy. Individuals who sustained injuries are flown out to the Halane and Madina Hospital in Mogadishu for medical treatment.

=== March 22 ===
- Somali government forces and AMISOM troops attack al-Shabaab bases in the Lower Shabelle region. Dozens of residents flee Qoryoley, as the joint forces march towards the town. Fighting erupts as the militants attempt to resist the allied forces, who have already captured from al-Shabaab over six main districts in the southern Bay, Bakool, Gedo and Hiran regions. Additionally, Interior Minister Abdullahi Godah Barre pledges to liberate additional towns from the insurgent group over the next few days. He also indicates that the government is prepared to assist low profile al-Shabaab fighters who renounce violence and hand over their weapons. However, Barre vows to offer no amnesty to the militant group's senior commanders, whom he instead states will be commensurately prosecuted under the law.
- Somali military forces assisted by AMISOM troops capture Qoryoley after intensive fighting with al-Shabaab militants. According to residents, at least four civilians are killed during the heavy gun battle after a mortar shell strikes their house. The town harbored a number of the insurgent group's commanders, who had fled there over the course of the month's intensified military operations against them. Seizure of Qoryoley facilitates the allied forces' plans to capture the port city of Barawe, which serves as one of al-Shabaab's last remaining revenue bases. The joint operations by the Somali army and AMISOM troops have liberated eight towns within the month, including most recently Qurunlow in the Middle Shabelle province. UN Special Representative for Somalia Nicholas Kay describes the offensive as "the most significant and geographically extensive military advance" since AU troops began operations in 2007.

=== March 23 ===
- Al-Shabaab militants launch a midnight attack on Somali military and AMISOM troop bases in Janale, situated a few kilometers from Qoryoley. The allied forces respond with heavy gunfire, repelling the assault. Casualties sustained during the ambush are uncertain. According to a local resident, the situation in the town is under control and security operations there are underway.
- Eight traditional elders are gunned down near Burhakaba, while returning to their homes in Lower Shabelle after elections for the disputed Southwestern State of Somalia. One of the elders is also believed to have been taken by unknown gunmen. Prime Minister Abdiweli Sheikh Ahmed subsequently releases a statement condemning the assassinations, sending condolences to the families of the slain elders, and indicating that the government will launch an investigation into the murders. Both Ahmed and the Bay province's police commissioner blame al-Shabaab militants for the attack. However, an official from the insurgent group denies responsibility for or involvement in the incident.

=== March 25 ===
- Somali military troops and Ethiopian forces clash with al-Shabaab militants in El-Qohle village to the south of Dhusamareb, the Galguduud province's capital. According to Somali National Army commanders, the insurgents launched the ambush ahead of the allied forces' march toward El Buur, situated 377 km north of Mogadishu. The town serves as the militant group's largest remaining stronghold in central Somalia. Around 10 individuals on both sides are reported dead during the El-Qohle gunfight. Witnesses indicate that the security situation in the village has returned to normal, as the joint forces have seized control of the area.
- Somali National Army and AMISOM troops capture Mahas district from al-Shabaab. It is the fourth area in the Hiran province that the allied forces have liberated, with Jalalaqsi the only remaining district in Hiran that is under insurgent control.

=== March 26 ===
- Somali government forces and Ethiopian AMISOM soldiers capture El Buur in the Galguduud region. Al-Shabaab insurgents reportedly leave the town before the joint troops enter it. According to residents, the allied forces' arrival follows five days of intensive fighting with the militants in the surrounding areas. Heavy shelling is also reported on El Buur's outer perimeter. The town represents the tenth city seized by the joint forces within the month.

=== March 29 ===
- Somali national troops and AMISOM forces capture Maqokori village in the Hiran province. Al-Shabaab militants do not mount any resistance, and no casualties are reported. The local security situation is also reportedly calm.
- Al-Shabaab militants attack Somali national army and AMISOM positions in Gondershe. A pro-Al-Shabaab website asserts that the insurgents have entered the village; the allied forces rebuff the claim and indicate that they managed to repel the assault. Local residents confirm hearing mortar shelling and gunfire during the night. No casualties are reported.

== April ==
=== April 2 ===
- Somali army commander Ali Matan Ali indicates that Ethiopian AMISOM troops have reached the southern town of Garbaharey. According to the military leader, the Somali National Army and AMISOM are slated to advance from there to liberate other areas in the Gedo province including Bardera, an al-Shabaab bastion.

=== April 5 ===
- Somalia government forces backed by the Ethiopian army of the African Union Forces in Bakool region attacked bases of the militant combatants of al-Shabaab in Bar village near Wajid where the Al Shabaab fighters set up their bases and used to continue a ban against the liberated towns in the south and central regions. The casualties of the fight was not also known.

=== April 6 ===
- Somali government army backed by the African Union Forces in Somalia seized Wobxo from Al Shabaab fighters. The security forces started to clear mines and explosives left by the militants in the town. Al Shabaab claimed to have killed Somali and Ethiopia soldiers in the battle. While denied by the authorities, photos posted on social media showed Al Shabaab fighters in a nearby village posing with two unidentified bodies with African Unions patches, military uniforms, Ethiopian script, helmets, and several weapons. The locals said that the combatants of Al Shabab fled to the nearby villages as the joint forces entered the strategic town in central Somalia on Sunday.

=== April 9 ===
- Al Shabaab fighters launch a night raid in El Buur with an opening salvo from mortars. Somali forces and Ethiopian troops from AMISOM repel the assault with heavy weaponry. Both sides have stayed quiet over the issue and casualty numbers are unknown.

=== April 13 ===
- Al-Shabaab militants attack trucks transporting rations for Ethiopian troops on the road linking Wajid and Yeed. An intense gunfight ensues between Somali government forces and Ethiopian soldiers versus the insurgents. According to a Somali military commander, the battle lasts five hours and allied troops that are guarding the rations receive reinforcements from battalions stationed nearby. Buur Dhuhule is among the impacted areas. At least 11 individuals are slain in the faceoff, with the commander asserting that the joint forces killed dozens of militants and dispersed the others. Bakool residents report that hundreds of allied soldiers traveling in armored fighting vehicles are now pursuing the al-Shabaab fighters in the province.

=== April 17 ===
- Al-Shabaab fighters launch an attack on Somali government troops traveling in armored vehicles on the main road to Burhakaba. According to witnesses, a heavy gunfight ensues leaving six insurgents and four soldiers. Al-Shabaab reportedly use rocket propelled grenades during the assault. Somali government forces assisted by AMISOM troops manage to repel the militants, driving them into the forest. Baidoa General Hospital officials confirm that four government soldiers have been transferred to the facility, with injured parties receiving medical treatment. A Somali National Army spokesman indicates that the militants often attack government troops along the Baidoa-Burhakaba highway. Al-Shabaab do not comment on the incident.

=== April 21 ===
- Isaak Mohammed, a member of parliament in Mogadishu, is killed by a bomb hidden in his car. The explosion leaves another lawmaker seriously wounded. Al-Shabaab claims responsibility for the blast, saying the killing was meant to punish politicians who backed the "invasion of Christians into Somalia", a reference to AMISOM.
- Heavily armed al-Shabaab fighters seize a key military base in Daynuunay village about 20 kilometers from Baidoa along the road to Mogadishu, after the Somali military withdrew from the area and moved toward the town of Burhakaba. Hundreds of militants also enter Abu Asharow village, situated around 5 kilometers from Baidoa, according to eyewitnesses.

=== April 22 ===
- Abdiaziz Isaak Mursal, a member of parliament in Mogadishu, is shot and killed by unidentified gunmen. Al-Shabaab claims responsibility for the murder.
- President of Burundi Pierre Nkurunziza visits Mogadishu and addresses AMISOM troops.

=== April 23 ===
- Al-Shabaab spokesman Ali Mohamed Rage (Ali Dhere) indicates that his group is responsible for the killing of two MPs in Mogadishu during the week. He also vows to keep targeting politicians in retaliation for bringing AMISOM to Somalia. Additionally, Prime Minister Abdiweli Sheikh Ahmed and Speaker of Parliament Mohamed Osman Jawari pledge that terrorist threats and attacks will not derail the ongoing post-conflict reconstruction process, with Ahmed indicating that security officials are in pursuit of the attackers.
- Somali government forces assisted by AMISOM troops capture Eyn from al-Shabaab. The village is situated 36 km northeast of Buloburde in the Hiran province. According to a government officer, the militants abandoned their bases following the allied forces' offensive. Two of the insurgents are reportedly slain in the assault, with others wounded. The officer adds that Eyn previously served as the outfit's main base in the area from which it would launch attacks. He also indicates that government forces will establish new army bases in the region so as to fortify local security.
- Somali government forces launch a nighttime raid on an al-Shabaab hideout in Mooro Gaabey, a town situated 30 km from the Bakool region's capital Hudur. According to Hudur Mayor Mohamed Moallim, the army operation was facilitated by intelligence briefings. The military succeeds in its plan, killing and wounding two senior al-Shabaab commanders, Abdullahi Abukar Ali and Ahmed Mohamed Qeyra. Ali had previously served as the insurgent group's local police chief. Moallim also vows more raids against the militants. Al-Shabaab does not comment on the incident.

=== April 28 ===
- Somali National Army commander Mohamed Osman Tima'adde announces that government forces have captured Kulan-Jareer in the Bakool region from al-Shabaab. The area is situated around 45 km from the Wajid provincial district. According to Tima'adde, the government forces launched the assault after having received intelligence briefings indicating that the al-Shabaab Bay region representative Abdullahi Dhere was in Kulan-Jareer. The commander also asserts that the federal troops killed five of Dhere's 30 bodyguards during the raid.

== May ==
=== May 3 ===
- MP Abdullahi Ahmed Hussein ("Oonka") is targeted by a car bomb in Mogadishu's Hamarweyne district. The explosives were strapped to his vehicle near the Marwas mosque. Hussein is unharmed, and indicates that he was tipped off by the hotel's sentry, who told him that some youngsters were suspiciously loitering around the area where the legislator's vehicle was parked. Hamarweyne District Commissioner Abdulkadir Mohamed Abdulkadir also credits security personnel for aborting the assassination attempt.
- Former secretary of the Banadir regional administration Abdikafi Hilowle Osman is killed in a suicide bombing after an explosive-laden car strikes his minivan at the KM4 junction in Mogadishu. According to police officer Mohammed Duale, at least seven people are killed during the blast, including four civilians and three policemen. Another security official indicates that the bomb was planted beside the road. Al-Shabaab claims responsibility for the attack.
- Governor of the Gedo region Mohamed Abdi Kilil is targeted by a bomb in Beled Hawo. Two of his bodyguards are killed in the assault, but Kilil survives. The Deputy Mayor of the Buur Dhuubo district is also reportedly targeted with a roadside bomb in the town. No group claims responsibility for the attacks.

=== May 4 ===
- According to Qoryooley Mayor Abdishakur Adan Dhegay, Somali Federal Government forces repel an attack by al-Shabaab militants in Qoryoley. The insurgents fired mortar shells at military bases, and a one-hour gun battle soon followed between soldiers guarding the area and the al-Shabaab fighters. No casualties are reported.

=== May 10 ===
- The allied forces have completed the first phase of the liberation campaign, although not all targets have been met. President Mohamud indicates that al-Shabaab is attempting to turn residents in the newly liberated areas against the government by blocking the movement of goods and relief supplies. As a workaround, he notes that the federal government's international partners have pledged to airlift basic supplies to the regions. Mohamud also indicates that although al-Shabaab still controls a significant proportion of rural areas, the federal government has managed to seize control of nine towns in six different regions, which are home to roughly three million people. During the first High Level Partnership Forum Executive Meeting on Somalia's New Deal Compact in Mogadishu, which Mohamud chaired, he likewise notes the many other goals that the central government has achieved, including the establishment of development assistance support structures as well as the launching of flagship projects in several liberated towns.

=== May 12 ===
- Eyewitnesses report that a suicide car bomber in Baydhaba strikes a vehicle transporting the former Bay province Governor and incumbent Minister of the Southwestern Somalia regional administration Abdifatah Ibrahim Gesey. At least 19 people die in the ensuing blast, including pedestrians, store owners, and almost 10 of Gesey's bodyguards. A number of people are also injured. However, Gesey survives the explosion, condemns the attack, and suggests that he was targeted for assassination. Al-Shabaab immediately claims responsibility for the assault through an official statement published on its jihadi websites. Security officials indicate that they have launched an investigation to identify the driver of the bomb-carrying vehicle and will announce their findings shortly. The situation in the town is reportedly calm by the afternoon.

=== May 17 ===
- Buurdhuubo Mayor Hassan Mohamed Abdi announces that Somali government fores have launched an offensive on the remaining al-Shabaab bastions in the Gedo province. The insurgents had previously imposed a blockade on the town after a military operation by government and AMISOM troops. According to Abdi, the militants fled the area as the allied forces approached.

=== May 18 ===
- Commander-In-Chief of the Somali National Army General Dahir Adan Elmi (Indho Qarsho) declares that 17 al-Shabaab fighters have been killed following illegal roadblock clearance operations by government soldiers in the Lower Shabelle region. He indicates that 300 troops and six armored fighting vehicles were sent to the province after uniformed militiamen had been extorting money from trucks traveling along the road between Mogadishu and Lower Shabelle. Indho Qarsho also asserts that seven on duty soldiers were killed and 15 other were injured during illegal roadblock clearance operations between Warmaxan and Afgooye over the past few months. Additionally, he indicates that similar operations are underway to secure the Marka-Mogadishu route.
- Eyewitnesses report that Kenyan warplanes have bombed two al-Shabaab military bases in Maanyo, situated 15 km west of the Jilib district in the Middle Jubba province. The Kenya Defence Forces spokesman Emmanuel Chirchir confirms the aerial offensive over Twitter. The eyewitnesses add that two al-Shabaab vehicles were destroyed during the assault. Local reports also indicate that some of the militant group's commanders were in the area during the bombardment. While some injuries and deaths were reported, no precise casualty figures have been confirmed.

=== May 19 ===
- Former Deputy District Commissioner of the Hamarjajab district in Mogadishu Farah Dahir Jimale is targeted by a bomb planted inside his vehicle. The incident occurred a few hours after a hit-and-run attack on the former District Commissioner of the Heliwa district as he was driving along the San'a junction. The erstwhile Heliwa DC survives the attack, while Jimale is critically wounded. He is rushed to the hospital before eventually succumbing to his injuries. Both commissioners of the Hamarjajab and Hamarweine districts blame al-Shabaab for the attack, although no group claims responsibility for it. Col. Dahir Mohamud of the Hamarweine police also suggests that the blast bears the hallmarks of the insurgent group, and indicates that security forces are investigating the incident.
- Somali government forces and AMISOM troops fight against al-Shabaab militants in Xero-2-aad, situated around 3 km from Qoryoley in the Lower Shabelle region. According to witnesses, the battle lasts at least a few hours. The government soldiers eventually manage to capture the town. Additionally, Lower Shabelle region government representative Ganey Abdi Barre indicates that Sheikh Abdirashid Baka, a senior al-Shabaab official, is killed during the gunfight.

=== May 24 ===
- Al-Shabaab militants traveling in a Vehicle Borne Improvised Explosive Device (VBIED) attempt to trespass the entrance to the parliamentary compound in Mogadishu. After the VBIED explodes, the uniformed gunmen in it enter an unoccupied portion of the building. They are immediately counter-attacked by Somali National Army soldiers assisted by AMISOM security personnel, who have been deployed to the area. The ensuing gunfight lasts five hours. All legislators are in the meantime safely evacuated from the premises. Three MPs, Omar Mohamed Finish, Abdalla Boos and Mohamed Moallim, sustain minor injuries from the blast and are taken to local hospitals for treatment. Medical teams are also dispatched onto the scene, and other wounded parties, most of whom are security guards, are receiving treatment at the AMISOM hospital. All of the attackers are killed. Prime Minister Abdiweli Sheikh Ahmed shortly afterwards visits the compound, and suggests that the allied forces should mount a rapid counter-attack on al-Shabaab's planning bases. Additionally, UN Envoy to Somalia Ambassador Nicholas Kay condemns the attack, felicitates the joint forces for their quick response, and reaffirms the UN's support for the Somali authorities' peace and stabilization efforts. Ambassador Mahamat Saleh Annadif, the Special Representative of the Chairperson of the African Union Commission for Somalia (SRCC), also commends the allied forces, sends his condolences to the families and friends of the casualties, and highlights the futility of al-Shabaab's terrorist activities. Speaker of the Federal Parliament Mohamed Osman Jawari likewise vows that the attack will only serve to strengthen the resolve of the allied forces, and indicates that security forces are already investigating the incident.

=== May 31 ===
- Somali National Army soldiers and AMISOM troops launch a morning raid on Ceel-Waare and Dhabadey, two towns situated about 18 km from Buloburte on the main road from Beledweyne. According to SNA Colonel Mohamed Ali, the allied forces have liberated the villages from al-Shabaab, confiscated three rifles from the militants, and killed a number of insurgents while others fled ahead of the offensive. The joint forces have in the process freed a dozen civilian-owned trucks carrying commercial goods to Buloburte, one of several supply routes in the region that al-Shabaab had attempted to block.

== June ==
=== June 1 ===
- Somali government forces and Ethiopian troops launch an attack on al-Shabaab bases near the southwestern town of Ato. According to the Bakool province's Deputy Governor Hassan Ibrahim Lugbur, over 74 insurgents are killed in the ensuing battle. He adds that the raid is likely in retaliation for ambushes launched by the militants on allied bases the week prior. The joint forces also incur significant casualties during the Ato clash, but claim victory.

=== June 5 ===
- Somali federal government forces backed by AMISOM troops have recaptured Rabdhure district and several surrounding areas in Bakol region in their recent offensive against Al Shabaab militants. Bakol Governor, Mohamed Abdi Tol has confirmed the capture of Rabdhure, Lahelow, Garas-weyne and several others villages in the region by the allied forces. Tol further stated that the allied forces seized all the above-mentioned areas in recent armed clashes against Al Shabaab militant group.

=== June 9 ===
- Rival clan militias engage in a gunfight in Merca, the capital of Lower Shabelle. Garowe Online initially reports that the rival fighters belong to the fifth and sixth brigade of the national army. However, Raxanreeb later clarifies that the fighters are militiamen dressed in the uniform of the Somali armed forces and that they entered the town in battle-wagons. It also indicates that the skirmish is part of a series of recent clashes in the region over ownership of land and farms. Businesses are forced to remain closed, and the armed fighters reportedly also target civilian residences. Additionally, reports suggest that the local residents and the municipal administration fled, though Merca Mayor Mohamed Osman Yarisow denies any pullout. Prime Minister Abdiweli Sheikh Ali calls for calm and urges the feuding groups to cease hostilities. The central government shortly afterwards deploys a reconciliation team to Merca to mediate between the militias. The delegation is led by Minister of Interior and Federal Affairs Abdullahi Godax Barre, and also includes several legislators and elders.

=== June 15 ===
- Ethiopian forces reportedly crossed into Somalia border as tensions between Al Shabab militant group in Somalia and the Somali National Army backed by the African Union Forces is on the rise in Bakol region, southern Somalia. Residents in Qura’ Jome district on the border with Ethiopia confirmed that today more troops from Ethiopia reached the town and have stationed near the district. According to Bakol regional administration, the troops are part of the Ethiopian contingent of the African Union Mission in Somalia known as AMISOM to tackle against the militant groups and to help the troops of Somalia retake all the regions and the districts of the southern part of the nation. Meanwhile, sources in Bakol said, the Al Qaeda linked group of al-Shabaab commenced to get reinforcement of militias and battle wagons on the locations they control in the region.

=== June 25 ===
- AMISOM forces have conducted airstrikes in Anole and Kuday in the Lower Jubba region as part of a sustained effort to destroy al-Shabaab's military capabilities. The airstrikes in Anole left more than 30 al-Shabaab fighters dead, 3 technical vehicles and one Land Cruiser loaded with ammunition destroyed. In Kuday, the airstrike killed more than 50 insurgents. AMISOM continues to up the pressure on al-Shabaab with a view to liberating more areas in forthcoming operations.

=== June 26 ===
- Militants from al-Shabaab launched an attack on the town of Bulo-burde, which has been besieged by militants and cut off from road access since it came under government control in March. Witnesses say that the attack lasted thirty minutes and began when militants stormed a military base established in a hotel complex before they were driven back by the combined force of the SNA and AMISOM. Al-Shabaab claimed responsibility and claimed to have killed six soldiers while the AU commander, Ibrahim Ali, stated that two Djiboutian peacekeepers, one civilian, and two militants were killed.

== July ==
=== July 8 ===
- Al-Shabaab militants attempt to breach the gated perimeter of the Villa Somalia presidential compound in Mogadishu with a car bomb. At a joint press conference on the abortive terrorist attack, Information Minister Mustafa Dhuhulow indicates that government soldiers assisted by AMISOM troops managed to repel the raid, with no public officials injured. He adds that security forces killed three of the insurgents in the car park during the Iftar assault, while the fourth was taken into custody. Bomb disposal specialists also reportedly managed to deactivate a suicide vest that one of the attackers had on, which had failed to go off, in addition to several other explosive devices. Dhuhulow likewise states that a thorough investigation into the attack would be launched. Al-Shabaab spokesman Sheikh Abdiasis Abu Musab claims that the militant group's fighters killed 14 soldiers during the raid. Additionally, police Colonel Abdullahi Aden indicates that there was an earlier gunfight near an underground cell holding insurgents. Residents also report hearing intermittent bursts of gunfire into the night. Dhuhulow indicates that chief of intelligence Bashir Gobe and police commander Abdihakim Saaid have been immediately replaced. As part of a broader security reform, Prime Minister Abdiweli Sheikh Ahmed also announces that a new national security minister has been named. Speaking from Villa Somalia, President Hassan Sheikh Mohamud, who was at another location at the time of the attack, dispels as wild rumours suggestions that the insurgents controlled state buildings and of ongoing gunfights. He confirms that state forces assisted by AMISOM troops have secured the compound, and urges the citizenry to work with the government to further strengthen security.

=== July 13 ===
- Somali national security forces assisted by AMISOM troops capture Saydhelow and Labatan from al-Shabaab. The two villages are situated around 60 km from the Bay region center of Baidoa. According to the Berdaale district governor Mohamed Issack (Caracase), fatalities vis-a-vis the insurgents are unreported, while two government soldiers were wounded during the gunfight. He also indicates that the allied forces seized several armed vehicles from the militants.

== August ==
=== August 4 ===
- An al-Shabaab militant wearing a suicide vest blows himself up at the Bari region police compound in Bosaso, killing the provincial police commander Abdirahman Ali Abaas. The inland revenue head Mohamud Haji Saleban and two of his security guards, who were standing nearby, also died in the explosion.

=== August 10 ===
- National Security Minister Mohammed Yusuf announces that government security forces have shot and killed al-Shabaab commander Nur Baraxow. The troops were conducting a security operation in Mogadishu to apprehend the militant leader, after having received intelligence from the public on his hideout in the SOS Kivu neighborhood. According to Yusuf, Baraxow subsequently resisted arrest, engaging the security forces in a gunfight during which he was killed.

=== August 15 ===
- As part of a Federal Government operation to disarm militias operating in Mogadishu, Somali national security forces assisted by AMISOM police and military launch a security operation in Mogadishu's Wadajir district. In search of illegal weapons, the allied forces raid a house belonging to faction leader and former Wadajir District Commissioner Ahmed Hassan Addow "Daaci". Government security official Mohamed Yusuf indicates that Addow's militiamen subsequently confronted the allied forces. Witnesses report at least five fatalities, including three civilian deaths, in the ensuing gunfight. The joint forces also search another house belonging to Abdullahi Sheikh Hassan, a local politician and former faction leader. Main roads were blocked off during the operation.

=== August 16 ===
- Hiraan region Governor Abdifatah Hassan Afrah indicates that Somali government forces assisted by AMISOM troops have liberated a number of towns in the region from the al-Shabaab militants. Among the captured local areas are Abesale, Badi Keen, Buuq Goosaar, El Ade and Far Libah.

=== August 17 ===
- Somali national army forces assisted by AMISOM troops begin a major military operation against al-Shabaab in central Somalia. The move comes 24 hours after the national chief of military announced the start of new offensives against the insurgent group. Hiran Governor Abdifatah Hassan indicates that the allied forces are slated to liberate the remaining parts of the province that are under militant control, and in the process remove roadblocks that the insurgents erected. An RBC Radio correspondent in Beledweyne also reports that the allied forces have left Buloburte in Hiran and are heading toward Burane in the Middle Shabelle province. Additionally, Hassan indicates that AMISOM's Ethiopian contingent left Elbur in the Galgadud province and are bound for al-Shabaab controlled areas.

=== August 25 ===
- Somali government forces assisted by Ethiopian AMISOM troops capture Tiyeglow from al-Shabaab. The offensive is part of a larger military cleanup operation dubbed Operation Indian Ocean. Situated around 530 km northeast of Mogadishu along the main road linking Beledweyne and Baidoa, Tiyeglow previously served as a strategic base for the insurgent group. Witnesses indicate that the al-Shabaab fighters mounted no resistance during the raid, fleeing instead to adjacent forested areas. According to AMISOM, the successful military operation deprives the insurgent group of high extortion fees that it would previously charge to vehicles traveling along the town's principal road. The siege also now gives the Somali government full control of the Bakool province. Additionally, AMISOM representatives indicate that, in an attempt to slow the allied forces' march, the insurgents planted roadside explosive devices before fleeing, which they were presently defusing.

=== August 30 ===
- General Abdirizak Khalif Elmi, frontline armed forces commander-in-chief, announces that Somali government forces assisted by AMISOM troops have seized Bulo Marer in the Lower Shabelle province from al-Shabaab. Located between 115 km to 120 km south of Mogadishu, the town previously served as a strategic base and tax collection center for the insurgent group, from which it would launch attacks on other areas. According to witnesses, the militants mounted a heavy armed resistance, with the battle for control of the town lasting several hours. The joint allied forces also captured Goolweyn and Jerlio before heading to Bulo Marer. Government and AMISOM forces are now marching toward the port city of Barawe, al-Shabaab's last major stronghold in the province. The militants reportedly already transported radio broadcasting equipment for the purpose.
- Hiran Governor Abdifatah Hassan announces that the Somali National Army assisted by Djiboutian AMISOM forces are securing adjacent areas before entering Jalalaqsi in the Hiran province. Al-Shabaab militants had vacated the town the day before ahead of the allied forces' march.

=== August 31 ===
- Heavily armed al-Shabaab militants attack the Godka Jilacow prison in Mogadishu, a key interrogation center run by the National Intelligence and Security Agency. The raid is an apparent attempt to free other insurgents held at the facility. It begins when a vehicle carrying explosives detonates at the prison gates, with militants armed with guns and grenades then attempting to penetrate the compound. According to Somali police Capt. Mohamed Hussein, prison guards manage to repel the attack, killing all of the attackers. Witnesses also report that no prisoners have escaped. Ministry of National Security spokesman Mohamed Yusuf Osman indicates that seven al-Shabaab fighters, three security guards and one civilian were killed during the gunfight. Al-Shabaab later claims responsibility for the attack.
- Somali government forces assisted by AMISOM soldiers begin a military offensive against al-Shabaab insurgents in the Middle Shabelle province. According to regional Governor Ali Mohamud Gudlawe, the march is part of a larger, nationwide security cleanup operation to remove the militants from their remaining bastions. The joint forces are reportedly heading from Mahaday to villages situated near the local river, with residents indicating that an allied convoy is making its way toward the principal corridor adjoining the Hiran province. Al-Shabaab spokesman Sheikh Abdiasis Abu Mus’ab states that his group will try to halt the government and AMISOM forces' advance by laying siege to towns that the allied forces have liberated. President Hassan Sheikh Mohamud a few hours later orders a full public inquiry into the attack.
- Somali government forces assisted by AMISOM troops capture Fidow in Middle Shabelle from al-Shabaab. It is situated 60 km from the provincial capital Jowhar. The militants reportedly vacated the village ahead of the raid.
- Somali government forces and AMISOM troops seize Kurtunwaarey in Lower Shabelle from al-Shabaab. It is situated 20 km west of the Bulo Marer district. The militants reportedly vacated the town before the arrival of the allied forces.

== September ==
=== September 1 ===
- Arriving from the Middle Shabelle regional capital of Jowhar, Somali government forces assisted by AMISOM troops from the Burundian contingent capture Kililka Shiinaha and Dhiin Garas from al-Shabaab. According to Somali National Army mobilizer Abdirizak Khalif Elmi, the allied forces are now heading toward Jalalaqsi. Lower Shabelle Governor Abdulkadir Mohamed Nur Siidi also indicates that the joint forces will lay siege to the al-Shabaab bastions of Saakow and Bu'ale in the Middle Jubba province.
- U.S. military forces conduct an operation against al-Shabaab in southern Somalia. Pentagon Press Secretary Rear Adm. John Kirby indicates that they are still assessing the raid's impact. Masked militants subsequently begin mass arrests of local residents under charges of spying. Additionally, a senior Somali intelligence official states that the U.S. drone strike was targeting the al-Shabaab leader Ahmed Abdi Godane (Moktar Ali Zubeyr) as he was leaving a gathering of the group's senior commanders. The meeting was reportedly over the ongoing joint offensive by Somali military and AMISOM forces against al-Shabaab's remaining bastions. Speaking on condition of anonymity, the official adds that the attack occurred in a forest adjacent to Sablale district, and also suggests that Godane may have been killed during the drone strike. U.S. officials later clarify that the strike was carried out via both drone and manned aircraft, with U.S. special operations forces destroying a vehicle and training camp using laser-guided munitions and Hellfire missiles. According to a U.S. government source, a Twitter account that was linked by American authorities to al-Shabaab also declared that Godane had died during the raid. While the Arabic tweet's authenticity is being analyzed, Godane does not appear in any social media or other public outlet to confirm that he is still alive. Experts suggest that his death would trigger a power struggle within the militant group to fill the leadership void, and may ultimately lead to its fragmentation.

=== September 3 ===
- Following a cabinet meeting, the federal government announces a 45-day ultimatum to al-Shabaab members to surrender, disarm and renounce violence. According to Minister of National Security Khalif Ahmed Ereg, any individual who ignores the directive will be held legally accountable. The cabinet also calls on local Islamic scholars and society members to assist in convincing young militants to leave al-Shabaab and join the peace process.
- The Hiran regional administration announces that Somali government forces assisted by AMISOM troops have driven al-Shabaab completely out of the Hiran province. The allied forces are now slated to open the road between Beledweyne and Bulobarte. Additionally, they are marching toward the remaining areas under militant control, including Barawe where a number of al-Shabaab commanders reportedly reside.

=== September 5 ===
- The Pentagon press secretariat Rear Adm. John Kirby confirms that Godane was killed in the U.S. airstrike. He describes the militant leader's death as a major symbolic and operational loss for al-Shabaab, the result of years of intelligence, military and law enforcement work. President of Somalia Hassan Sheikh Mohamud states that all of Godane's companions were also killed during the operation, which he indicates was conducted with the full knowledge and consent of the Somali federal government. He also reiterates his administration's 45-day offer of amnesty to all moderate al-Shabaab members who choose to renounce violence and disavow links with the insurgent group and its al-Qaeda affiliate. Additionally, Prime Minister of Somalia Abdiweli Sheikh Ahmed announces that the attack was targeting Godane's convoy near the town of Haawaay, and was an official joint operation between U.S. and Somali forces. He likewise asserts that the insurgent commander's death will help the reconstruction efforts in Somalia to proceed unimpeded. Abdi Aynte, Director of the Mogadishu-based Heritage Institute for Policy Studies, suggests that Godane's killing will likely mark the start of the end for al-Shabaab. The Muslim scholars association in Somalia also issues a statement welcoming the progress made by the Somali National Army and AMISOM troops to eliminate the insurgent group.

=== September 6 ===
- The Ministry of National Security of Somalia issues a public warning of possible retaliatory attacks by al-Shabaab insurgents for the killing of their leader Godane. The national security agencies are also reportedly placed on alert to respond to any threats by the militant group.
- Somali government forces assisted by AMISOM troops capture remaining villages in the Bakool region from al-Shabaab. The seized areas include Biyeeleey, Sakaaroole and War-galoole in the Tiyeglow district. According to Col. Abdullahi Mohamed Ughaz, the battle lasted several hours, with at least ten insurgents killed. Al-Shabaab does not comment on the casualties. Ugaas also indicates that the allied forces impounded vehicles and weapons belonging to the militants.
- Al-Shabaab acknowledge that its leader Ahmed Abdi Godane has been killed in a joint U.S.-Somalia operation. The militants concurrently appoint Ahmad Umar (Abu Ubaidah) as his replacement.
- Somali government forces assisted by Ethiopian troops seize El Garas in the Galguduud province from al-Shabaab. According to the Somali military spokesman Mohamed Kariye Roble, the village was a main base for the insurgent group, serving as both a springboard from which it would launch attacks and a supply storage area.

=== September 9 ===
- Hiran administration announces that new forces will be deployed in the province. They will maintain security in local areas that Somali government and AMISOM troops recently liberated from al-Shabaab. Senior Hiran administration official Mohamed Ibrahim also indicates that government forces are pursuing the perpetrators of a suicide bomb attack in the province. The explosion targeted the Jalalaqsi district commissioner, killing a prominent local elder with no group claiming responsibility.

=== September 12 ===
- Ugandan and Kenyan AMISOM forces conduct security operations in Lagta Berta in Lower Juba, where al-Shabaab had established two bases after vacating Barawe. The militant group incurs significant fatalities during the raid, including foreign insurgents, and a number of its fighters are also injured. The attack destroys the al-Shabaab hideout facility.

=== September 13 ===
- Gunmen in a small vehicle shoot at a car transporting Deputy Commander of Counter-Terrorism Colonel Mohamed Qanuuni at the KM5 Zoppe junction in Mogadishu. The armed men escape the scene before police arrive. Qanuuni dies shortly afterwards from injuries sustained during the shooting. The attack comes amid heavy cleanup operations by national security agents.
- Somali government forces and AMISOM troops capture Aboreey, Moqokori, Yasooman and Muuse-geel villages in the Bulobarte district from al-Shabaab. The militants mount no resistance.
- Somali government forces and AMISOM troops seize Abooto-barrey, Ceel-Sheel, Carraale and Kaawada villages in the Galguduud province's El Bur district from al-Shabaab.
- The French magazine Le Point reports that French intelligence services assisted the U.S. military in its airstrike that killed al-Shabaab commander Godane. According to the weekly, the French authorities, including President François Hollande, provided support in the form of intelligence and coordination. Among other information, French intelligence officials reportedly forwarded to the Pentagon details as to which exact truck the militant leader was being transported in and on which road he was traveling. France reportedly holds Godane responsible for the abduction of two French intelligence agents in 2009, which ended in the execution of one of the officials, Denis Allex, after an unsuccessful rescue attempt by commandos in 2013.

=== September 27 ===
- The National Intelligence and Security Agency (NISA) offers a $2 million reward to any individual who provides information leading to the arrest of the new al-Shabaab leader, Ahmed Omar Abu Ubeyda. According to the NISA Commander Abdirahman Mohamed Turyare, a separate $1 million would be rewarded to any person who supplies information that could result in the killing of Ubeyda. Turyare also pledges that the informers' identities would be kept private. This is reportedly the first time that a Somalia security official is offering such large dead-or-alive bounties on an al-Shabaab leader.

=== September 30 ===
- Somali National Army forces and AMISOM troops capture Raage Ceelle from al-Shabaab. The strategic town is located around 100 km north of Mogadishu, in the Middle Shabelle province. The allied forces reportedly move into the area after seizing Warshiikh, and encounter no resistance once they enter Raage Ceelle.

== October ==
=== October 1 ===
- Somali National Army forces assisted by AMISOM troops seize Maryan-Gubaay village, situated around 60 km from Barawe in Lower Shabelle. According to the province's Governor Abdukadir Nur Siidii, the raid is part of a major operation by the allied forces to secure the area. Federal security officials also estimate that around 500 al-Shabaab fighters have defected to the government since Operation Indian Ocean was launched in August of the year. The joint forces have captured all of the Bulo Marer district in Lower Shabelle, as well as new areas in the province's Barawe district. They are now reportedly heading toward Barawe, al-Shabaab's largest remaining bastion.
- Puntland Defence Forces launch a cleanup operation against al-Shabaab militants in the Galgala area in the northern Golis mountain range. The heavily armed soldiers reportedly capture an unspecified number of militants. After seizing the Galgala mountain area, President of Puntland Abdiweli Mohamed Ali offers a 30-day amnesty period to all al-Shabaab members to turn themselves in to the regional authorities. Security officials later indicate that at least 50 U.S. military personnel participated in the Galgala attack. This is the first reported ground support in Somalia by U.S. troops since 2006. While Bari provincial Governor Abdisamad Mohamed Galan was visiting the frontlines, U.S. special forces in armoured fighting vehicles were seen in the Galgala area. The foreign military personnel were reportedly gathering intelligence ahead of the raid on the Puntland forces' behalf. They also helped Puntland army units dismantle Improvised Explosive Devices and conducted tactical surveillance.
- Somali government forces and AMISOM troops capture Adale from al-Shabaab. The strategic town is located 222 km northeast of Mogadishu, and had served as one of two areas in the Middle Shabelle province from which the militants would launch attacks. The insurgents reportedly vacated Adale ahead of the raid, which is part of an intensified push by the joint forces against al-Shabaab. According to residents, the troops entered the town from the direction of adjacent Haji Ali.

=== October 2 ===
- Kenyan AMISOM fighter jets launch airstrikes on al-Shabaab bases near the Jilib district in Middle Juba. Independent sources indicate that the attack has caused significant casualties among the militants. However, neither al-Shabaab nor the Kenyan forces issue statements on the raid.

=== October 3 ===
- Al-Shabaab militants reportedly vacate Barawe ahead of a raid by Somali government forces and AMISOM troops. According to local residents, the insurgents began to depart from the town in the morning, indicated that they would return, and threatened to decapitate anyone found assisting the joint forces. Barawe is situated 150 km from Mogadishu in the Lower Shabelle province, and was the insurgent group's largest remaining bastion.

=== October 5 ===
- Somali government officials announce that Somali military forces assisted by AMISOM troops have captured Barawe from al-Shabaab. The port town is situated in the Lower Shabelle province, around 180 km (110 miles) south of Mogadishu. It was the militant group's largest remaining stronghold and served as a strategic hideout, revenue center, and training base for the outfit for the past several years. While many of the insurgents began vacating the area yesterday after getting word of the approaching joint forces, a number reportedly stayed behind to defend their positions. According to the Lower Shabelle Governor Abdulkadir Mohamed Nuur Sidii, al-Shabaab sustained at least 13 fatalities in the ensuing battle, while two of the allied soldiers were wounded. The Somali military official Abdi Mire also confirms that the army is now in full control of Barawe. Most of the soldiers are garrisoned on the outskirts of the city, with a few stationed inside. Additionally, the Governor indicates that the situation is calm, and that the regional administration is slated to meet with local residents and traditional elders. Al-Shabaab military operations spokesman Sheikh Abdiasis Abu Musab does not issue a statement with regard to the militants vacating Barawe. He instead asserts that the insurgents incinerated two government vehicles in an area close to the town, an ambush which the AU indicates was unsuccessful.

=== October 6 ===
- Jubba interim administration forces assisted by Kenyan AMISOM troops push al-Shabaab out of Buulogudud and several other local areas. The village is situated 30 km west of Kismayo, the Lower Jubba province's capital. Al-Shabaab militants vacated the area without mounting a resistance. The attack and other raids against the insurgent group come after the conclusion of a reconciliation conference in Kismayo. Jubaland President Ahmed Madobe also issues a 48-hour ultimatum to the militants to surrender. Kenyan AMISOM spokesman David Obonyo indicates that 22 al-Shabaab fighters were killed during the offensive, while three Somali National Army soldiers and one Kenyan troop were wounded. He also says that the joint forces impounded weapons and ammunition and demolished three vehicles. Additionally, they have captured the Yoontoy and Koban localities. The allied forces are now heading toward the Jilib and Jamame districts and remaining areas nearby where al-Shabaab maintains bases and training grounds. According to Jubaland spokesman Abdinasir Serar Mah, they are approaching Jilib, Bu'alle, Saakow and Salagle.

=== October 8 ===
- Jubaland forces and AMISOM troops seize Mugaanbow, Baar Sanguuni and Bangeenni in Lower Jubba from al-Shabaab. Kenyan fighter jets also launch airstrikes during the raid, though the number of casualties is uncertain. According to Jubaland commander Adan Gojar, the joint forces are now marching toward Kabsuma, situated 90 km north of Kismayo and Jilib. Although the militants have reportedly severed telecommunication lines in Jilib, the allied forces are also nearing Jana Abdale.

=== October 9 ===
- Interim Juba administration forces assisted by AMISOM launch cleanup operations in Hagar locality and other areas in the Lower Juba province. According to officials, the aim is to secure local areas vacated by al-Shabaab. Correspondents in the area report that the allied forces clashed in some parts of the region with the militants. The joint forces are now marching toward Jilib district.

=== October 23 ===
- Al-Shabaab militants attack Somali government forces' positions in Sabiib near the Afgooye district. According to the village's governor Mayow Mayow, the government troops manage to successfully repel the insurgents. Casualties are reported, but the exact number is unspecified. The area is calm the following day, with government forces in pursuit of al-Shabaab remnants in the vicinity.

=== October 24 ===
- Interim Jubba Administration (IJA) forces capture Biroole in the Lower Jubba region from al-Shabaab. The village is a key area, linking the Jubba Valley with the North Eastern Province. According to the IJA spokesman Abdinasir Serar, the Interim Jubba Administration forces slew four al-Shabaab militants during the raid, but he did not specify the number of IJA casualties.

=== October 25 ===
- Interim Juba Administration forces and AMISOM troops seize Kuda Island from al-Shabaab. The island is located around 170 km from the Lower Juba capital of Kismayo. According to IJA security officials, seven militants were killed in the skirmish, while two soldiers from the allied forces were slain and one was wounded. They also indicate that they have impounded weapons and military vehicles. The joint forces are now reportedly carrying out local security operations. They are also set to march toward remaining al-Shabaab bases in the Kulbiyow and Badhade localities.

=== October 28 ===
- President of Somalia Hassan Sheikh Mohamud, Special Representative of the Chairperson of the AU Commission for Somalia and Head of AMISOM Ambassador Maman S. Sidikou, State Minister for Defence Mohamed Ali Hagaa, Deputy Minister for Public Works and Reconstruction Mohamed Ismail Shurie, senior Somali National Army officers, and AMISOM military officials hold a press conference briefing the media on the progress of Operation Indian Ocean. Deputy Chief of the Defence Staff General Abdirisak therein provides a military campaign map and indicates that the mission focused on coastal areas where al-Shabaab still had a foothold. The joint forces in the process captured eight strategic towns since the launch of the operation, with more about to fall. According to Sidikou, the southern port town of Koday was seized just 48 hours earlier by Somali forces, who received surveillance and logistical support from their UN and AMISOM partners. The capture reportedly further prevents al-Shabaab from entering, exiting and re-arming themselves through seaport access. Additionally, Bula Haji and other small Lower Juba villages have also been liberated. Sidikou also indicates that al-Shabaab now only controls a few major towns in the south. Among these settlements are Jilib, Jamame, Buale and Sakow in the Middle Juba province, Bardere in the Gedo province, and Diinsor in the Bay province, in addition to a few smaller towns such as El-Dere in the Middle Shabelle province.
- Interim Juba Administration forces and AMISOM troops reportedly capture Abdalla Biroole and other areas in the Lower Juba province from al-Shabaab. According to IJA spokesman Abdinasir Serar Maah, the joint forces in the process confiscate weapons and military vehicles from the insurgents. Kenyan AMISOM officials also indicate that they targeted al-Shabaab hideouts and bases in the province, with airstrikes reportedly carried out. Casualty figures are uncertain. Al-Shabaab also do not issue a statement on the IJA raid.
- President of Somalia Hassan Sheikh Mohamud offers an extra 60-day amnesty period to all al-Shabaab fighters who renounce the militant group and its ideology. The offer comes immediately after the expiration of the government's initial 45-day amnesty window, during which over 700 insurgents reportedly defected. The new amnesty period is valid from November 1 to December 31.

=== October 29 ===
- Somali government forces assisted by Ethiopian AMISOM troops repel a nighttime raid by al-Shabaab militants in the central town of El Garas. According to national army spokesman Mohamed Kariye Roble, the allied forces kill three insurgents during the skirmish.
- Ahlu Sunna Waljama'a senior official Mohamed Yusuf al-Qadhi announces that his group and Somali government forces aim to capture Bardhere district in the Gedo province from al-Shabaab. The provincial capital of Bardhere is the militant group's last local bastion. Al-Qadhi adds that seizing the area will be facilitated by the small number of al-Shabaab fighters left in the town. Additionally, he indicates that Somali government forces and Ahlu Sunna Waljama'a troops have already captured many other areas from the insurgents.

=== October 30 ===
- Somali government forces assisted by AMISOM troops seize new areas in the Galgadud province from al-Shabaab. According to the Eel-Garas administrator, the joint forces have now launched a security sweep in the captured territory. He also encourages local residents to help as best they can in the security efforts, and indicates that the allied forces will soon march toward the remaining areas in the region that are held by the insurgent group. Al-Shabaab does not issue a statement on the raid.

== November ==
=== November 5 ===
- Interim Juba Administration forces and AMISOM troops capture new areas in the Lower Juba province from al-Shabaab. According to Col. Abdifatah Moalim Noor Salim, the joint forces have impounded weapons and apprehended several militants during the raid. He adds that they aim to drive the insurgents completely out of the province and bring the territory under the IJA's control.

=== November 8 ===
- According to local residents, al-Shabaab militants recapture Kudhaa Island (Kuda Island) from Jubaland forces and AMISOM troops. The insurgents are heavily armed and attack Jubaland military stations. The gunfight lasts three hours, with an estimated 23 fatalities. Jubaland forces are reportedly encumbered by potholes on the roads leading to the area, which were caused by torrential rains.

=== November 9 ===
- Somali government forces kill several al-Shabaab militants during a skirmish in Galgaduud. According to senior security official Mohamed Kaariye Arale, the joint forces are now heading toward the remaining areas in the province that are under insurgent control.

=== November 10 ===
- Kenyan warplanes launch airstrikes in some Lower Juba localities, including Kuda Island. According to Interim Juba Administration security officials, the fighter jets were targeting specific local al-Shabaab positions. They also assert that at least 60 militants were slain during the raid, among whom were some senior commanders. Additionally, IJA representatives vow to recapture the area from the insurgent group.
- Al-Shabaab insurgents vacate Kudhaa Island. The fighters are traveling in armoured vehicles, and reportedly take with them an unspecified number of local residents. The departure immediately follows a pledge by Jubaland spokesman Abdinasir Serar Mah to recapture by force the island from the militant group.

=== November 12 ===
- Somali government forces clash with al-Shabaab insurgents at a security checkpoint in Maya Fulka. The gunfight lasts almost an hour. According to security officials, seven militants are killed during the skirmish.

=== November 13 ===
- Somali federal government forces and AMISOM troops attack al-Shabaab hideouts near Goofgaduud Shabelle in the Bay province. The vicinity is situated around 20 km from Baidoa. According to Somali National Army commander Mohamed Mohamud Nur, the joint forces kill two al-Shabaab fighters during the raid, with one government soldier incurring wounds.

=== November 19 ===
- The Bulo-Burte administration announces that Somali government forces and AMISOM troops have captured the Yooman locality in the Hiran province from al-Shabaab. According to the district commissioner Abdiaziz Duurow Abdi, the joint forces attacked the militant group's garrisons after receiving intelligence. He adds that they are now in full control of the town, and that casualties include two soldiers and many insurgents. Al-Shabaab do not issue a statement on the raid.

== December ==
=== December 2 ===
- Somali government forces and AMISOM troops seize El-deer town in the Middle Shabelle province from al-Shabaab. Residents indicate that the locality was taken without any fighting. The insurgents also do not issue any statement on the raid. According to security officials, the capture of the town represents an important stage in the joint forces' effort to liberate southern and central areas from the militants.

=== December 3 ===
- Somali government forces and AMISOM troops launch a large security operation in Bulo-Burte district following mortar shelling on their bases in the area. According to the district commissioner Osman Gedi Elmi, the joint forces arrest an unspecified number of individuals during the early morning raid.
- Security officials and AMISOM representatives announce that police and intelligence service units successfully dismantled several al-Shabaab terror cells that were operating in the capital. A few hours later, a suicide car bomber targets an AMISOM convoy near the airport, ramming into one of the vehicles. Heavy gunfire ensues, and at least four people are killed. Al-Shabaab later claims responsibility for the attack. Federal security agencies spokesman Qasim Ahmed Robleh concurrently holds a press conference, where he indicates that the government forces managed to foil the attack before it reached its intended target. He also states that the fatalities include a security official who died in the line of duty, and that the authorities are attempting to gauge the exact number of casualties. Additionally, Benadir administration spokesman Ali Seeko urges residents to cooperate with the policing agencies in order to maintain security.

=== December 15 ===
- Somali government forces and al-Shabaab clash in Tihsile on the outskirts of Afgoye district. According to a local resident, the gunfight began when al-Shabaab attacked the Lower Shabelle locality. Casualties include four wounded and seven dead individuals. Government forces are now in full control of the area, with the situation on the ground stable.

=== December 16 ===
- Somali government forces and AMISOM troops conduct security operations in the Mogadishu and Lower Shabelle vicinities, including the Kaxda district up to Elasha Biyaha area, Arbiska and Lafole. The sweep is prompted by gathered intelligence suggesting that al-Shabaab was aiming to launch attacks in the capital from the latter locations. Seven militant suspects are in the process apprehended by the joint security forces. According to Ministry of National Security spokesman Mohamed Yusuf Osman, more such cleanup operations are slated to be launched as part of the Stabilization Plan.

=== December 20 ===
- The United Nations Security Council committee on Somalia removes former al-Shabaab affiliate Mohamed Said Atom from its 1844 sanctions list. The decision came after Atom had over the summer defected from and renounced his allegiance with the militant group. According to Minister of Information Mustafa Duhulow, the announcement was prompted by lobbying on the part of the Federal Government of Somalia, which had negotiated with UN officials and member states to pardon individuals like Atom who have since disavowed extremist links.

=== December 25 ===
- An official, an al-Shabaab spokesman, and a witness indicate that al-Shabaab militants have attacked AMISOM's main Halane base in Mogadishu, prompting an exchange of gunfire with soldiers. The compound also serves as an office for local UN operations, with the airport and British and Italian embassies situated nearby. According to the insurgent group, its fighters were targeting a Christmas party inside the complex. AMISOM spokesman Col. Ali Aden Houmed indicates that at least eight militants entered the area. However, a Western diplomat within the compound states that its walls were not penetrated. Mohamed Abdi, a policeman at the adjacent airport, also reports hearing explosions. Total casualties are uncertain. According to Houmed, five of the attackers were killed, with three gunned down and two blowing themselves up beside a fuel depot; the remaining three militants may have escaped. UN spokesman Aleem Siddique likewise states that all UN personnel are safe. Additionally, roads leading to the airport have been sealed. According to AMISOM, five of its troops as well as one foreign contractor were killed during the attack. Ambassador Maman Sidikou adds that the attackers were wearing military fatigues, and that access to the facility will hereafter be tightened. AMISOM spokesman Houmed later clarifies that only two of the militants had absconded, but they were eventually besieged within the compound's underground holes that they had fled to. He likewise indicates that AMISOM troops are now in full control of the base, and that the authorities have launched a probe into the attack. Ministry of National Security spokesman Mohamed Yusuf announces a few hours later that government forces and AMISOM have captured the four surviving al-Shabaab militants who attacked the base.

=== December 27 ===
- A Somali intelligence officer indicates that senior al-Shabaab commander Zakariya Ismail Ahmed Hersi has surrendered to local police in the southwestern Gedo province. According to the official, Hersi may have turned himself in after having fallen out earlier in the year with other al-Shabaab members loyal to the group's late leader Godane.

=== December 29 ===
- Somali government forces assisted by AMISOM troops capture a series of towns in the central Hiran province from al-Shabaab. Among the liberated areas are Mirgab, Anfac, Burweyn, Hero Lugole, Rahale, Jar and Janbiley. According to Col. Mohamud Mohamed Qafow, the joint forces are also aiming to deliver a supply convoy to Bulo Barde. Additionally, national army soldiers are dispatched to Jalalaqsi in the Middle Shabelle province to help the AU garrison.
- The U.S. Pentagon announces that its jets have conducted an airstrike targeting a senior al-Shabaab commander in Somalia. Military spokesman Rear Admiral John Kirby does not specify the identity of the targeted insurgent leader, but indicates that the raid was carried out in the southern town of Saakow. He adds that U.S. security personnel have not discerned any civilian casualties, and that they are still gauging the strike's relative impact. Somalia's National Intelligence and Security Agency announces a few hours later that the raid killed the al-Shabaab intelligence chief Abdishakur (Tahlil). According to security officials, the slain militant leader was part of a unit that was tasked with carrying out suicide attacks. He had reportedly been assigned the position only a couple of days prior, after his predecessor Zakariya Ahmed Ismail Hersi turned himself in to police in the southwestern Gedo region. The spy agency also indicates that two other al-Shabaab insurgents were killed during the airstrike. Pentagon press secretary Kirby later confirms that Tahliil Abdishakur was killed by Hellfire missiles that were fired by an unmanned U.S. aircraft. Given the fact that Tahliil served as the head of al-Shabaab's elite Amniyat unit, Kirby suggests that the militant's death will substantially impact al-Shabaab's ability to effectively carry out attacks against government, civilian and international targets.

== See also ==
- Somali Civil War (2009–present)
- 2009 timeline of the Somali Civil War
- 2010 timeline of the Somali Civil War
- 2011 timeline of the Somali Civil War
- 2012 timeline of the Somali Civil War
- 2013 timeline of the Somali Civil War
- 2015 timeline of the Somali Civil War
