= Mohamed Haji Mukhtar =

Somali scholar and writer (born 1947)

- محمد حاج مختار; Maxamed Xaaji Mukhtaar
- Born: 13 June 1947 (age 79); Hudur, Upper Juba Commissariat, British-occupied Somalia
- Education: Al Azhar University
- Occupations: Scholar, writer

Mohamed Haji Mukhtar (Somali: Maxamed Xaaji Mukhtaar, Arabic: محمد حاج مختار; was born 13 June 1947) is a Somali scholar and writer currently in the United States.

== Biography ==
He is born in Hudur, a city in the middle of former Italian Somalia, which was at the time of his birth under the British Military Administration BMA of post-World War II. Hudur is the heartland of Af Maay language and culture. The saying Howaal ii Hudur (ba) mal Huraw (You can avoid neither the grave nor Hudur) shows the proud ethnocentricity of its inhabitants. Hudur fall in the hands of Italian colonial occupation in 1914 and remained a thriving city within the Alta Jubba (Upper Jubba) region. From 1974, it became the capital of a newly created region Bakool. He is naturalized U.S. citizen; son of Malak Mukhtar Malak Hassan, a highly respected chief of chiefs of the Digil and Mirifle Somali clans. His children are Saida, Salah, and Subeida.

He is known as an advocate of the use of Maay-Somali language, and all other Somali languages that exist in Somalia. He is an historian, currently a Professor of African and Middle Eastern History at Savannah State University SSU in Savannah Georgia, USA. He has been teaching at this institution since 1991.

== Education ==
Mukhtar started his primary education at Scuola Elementare di Corcor, in Korkoor, and completed in Mogadishu at Scuola Elementare di Hamar Jajab, then Istituto Discipline Islamiche. In 1966, Mukhtar pursued his higher education and earned his B.A., M.A. and Ph.D. from Al-Azhar University in Cairo, Egypt., the world's oldest and most venerated school of Islamic studies; majoring in history and civilization. His Ph.D. dissertation is titled: Al-Sumal al-Itali fi Fatrat al-Wisayah Hatta al-Istiqlal, 1950-1960 (Italian Somaliland from Trusteeship to Independence 1950-1960)

From 1975 to 1983, he was a professor of History at the Somali National University in Mogadishu, and from 1986 to 1990, he taught at the National University of Malaysia.

Dr. Mukhtar is a two-time Fulbright-Hays Scholar, first in 1983–1984 at the University of Pennsylvania in Philadelphia, and then between 1984 and 1985 at the University of South Carolina in Columbia, South Carolina. He also held fellowships from the Istituto Italiano per l'Africa and the Arab League Educational, Cultural and Scientific Organization (ALECSO), in 1980 and 1981–1982, respectively, as well as from the National Endowment for the Humanities (NEH) in 2002.

== Career ==
Dr. Mukhtar, started his career as a researcher at Akadeemiyaha Dhaqanka Somaliyeed (The Somali Academy of Culture) in 1974. While there, he surveyed coastal towns of Banadir, mainly, Marka, Baraawa and their environs, and identified historical sites of the area. In 1976, he conducted field research in Lower and Middle Juba valley tracking the history of Gosha people's history and trade relations between Kismayu and Zanzibar. In 1977, Dr. Mukhtar also surveyed Northeastern and Northwestern regions of Somalia exploring their political and economic conditions during the British Military Administration BMA in Somalia 1940-1950. From 1975 to 1983, Dr. Mukhtar became an associate professor of History at College of Education, Lafoole; Somali National University SNU, Mogadishu, Somalia. The only college that the medium of instruction was English and Arabic. He taught Middle Eastern History and Somali History. Indeed, he was the first to offer courses on the History of Somalia. In addition, he taught Historiography and supervised Senior Research Projects.

Dr. Mukhtar is a two-time Fulbright Hays Scholar, first as a Senior Research African Scholar in 1983-1984 at the University of Pennsylvania in Philadelphia working on the translation and publication of his Ph.D. dissertation; and then from 1984 to 1985.

at the University of South Carolina USC, in Columbia as a Curriculum Development Specialist, worked with the Department of Government and International Relations GINT who were interested in offering courses on the Indian Ocean Studies. From 1986 to 1990, Dr. Mukhtar was associate professor at the Universiti Kebangsaan Malaysia UKM (The National University of Malaysia) in Kuala Lumpur, teaching The History of Islamic Civilization in Africa, and the Arabic Language. He held Fellowships from the Istituto Italiano per L’Africa, Rome 1979; the Arab League's Education, Culture and Science Organization ALECSO 1980-1982, as well as the National Endowment for the Humanities NEH in 2002.

Dr. Mukhtar's research focuses on the history of the Islamic World, Northeast Africa, and Southern Arabia. His areas of publication and conferences are conflict resolutions and reconciliation, and Muslim experiences in the United States of America. He has recently published a chapter titled: “The Rise and Expansion of Islam.” In The Middle East: Its History and Culture, edited by Jason Tatlock (University of Maryland Press, 2012), 47-64. In 2010, he published “Language Marginalization, Ethnic Nationalism and Cultural Crisis in Somalia.” In Milk and Peace, Drought and War: Somali Culture Society and Politics, edited by Virginia Luling and Markus Hohne (London: Hurst, 2010), 281-300. Coauthored a language dictionary titled: English-Maay Dictionary (London: Adonis & Abbey, 2007); and in 2003, Historical Dictionary of Somalia, New Edition (Lanham, Maryland: The Scarecrow Press, Inc., 2003).

Dr. Mukhtar has long been a producer and correspondent of British Broadcasting Corporation BBC, African and Arabic Service as well as the Voice of America VOA. From 1989 to 2003, he is a founding member of Ergada Wadatashiga Somalia (Somali Peace, and Consultation Committee), Harrisburg, Pennsylvania, USA, and chaired this committee from 1996 to 2010. The Ergada is a group of Somali scholars and professionals actively pursued a peaceful settlement through direct discussions with protagonists as well indirectly through consultations with United Nations and international institutions. From 2007 to present, he is the founder and President of the Center for Peace-Building Initiative CPBI, Savannah, Georgia, USA, and from 1992 to present, a founding member and chair of the Inter-Riverine Studies Association ISA, Detroit, Michigan, USA. The ISA is an academic organization found in 1993 to reexamine the assumptions upon which the sociocultural, economic and identity formations of the Somali society is based.

From 2000 to present Dr. Mukhtar is a board member of the Savannah Council on World Affairs SCWA, Savannah, Georgia, USA, as well as board member of Global Advisory Board for Human Dignity and Humiliation Studies, Paris, France. He is also member of the American Association of Teachers of Arabic (AATA), he is Editorial and Advisory Board member for AFRICA, Rivista Semestrale di Studi e Richerche, Universita di Pavia, Italy. From 1996-2002, Dr. Mukhtar served Chief Editor, Demenedung, Newsletter for the Inter-Riverine Studies Association (ISA), Detroit, Michigan, and from 1988-1994, He was a contributing editor to Islamyyat, Journal of the Universiti Kebangsaan Malaysia. Dr. Mukhtar, works closely with the

International institutions that are engaged in crisis and conflict areas of the world, including the United Nations High Commissioner for Refugees UNHCR, The Swedish Life and Peace Institute LPI, the Canadian Institute of Peace and Conflict Studies CIPCS, The U.S. Institute of Peace just to mention some. He led peace and reconciliation missions and wrote reports on conflict areas in the Horn of Africa, particularly on Somalia, Ethiopia, Kenya and the Diaspora.

Dr. Mukhtar has long been a producer and correspondent of the BBC African Service, and is presently the chairperson of the Somalia Committee for Peace and Reconciliation (Ergada) as well as the Inter-Riverine Studies Association (ISA).

He is currently a professor of African & Middle Eastern History at Savannah State University in Savannah, Georgia.

== Bibliography ==
Mukhtar has written numerous scholarly works on the history and sociology of Somalia and Islam.

History and Historiography

- 'Arabic Sources on Somalia', History in Africa 14 (1987).
- Somalia: World Bibliographical Series. With Mark W. Delancey, Vol. 92, (Santa Barbara: CA. Clio Press, 1989).
- Historical Dictionary of Somalia, New Edition (2003).
- 'Somali Responses to Colonial Occupation (The Inter-Riverine Case)' in Putting the Cart Before the Horse: Contested Nationalism and the Crisis of the Nation-State in Somalia, edited by Abdi Kusow (2004).
- 'A Remembrance of Salah Mohamed Ali and Aw Jama Umar Isse: The Passing of A Generation in Somali Studies.' Northeast African Studies 15:1, (2014).
- 'Al-Masadir al-Arabiyyah fi Tarikh al-Sumal. [Arabic Sources on the History of Somalia]. In ALECSO Monthly, No. 16 (Mogadishu: 1982).
- Habka Cilmiga ee Baarista Taariikhda. [Methodology of Writing History], (Lafoole: Somalia, Lafoole College Press, 1978).

Islam

- 'Islam in Somali History: Fact and Fiction', in The Invention of Somalia, edited by Ali Jimale Ahmed (1995).
- 'Islam Among Early Slaves in The Americas.', Savannah Morning News, (Savannah: Georgia, February 8, 2008).
- 'The Rise and Expansion of Islam', in Jason Tatlock (ed.), The Middle East: Its History and Culture, Bethesda, M.D.: University Press of Maryland, 2012.
- Mukhtar, M. H. (2016). "Ajuran Sultanate". In MacKenzie, John (ed.). The Encyclopedia of Empire (1 ed.). Hoboken, NJ: Wiley. ISBN 9781118440643.
- Mukhtar, M. H. (2016). "Adal Sultanate". In MacKenzie, John (ed.). The Encyclopedia of Empire (1 ed.). Hoboken, NJ: Wiley. ISBN 9781118440643.

Politics

- 'Al-Wahdah al-Ifriqiyyah wa Atharaha 'Ala al-Harakaat al-Taharruriyyah.' [The Organization of African Unity OAU and its impact on the African Liberation Movements] In The League of African State Bulletin, (Cairo: 1972).
- 'The Plight of the Agro-Pastoral Society of Somalia', Review of African Political Economy 70 (1996)
- 'The Emergence and Role of Political Parties in the Inter-River Region of Somalia From 1947-1960', Ufahamu 17, no. 2 (1989).
- 'African Solution to African Problems: The End of Mogadishu Syndrome.'In Ulf Johanson Dahre (ed.), Post-Conflict Peace-Building in the Horn of Africa, (Lund: Sweden, Lund University Press, 2008).
- 'Somalia Trampling the Grass.' In The World Today, by the Royal Institute of International Affairs, Vol. 63 (February, 2007).
- 'Somalia: A Window of Opportunity.' In Addis Fortune No. 7, (Addis Ababa, February, 2007).
- 'Somali Reconciliation Conferences: The Unbeaten Track.' In African Renaissance, Vol. 3, No. 5 (September/October, 2006).
- 'Background of the Conflict: What Went Wrong with the Somali Peace Initiatives.' In Report from the 2nd Somali Peace Conference, (Oslo: Norway, International Red Cross Press, 2006).
- 'The Real News from Somalia.' In The Washington Post, (November 18, 1995).

Society

- 'Somalia: Searching for the Foundation of Social and Civil Morality', in The Proceedings of the 6th Somali Studies International Association, edited by Jorg Janzen (2001)
- 'Somalia: Between Self Determination and Chaos,' in Mending Rips in the Sky, edited by Hussein Adam and Richard Ford (1997).

Linguistics

- 'Songs from the South.' In Voice and Power: The Culture of Language in Northeast Africa. Essays in the Honour of B.W. Andrzejewski, edited by R.J. Hayward and I.M. Lewis, (London: School of Oriental and African Studie, 1996).
- 'Language Marginalization, Ethnic Nationalism and Cultural Crises in Somalia.', In Milk and Peace, Drought and War: Somali Culture, Society and Politics, edited by Virginia Luling and Markus Hoehne, (London: HURST Publishin, 2010).
- 'Multi-Lingual Somalia: Ploy or Pragmatic.', In SGMOIK Bulletin, No. 37 (Bern: Switzerland, 2013)
- 'Arabic in Somalia.' In The Encyclopedia of Arabic Language and Literature, Vol. 4, (Leiden: Brill, 2008).
