= Yed District =

Yed
- District
- Country: Somalia
- Region: Bakool
- Capital: Yed
- Time zone: UTC+3 (EAT)

Yed District (Somali: Degmada Yeed) also known as Yeed District is a district of the southwestern Bakool region of Somalia. Its capital is Yed.
