= Burdho =

Coordinates: 4°10′26″N 44°41′45″E

Burdho is small village in Bakool region, located close to the border between Hiiraan and Bakool Regions in Somalia.
