= Sabun =

Sabun may refer to:

- Abd al-Karim Sabun, Sultan of Wadai from 1804 to 1815
- Kampong Sabun, a village in Brunei
- Sabun (river), a river in the Khanty-Mansi Autonomous Okrug of Russia
- Sabun, Somalia, a town in the Middle Shabelle region of Somalia
