= Zakariya Ismail Hersi =

Somali militant

Sakariya Ismail Hersi is a former high-ranking member of Al-Shabaab, a militant group in Somalia. He was the head of intelligence and part of the group's leadership before surrendering to Somali authorities in December 2014. His surrender was seen as a significant blow to Al-Shabaab, as he was one of the most wanted members of the group, with a bounty placed on his head by the U.S. government.

After his defection, Hersi expressed his willingness to cooperate with the Somali government and work towards peace. His move was seen as a sign of internal divisions within Al-Shabaab and a potential pathway for encouraging more defections from the group. His case was notable in Somalia's efforts to weaken the militant group from within.

== See also ==
- Operation Indian Ocean
- Timeline of al-Shabaab-related events
- 2014 timeline of the Somali Civil War
