= Qurajome =

Qurajome Qurajoome
- Town
- Country: Somalia
- Region: Bakool
- Time zone: UTC+3 (EAT)

Qurajome (Somali: Qurajoome) is a town in the southwestern Bakool region of Somalia. Qurajome Town in Bakool is inhabited of Jijeele subclans of Hawiye. The town has many lakes and farmlands.
