= Tiyeglow =

Tiyeglow Tiyeeglow
- Town
- Location in Somalia
- Coordinates: 4°2′0″N 44°31′0″E
- Country: Somalia
- State: South West
- Region: Bakool

Government
  - Occupation: al-Shabaab

Population
  - Total: 2,000
- Time zone: UTC+3 (EAT)

Tiyeglow (Maay: Tiyeeglow, Somali: Tiyeegloow), sometimes also called Tieglow, is a town in the southwestern Bakool region of Somalia. It has a population of around 117,000 inhabitants. The broader Tiyeglow District has a total population of 117,053 residents.
