= Rab Dhuure =

Rabdhuure Rabdhuure
- Town
- Location in Somalia.
- Coordinates: 4°21′00″N 43°09′00″E
- Country: Somalia
- State: South West
- Region: Bakool
- District: Rabdhure District
- Time zone: UTC+3 (EAT)

Rab Dhuure, also known as Rabdhure, is a town in the southwestern Bakool region of Somalia and capital of the Rabdhure District. Rabdhuure is one of the five districts in Bakool region of South West State.

== History ==
In March 2014, Somali Armed Forces assisted by an Ethiopian battalion with AMISOM captured the town from Al-Shabaab. The offensive was part of an intensified military operation by the allied forces to remove the insurgent group from the remaining areas in southern Somalia under its control.

According to Prime Minister Abdiweli Sheikh Ahmed, the government subsequently launched stabilization efforts in the newly liberated areas, which also included Hudur, Wajid and Burdhubo. The Ministry of Defence was providing ongoing reassurance and security to the local residents, and supplying logistical and security support to deliver relief assistance. Additionally, the Ministry of Interior was prepared to support and put in place programs to assist local administration and security operations. A Deputy Minister and several religious scholars were also dispatched to all four towns to coordinate and supervise the federal government's stabilization initiatives.

== Demographics ==
The broader Rabdhure District has a total population of 57,652 residents.<ref name="Rdatp">"Regions, districts, and their populations: Somalia 2005 (draft)" (PDF). UNDP.</

The inhabitants of the district are the Ligse Muuse celi sub-clan Arap who also the dominant clan in Bakool region.
