= 2014 Hotel Amalo attack =

Terrorist incident in Somalia

- Part of Somali Civil War (2009–present)
- Location: Buloburde, Somalia
- Date: 18 March 2014; ~02:00–07:00 (UTC+03:00)
- Attack type: Suicide car bombing, shooting
- Deaths: 27+

On 18 March 2014, a car loaded with explosives detonated outside the Hotel Amalo in Buloburde, Somalia, which was used by African Union and Somali troops who had captured the town from Al-Shabaab a week earlier. Gunfire was reported to have followed for five hours, the car bombing having occurred around 02:00 local time (23:00 UTC). At least 27 people were killed in the attack.

== Overview ==
The town of Buloburde had been controlled by Al-Shabaab for five years, until being captured by African Union and Somali forces around a week prior to the attack. After the car bombing at the hotel, the town was stormed by Al-Shabaab-fighters, attacking high-ranking mainly Djiboutian and Somali officers. Initial claims by Al-Shabaab said that over thirty soldiers had been killed and more than eighty injured, while Somali officials reported six to twelve to have been killed and twenty injured. Four Al-Shabaab militants were reportedly among the dead. According to a later report citing the Norwegian Police Security Service (PST) in September 2015, at least 27 people were killed in the attack.

The suicide bomber was identified as 60-year-old Burhan Ahmed Abdule, who had lived in Halden, Norway since 2005 as a respected family man and immigrant role model, as well as Labour Party-supporter who was once photographed as part of an immigrant delegation who met Prime Minister Jens Stoltenberg in the Norwegian parliament. In September 2014, the Norwegian Police Security Service (PST) concluded that Abdule took part in the attack, making him the first known suicide bomber with ties to Norway (he has later been followed by others). In a pre-attack interview published by Al-Shabaab, Abdule states to have been a member of the Al-Qaida-affiliated Al-Itihaad al-Islamiya (AIAI) group for thirteen years prior to joining its successor Al-Shabaab in 2006.

== See also ==
- 2014 timeline of the War in Somalia
- Hassan Abdi Dhuhulow
