= El Barde =

- Town
- Country: Somalia
- Region: Bakool
- District: El Barde
- Time zone: UTC+3 (EAT)

El Barde (Somali: Ceel Barde) is a town in the Bakool region of Somalia. The larger El Barde District has a total population of 64,404 residents.

== Notes ==
It is inhabited by Awlyahan clan of Larger Ogaden.The Town is very important Trading Route between Ogaden region of Ethiopia and Somalia.
