= Tiyeglow District =

Tiyeglow
- District
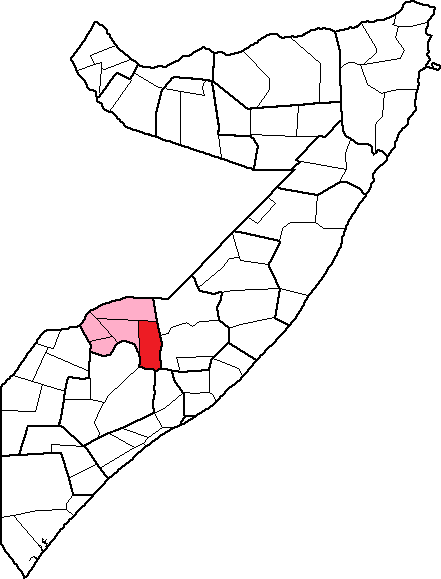
- Country: Somalia
- Region: Bakool
- Capital: Tiyeglow
- Time zone: UTC+3 (EAT)

Tiyeglow District (Somali: Degmada Tayeeglow) is a district of the southwestern Bakool region of Somalia. Its capital is Tiyeglow.
