= Hudur District =

Hudur Xudur
- District
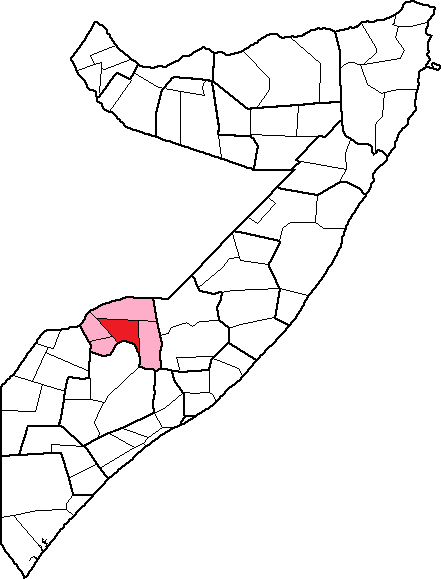
- Country: Somalia
- Region: Bakool
- Capital: Hudur

Population
  - Total: 93,049
- Time zone: UTC+3 (EAT)
- Area code: +25261

Hudur District (Somali: magaalada xudur) is a district in the southwestern Bakool region of Somalia. Its capital is the town of Hudur.

As of 2000, Hudur town had a population of around 12,500 inhabitants. The broader Hudur District had a total population of 93,049 residents.
