= El Barde District =

El Barde
- District
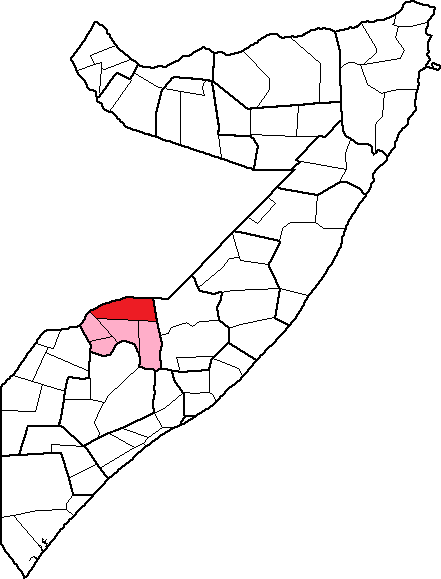
- Country: Somalia
- Region: Bakool
- Capital: El Barde
- Time zone: UTC+3 (EAT)

El Barde District (Somali: Degmada Ceel-Barde), is a district of the southwestern Bakool region of Somalia. Its capital is El Barde.
