= Burdhubo District =

Burdubo Buurdhuubo بورطوب
- District
- Burdubo
- Interactive map of Burdubo
- Country: Somalia
- Region: Gedo
- Capital: Burdhubo

Population (2015)
  - Total: 25,422
- Time zone: UTC+3 (EAT)

Burdhubo District, also spelled Buurdhuubo, in Arabic بورطوب, is a district in the southwestern Gedo region of Somalia. Its capital is Burdhubo.

The jihadist group Al-Shabaab has operated in the district in recent years. On 4 November 2011, some of its members kidnapped ten district clan elders. On 6 January 2012, Voice of America reported that the Somali media had stated that government troops, backed by Kenyan forces, were advancing into the area, while Al-Shabaab had withdrawn from the district. In March 2014, it was reported that heavy fighting had broken out and that government forces, this time aided by Ethiopian soldiers, had forced Al-Shabaab to vacate the district.

A 12 April 2014 government decree announced that Hassan Mohamed Ali and Ali Mataan Ali had been appointed district commissioner and deputy commissioner respectively. On 30 January 2015, Hassan Mohamed Ali confirmed that his deputy had been shot and killed by government troops. Eight soldiers were apprehended for Ali Mataan's death.
