= 2014 Villa Somalia attack =

Terrorist incident in Somalia

- Part of Somali Civil War (2009–present)
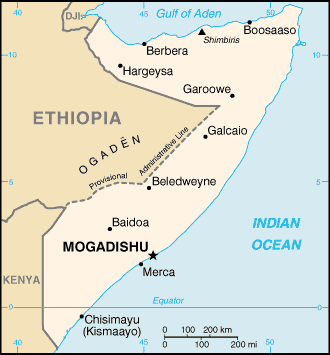
- Location of Mogadishu in Somalia
- Location: Mogadishu, Somalia
- Date: 21 February 2014
- Attack type: Suicide bombing, shooting
- Deaths: >14

On 21 February 2014, Al-Shabaab militants launched a surprise attack on the Somali presidential palace Villa Somalia in Mogadishu, where the president and speaker of parliament live and have their offices. All nine of the attackers were slain during the ensuing shootout with palace guards and security, with at least five Somali security officials also killed.

== Overview ==
The assault was presumably targeting government officials praying at the compound mosque. The heavily armed fighters were traveling in three cars and were dressed in guard uniforms and red berets worn by security at the palace. They were able to talk their way through the outer perimeter of security. Once past that, one of the cars, which was rigged with a suicide bomb, blasted through the gate of the compound, creating an entryway into the palace. Two of the suicide bombers were killed in the incident. The seven other men dismounted their cars and engaged in an intensive shoot-out with palace guards. According to a senior official reporting about the attack, all of the militants died, with some blowing themselves up, while others were shot. Several government guards also died during the exchange.

The Al-Shabab militants were eventually overwhelmed by Somali government reinforcements along with AMISOM troops. Government casualties were estimated at five palace guards, including deputy intelligence chief of the Somali Army Gen. Mohamed Nur Shirbow and Mohamed Abdulle, a close aide to the prime minister. Several Somali soldiers were also killed. All nine of the attackers were slain.

Somali President Hassan Sheikh Mohamud was reported unharmed along with the prime minister. The Interior Ministry subsequently held a press conference in front of the palace, where the bodies of seven of the attackers were displayed.

== See also ==
- 2014 timeline of the War in Somalia
