= Rabdhure District =

- District
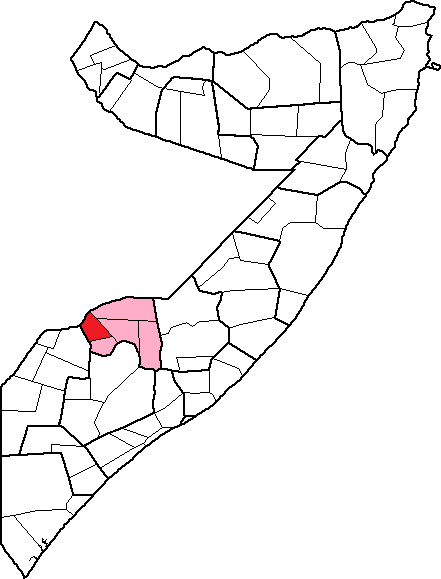
- Country: Somalia
- Region: Bakool
- Capital: Rab Dhuure
- Time zone: UTC+3 (EAT)

Rabdhure District (Somali: Degmada Rabdhuure) is a district in the southwestern Bakool region of Somalia.
