= Wajid, Somalia =

Wajid Weejid Weejidow
- Town
- Location in Somalia
- Coordinates: 3°48′30″N 43°14′51″E
- Country: Somalia
- State: South West
- Region: Bakool
- District: Wajid District

Population
  - Total: 60,105
- Time zone: UTC+3 (EAT)

Wajid (Somali: Waajid) is a town in the southern Bakool region of Somalia. It is inhabited by Mirifle with Jiroon the majority in the town. It is the capital of the Wajid District.

== Overview ==
Wajid is located approximately 302 kilometres (188 mi) northwest of the national capital Mogadishu, 78 kilometres (48 mi) southwest of Hudur, and 69 kilometres (43 mi) southeast of the Somalia-Ethiopia border.

In March 2014, Somali Armed Forces assisted by an Ethiopian battalion with AMISOM captured the district from Al-Shabaab. The offensive was part of an intensified military operation by the allied forces to remove the insurgent group from the remaining areas in southern Somalia under its control.

According to Prime Minister Abdiweli Sheikh Ahmed, the government subsequently launched stabilization efforts in the newly liberated areas, which also included Hudur, Rabdhure and Burdhubo. The Ministry of Defence was providing ongoing reassurance and security to the local residents, and supplying logistical and security support to deliver relief assistance. Additionally, the Ministry of Interior was prepared to support and put in place programs to assist local administration and security. A Deputy Minister and several religious scholars were also dispatched to all four towns to coordinate and supervise the federal government's stabilization initiatives.

== Demographics ==
As of 2000, Wajid had a population of around 8,100 inhabitants. The broader Wajid District has a total population of 100694 sub clan Ligse Harti Muuse celi Celi Arap residents.
