= Yeed =

- Town
- Location in Somalia.
- Coordinates: 4°33′00″N 43°02′00″E
- Country: Somalia
- Region: Bakool
- District: Yed

Government
  - Control: (Islamic State) Al-Shabaab
- Time zone: UTC+3 (EAT)

Yeed, also spelled Yed, is a town in the southwestern Bakool region of Somalia. It is situated in the Yed District.
