= Wajid District =

Wajid
- District
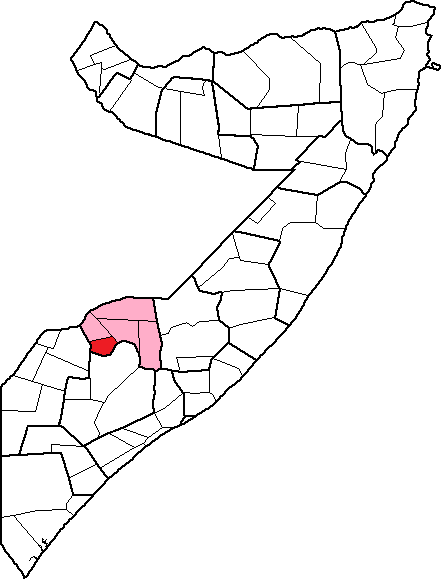
- Country: Somalia
- Region: Bakool
- Capital: Wajid
- Time zone: UTC+3 (EAT)

Wajid District (Somali: Degmada Waajid) is a district in the southwestern Bakool region of Somalia. Its capital is the town of Wajid.
