= Burdhubo =

- Town
- Location in Somalia
- Coordinates: 3.16853°N 42.49469°E
- Country: Somalia
- Region: Jubaland
- District: Gedo
- Time zone: UTC+3 (EAT)

Burdhubo (Somali: Buurdhuubo) is a town in the southern Gedo region of Jubaland, Somalia. It is the center of the Burdhubo District.

== Overview ==
Burdhubo sits on the Jubba River in the Jubba Valley, between the cities of Bardera and Luuq. Garbahare, the Gedo region's capital, is situated just 60 km (37 mi) away from Burdhubo.

The town's inhabitants cultivate crops on farms along the banks of the river. Other residents follow a pastoral lifestyle, herding camels, cattle, goats and sheep. Since the early 1990s, Burdhubo has also seen new business activities and population growth.

In March 2014, Somali Armed Forces assisted by an Ethiopian battalion with AMISOM captured the town from Al-Shabaab. The offensive was part of an intensified military operation by the allied forces to remove the insurgent group from the remaining areas in southern Somalia under its control.

According to Prime Minister Abdiweli Sheikh Ahmed, the government subsequently launched stabilization efforts in the newly liberated areas, which also included Hudur, Rabdhure and Wajid. The Ministry of Defence was providing ongoing reassurances and security to the local residents, and supplying logistical and security support to deliver relief assistance. Additionally, the Ministry of Interior was prepared to support and put into place programs to assist local administration and security apparatus. A Deputy Minister and several religious scholars were also dispatched to all four towns to coordinate and supervise the federal government's stabilization initiatives.

== Demographics ==
The broader Burdhubo District has a total population of 119,006 residents.
