= Hudur =

Hudur Huddur Hadame
- Town
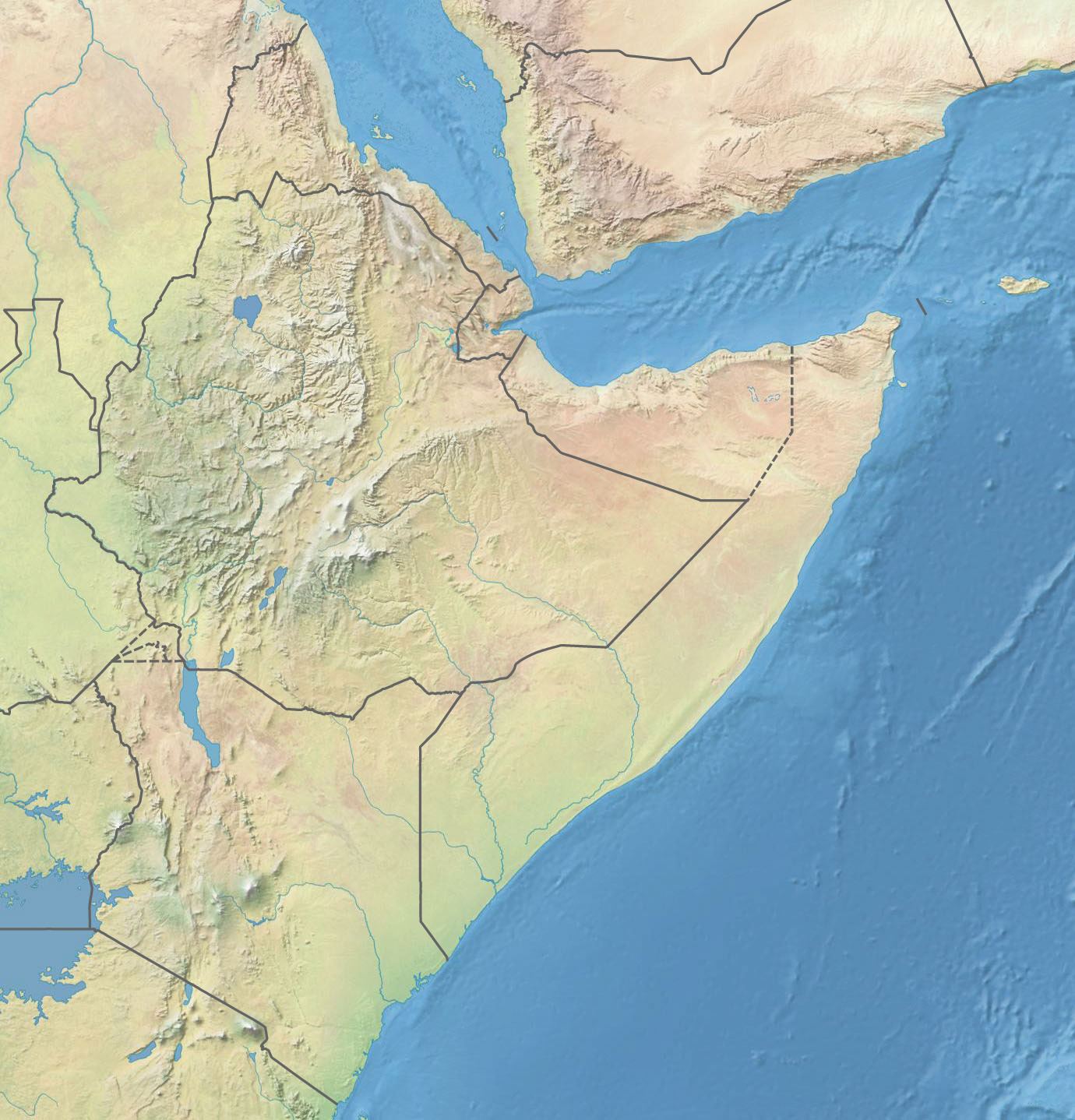
- Location within Somalia Location within the Horn of Africa Location within Africa
- Coordinates: 4°7′12″N 43°53′16″E
- Country: Somalia
- State: South West
- Region: Bakool
- District: Hudur District

Government
  - Mayor: Mohamed Moalim Ahmed

Population (2000)
  - Total: 120,000
- Time zone: UTC+3 (EAT)

Hudur (Somali: Xuddur) is a town in the south western Bakool region of Somalia.

== History ==
During the Middle Ages, Hudur and its surrounding area was part of the Ajuran Empire that governed much of southern Somalia and eastern Ethiopia, with its domain extending from Hobyo in the north, to Qelafo in the west, to Kismayo in the south.

In the early modern period, Hudur was ruled by the Geledi Sultanate. The kingdom was eventually incorporated into Italian Somaliland protectorate in 1910 after the death of the last Sultan Osman Ahmed. After independence in 1960, the city was made the center of the official Hudur District.

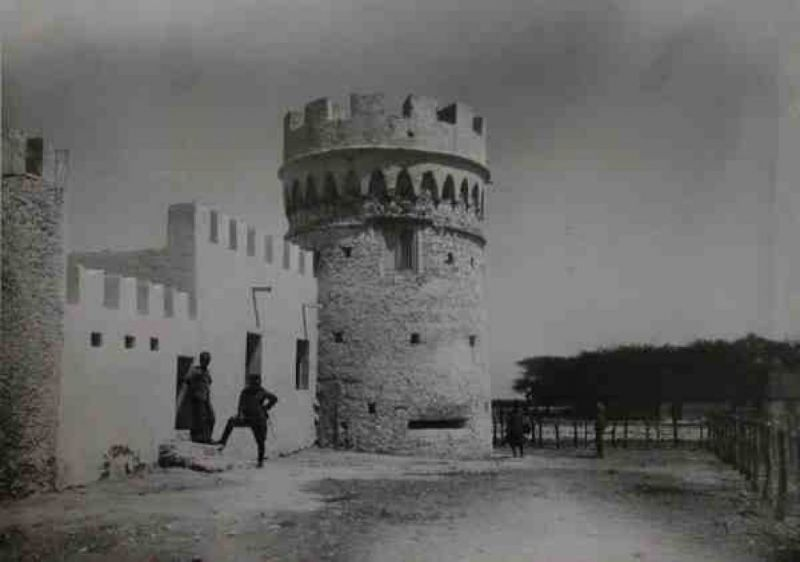
Fort of Hudur photographed in 1924

During the Islamist insurgency of the 2000s, the city was seized by Al-Shabaab. In March 2014, Ethiopian AMISOM and Somali troops re-captured the town from the militants. The offensive was part of an intensified military operation by the allied forces against Al-Shabaab.

According to former Prime Minister Abdiweli Sheikh Ahmed, the government subsequently launched stabilization efforts in the newly liberated areas, which also included Wajid, Rabdhure and Burdhubo. The Ministry of Defence was providing ongoing reassurance and security to the local residents, and supplying logistical and security support to deliver relief assistance. Additionally, the Ministry of Interior was prepared to support and put in place programs to assist local administration and security. A Deputy Minister and several religious scholars were also dispatched to all four towns to coordinate and supervise the federal government's stabilization initiatives.

== Demographics ==
As of 2000, Hudur had a population of around 12,500 inhabitants. The broader Hudur District has a total population of 93,049 residents.

Hudur is 90km away from each of the four districts and the capital Hudur is in the center.
