= Sabun, Somalia =

Sabuun
- Town
- Location in Somalia.
- Coordinates: 2°15′N 45°5′E
- Country: Somalia
- Region: Shabeellaha Hoose
- Time zone: UTC+3 (EAT)

Sabun (Somali: Sabuun) is a town in the southeastern Middle Shabelle (Shabeellaha Dhexe) region of Somalia.
