= Bakool =

Region of Somalia

Bakool Bokool
- Region
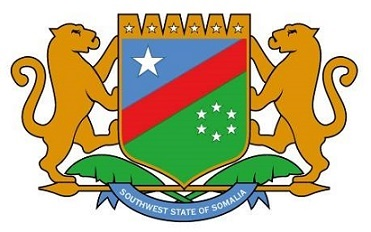
- Flag Coat of arms

- Location in Somalia.
- Coordinates: 4°20′47″N 43°32′59″E
- Country: Somalia
- Regional State: South West
- Capital: Huddur

Area
  - Total: 26,962 km^{2} (10,410 sq mi)

Population (2019)
  - Total: 1,156,400
  - Density: 42.890/km^{2} (111.08/sq mi)
- 1,234,456
- Time zone: UTC+3 (EAT)
- ISO 3166 code: SO-BK
- HDI (2021): 0.295 low · 14th of 18

Bakool (Somali: Bakool, Maay: Bokool, Arabic: بكول) is a region (gobol) in southwestern Somalia.

== Overview ==
It is bordered by the Somali regions of Hiiraan, Bay and Gedo.

Bakool, like Gedo, Bay and most parts of the Jubbada Dhexe (Middle Juba) region, used to be a part of the old Upper Region, which was subdivided in the mid-1980s. The town of Hudur is the administrative capital of the region.

In March 2014, Somali Armed Forces assisted by an Ethiopian battalion with AMISOM re-captured the Bakool province's capital Hudur from the Al-Shabaab militant group. The offensive was part of an intensified military operation by the allied forces to remove the insurgent group from the remaining areas in southern Somalia under its control.

== Districts ==
The Bakool region consists of five districts: (Note: Some sources list Rabdhure, others Yed)

- El Barde District
- Hudur District
- Rabdhure District
- Tiyeglow District
- Wajid District
- Ceelgaras

== Major towns ==
- El Barde
- Aato
- Hudur
- washaaqo
- dhuurey
- Banaaney
- Qurajome
- Rab Dhuure
- Tiyeglow
- Wajid
- Yeed
- Yowkooyow
- Buur Dhuhnle
- Garasweyne
- Moorigaabey
