= Abdullah Mohamed Fadil =

Major General Abdullah Mohamed Fadil
- Cabdalla Maxamed Faadil

Commander in Chief of the Somali Armed Forces

Personal details
- Died: January 1991
- Education: Frunze Military Academy

Military service
- Allegiance: Somalia
- Branch/service: Somali National Army
- Years of service: 1954–1991
- Rank: Major General
- Commands: Chief of Defence Force
- Battles/wars: Ogaden War

Abdullah Mohamed Fadil (Somali: Cabdallah Maxamed Faadil, Arabic: عبد الله محمد فاضل, Osmanya: 𐒖𐒁𐒆𐒖𐒐𐒐𐒖 𐒑𐒝𐒔𐒖𐒑𐒑𐒗𐒆 𐒍𐒖𐒆𐒘𐒐; born 1929 - died January 1991), was a very senior Somali, Military Officer, Strategist, Politician and a Revolutionary.

== Biography ==
Fadil was the son of a Yemeni musketeer from Taiz governorate with the Sultanate of Hobyo and a Majeerteen mother of the Nuh Jabrail family. Both parents served under Sultan Ali Yusuf Kenadid, heir to Sultan Yusuf Ali Kenadid.

Fadil was the first Joint Chiefs of Staff and Commander of the Somali Armed Forces (SAF), and was a senior member of the Supreme Revolutionary Council (SRC). A Major General in the military, he would also hold number of portfolios as a Minister, including as the Minister of Industry and Commerce, Minister of Health, Minister of Ports and Marine Transport, during the Siad Barre administration.

In the 1970s Abdullah Mohamed Fadil and Muhammad Ali Samatar advised President Barre to select top Frunze graduates to lead the campaign in Ogaden against Ethiopia to liberate Somali territories and restore the greater Somalia. This was part of a broader effort to unite all of the Somali-inhabited territories in the Horn region into a Greater Somalia (Soomaaliweyn).

== Ogaden War ==
A distinguished graduate of the M. V. Frunze Military Academy General Fadil co-managed with General Samantar Somalia's military strategy. They selected the top military leaders from Frunze known as "Frunzites" preferring the Frunzites over the Italian trained Modena graduates . Fadil and Samnatar trusted their college mates, the top graduates of Frunze Military Academy in Moscow (Военнаяакадемия им М. В. Фрунзе), an elite Soviet institution reserved for the most qualified officers of the Warsaw Pact armies and their allies to lead the Ogaden Campaign. Fadil and Samantar selected the following:

Col. Abdullahi Yusuf Ahmed commanded SNA in Negellie Front.

Col. Abdullahi Ahmed Irro commanded SNA in the Godey Front.

Col. Ali Hussein commanded SNA in Qabri Dahare Front. (Later chosen to support Harar campaign)

Col. Farah Handulle commanded SNA in the Warder Front.

General Yussuf Salhan Jigjiga Front

General Mohamed Nur Galaal assisted by Col. Mohamud Sh. Abdullahi Geelqaad commanded Dirir-Dewa. The SNA retreated from Dirir-Dewa. ( Galaal became Minister of Public Works and Leading member of the ruling Somali Revolutionary Socialist Party)

Col. Ali Isamil and Col. Abdulrahman Aare Degeh-Bur Front. (Later chosen to reinforce the Harar campaign)

== Assassination in January 1991 ==
Top Somali officials, Fadil, Samantar, among others were targeted for clan reasons as documented by Sica and Kapteijns. Following the outbreak of the civil war in 1991 and the collapse of the Barre regime, Mario Sica, then Italian ambassador to Mogadishu, documented that although the United Somali Congress (USC) professed that it was fighting against the Barre regime as a whole and not engaged in a clan-based struggle.

== See also ==
- Muhammad Ali Samatar
- Hussein Kulmiye Afrah
- Ismail Ali Abokor
- Abdirizak Mohamud Abubakar
- Salaad Gabeyre Kediye
- Dahir Adan Elmi
- Omar Massale
- Salaad Gabeyre Kediye
- Abdullahi Yusuf Ahmed
- Ali Matan Hashi
- Abdullahi Yusuf Ahmed
- Abdullahi Ahmed Irro
- Yussuf Salhan
- Muse Hassan Sheikh Sayid Abdulle
