= Vice President of Somalia =

Head of government of the Somali Democratic Republic (1969–1991)

Vice President of Somali Democratic Republic
- Madaxweyne kuxigeenka Soomaaliya (Somali)

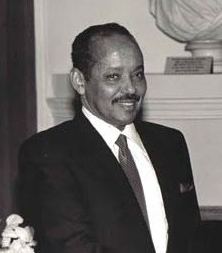
- Longest serving Mohamed Ali Samatar; August 1971 – December 1990
- Type: Second head of government
- Status: Abolished
- Abbreviation: VPS
- Appointer: The president of Somalia
- Term length: Undefined
- Formation: 21 October1969
- First holder: Jama Ali Korshel
- Final holder: Hawadle Madar
- Abolished: 24 January 1991
- Superseded by: Prime Minister

The vice president of Somalia is a former political position in Somalia. The position should have been re-established in 2024, which didn't happen due to the ongoing constitutional crisis in May 2023.

A history of the office holder follows.

== List of vice presidents ==
=== Somali Democratic Republic, 1969-1991 ===
The vice presidents in Somali Democratic Republic were appointed on the discretion of the president of Somalia, Mohamed Siad Barre. The vice presidents were as follows.

Position	Image	Name	Inaugurated	Left office	Notes
First Vice President		Jama Ali Korshel	October 1969	April 1970	
Second Vice President		Mohamed Ainanshe	October 1969	May 1971	
First Vice President		Ali Samatar	August 1971	December 1990	
Second Vice President		Hussein Afrah	1972	January 1990	
Third Vice President		Ismail Abokor	1971	1982	
Second Vice President		A.M.Farah	January 1990	January 1991	

=== Interim Government, 1991-1993 ===
The following persons were the vice presidents of Ali Mahdi Muhammad in the Interim Government of Somalia.

Position	Name	Inaugurated	Left office	Notes
First Vice President	Abdulkadir Aden	August 1991	January 1993	
Second Vice President	Omar Moallim	August 1991	January 1993	

== See also ==
- President of Somalia
- Supreme Revolutionary Council (Somalia)
