= Umar Ghalib =

Somalian politician (1930–2020)

The Honourable Umar Arteh Ghalib Cumar Carte Qaalib
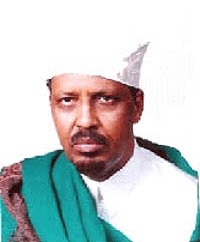

7th Prime Minister of Somalia
- In office 24 January 1991 – May 1993*
- Preceded by: Muhammad Hawadle Madar
- Succeeded by: Ali Khalif Galaydh (2000)

Minister of Foreign Affairs of the Somali Democratic Republic
- In office 1969–1976
- Preceded by: Haji Farah Ali Omar
- Succeeded by: Siad Barre

Personal details
- Born: 1930 Hargeisa, British Somaliland
- Died: 18 November 2020 (aged 89–90) Hargeisa, Somaliland
- Party: Somali Youth League
- Education: Bristol University
- *de facto to 3 January 1997

Umar Arteh Ghalib or Omer Carte Qalib (Somali: Cumar Carte Qaalib, Arabic: عمر عرتي غالب; 1930 – 18 November 2020) was a Somali politician. He was Prime Minister of the Somali Democratic Republic from January 24, 1991 to May 1993. Previously he served as foreign minister from 1969 to 1976.

== Early life and education ==
Ghalib was born in British Somaliland in 1930. He was a member of the Sa'ad Musa sub-division of the Habr Awal Isaaq clan, and belonged to the United Somali Congress.

He underwent elementary and intermediate education in Hargeisa and completed his secondary education in Sheikh, and his higher education in England where he was educated at Bristol University in the UK.

== Career ==
=== Early career ===
He started his career as a school master and then headmaster of elementary schools of Las Anod, Berbera and Hargeisa respectively. Just before he went to UK in 1956, he was appointed as vice principal of Sheikh Intermediate School. After his success in Sheikh, he went to England for higher Education. On his return in 1958 he was promoted as the first principal of Gabiley Intermediate Boarding School.

=== Minister of foreign affairs ===
From 1969 to 1976, Ghalib served as foreign minister. As foreign minister, in January, 1972 he was President of the United Nations Security Council. In 1972, he was the lead mediator between Uganda and Tanzania during the Uganda–Tanzania War. Ghalib brought Somalia into the Arab League in 1974 during his term as Foreign Minister of Somalia.

=== Prime Minister of Somali Democratic Republic ===
On 24 January 1991, and after two years under house arrest, he was appointed by then-President of Somali Democratic Republic Siad Barre as the last Prime Minister. However, before any transfer of power could take place, the United Somali Congress rapid advance forced Barre to flee Mogadishu. After Barre's ouster, the next president, Ali Mahdi Muhammad, reappointed Ghalib as prime minister, a position Ghalib would hold until May 1993.

== Imprisonment, trial, and fall of government ==
Ghalib was dismissed from his position in 1982 after disagreeing with Barre's increasingly overt policy of supporting the ethnic Somali insurrection in Ethiopia's Somali Region. Ghalib was subsequently arrested, and in 1989, after spending seven years in prison without charges, he was tried for treason and sentenced to death. Following protests from various foreign governments, Siad Barre commuted Ghalib's sentence but kept him under house arrest. In late January 1991, as his regime was collapsing, Siad Barre asked Ghalib to form a new government that would negotiate with the rebels, but the USC military successes forced Siad Barre's flight from the capital before any transfer of power could be completed.

== Notes ==
Political offices
Preceded by Muhammad Hawadle Madar	Prime Minister of Somalia; January 24, 1991–May 1993	Succeeded by vacant, 1997–2000
