= Mohammad Ali Samatar =

Somali politician; 5th President of Somalia

Lieutenant General Mohammad Ali Samatar محمد علي سمتر 𐒑𐒙𐒔𐒖𐒑𐒑𐒖𐒑𐒗𐒆 𐒖𐒐𐒘 𐒈𐒖𐒑𐒖𐒂𐒖
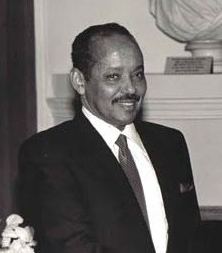

3rd Commander-in-Chief of the Somali National Army
- In office 25 November 1969 – 1 February 1987
- President: Siad Barre
- Preceded by: Siad Barre
- Succeeded by: Aden Abdullahi Nur

Minister of Defence of Somalia
- In office 1970–1987
- President: Siad Barre
- Preceded by: Salaad Gabeyre Kediye
- Succeeded by: Aden Abdullahi Nur

First Vice President of Somalia
- In office 14 August 1971 – December 1990
- President: Siad Barre
- Preceded by: Mohamed Ainanshe Guled
- Succeeded by: Office Abolished

Personal details
- Born: 1 January 1931 Kismayo, Italian Somaliland
- Died: 19 August 2016 (aged 85) Virginia, United States
- Resting place: Mogadishu, Somalia
- Party: Supreme Revolutionary Council; Somali Revolutionary Socialist Party
- Education: (Kingdom of Italy) Military Academy of Modena (Soviet Union) Frunze Military Academy

Military service
- Branch/service: Somali National Army
- Rank: Lieutenant General
- Battles/wars: 1964 Ethiopian-Somali Border War; Ogaden War; 1982 Ethiopian-Somali Border War; Somali Rebellion

Mohammad Ali Samatar. (Arabic: محمد علي سمتر, Somali: Maxamed Cali Samantar, Osmanya script: 𐒑𐒙𐒔𐒖𐒑𐒑𐒖𐒑𐒗𐒆 𐒖𐒐𐒘 𐒈𐒖𐒑𐒖𐒂𐒖; 1 January 1931 – 19 August 2016) was a Somali military officer, politician, Commander-in-Chief of the Somali National Army, Minister of Defence, Vice President (1971-1990), Deputy General Secretary of the Somali Revolutionary Socialist Party, and Prime Minister. He was known for his service in the 1964 Ethiopian–Somali Border War, Ogaden War and 1982 Ethiopian–Somali Border War.

== Early years ==
Samatar was born in 1931 in Kismayo, Somalia. For his post-secondary education, Samatar studied at the Frunze Military Academy in the former Soviet Union (Военная академия им. М. В. Фрунзе), an elite institution reserved for the most qualified officers of the Warsaw Pact armies and their allies.

== Somali Democratic Republic ==
A lieutenant general in the Somali National Army (SNA), Samatar was a key figure in Somali politics throughout the 1970s and 1980s. During the Ogaden campaign of the late 1970s, he led all SNA units and their Western Somali Liberation Front (WSLF) affiliates. He also served as national Defense Minister from 1970 to 1987.

Samatar was a member of President Siad Barre's ruling Supreme Revolutionary Council (SRC). In May 1986, Barre suffered serious injuries in a life-threatening automobile accident near Mogadishu, when the car that was transporting him smashed into the back of a bus during a heavy rainstorm. He was treated in a hospital in Saudi Arabia for head injuries, broken ribs and shock over a period of a month. Samatar, who was then serving as Vice President of Somalia from 1971 to 1990, subsequently served as de facto head of state for the next several months. Although Barre managed to recover enough to present himself as the sole presidential candidate for re-election over a term of seven years on 23 December 1986, his poor health and advanced age led to speculation about who would succeed him in power. Possible contenders included his son-in-law General Ahmed Suleiman Abdille, who was at the time the Minister of the Interior, in addition to Barre's vice president, Lt. Gen. Samatar.

From 1 February 1987, to 3 September 1990, Samatar was the national Prime Minister, the first person to fill that post since the 1969 revolution that overthrew the civilian government.

Following the outbreak of the civil war in 1991 and the collapse of the Barre regime, Samatar moved to the United States in order to escape persecution as a member of the former government. According to Mario Sica, then Italian ambassador to Mogadishu, although the United Somali Congress (USC) professed that it was fighting against the Barre regime as a whole and not engaged in a clan-based struggle, public officials who belonged to the same clan as the USC's core constituents were not targeted. Instead, they were embraced as heroes and welcomed into the rebel group's senior leadership positions.

Samatar was alleged to have overseen the Isaaq genocide in what is now known as Somaliland. Approximately 50,000-100,000 civilians were killed in the genocide whilst local reports estimate the total civilian deaths to be upwards of 200,000 Isaaq civilians. Samatar is alleged to have commanded the forces that attacked the civilian population and committed severe crimes against humanity like mass killings, kidnapping, systematic rapes, arbitrary detentions, torture, as well as other war crimes. In 2012, seven Isaaq victims won a $21 million lawsuit in the United States against Samatar for crimes against the Isaaq people.

=== Ogaden War ===
A distinguished graduate of Frunze, Samantar oversaw Somalia's military strategy. In the late 1970s, Samatar was the Chief Commanding Officer of the Somali National Army during the Ogaden Campaign. He and his frontline deputies faced off against their mentor and former Frunze alumni Marshal Vasily Ivanovich Petrov, who was assigned by the USSR to advise the Ethiopian Army, in addition to and likely not limited to 15,000 Cuban troops along with thousands of other socialist foreign ground forces supporting Ethiopia, led by General Arnaldo Ochoa. The Ogaden Campaign was part of a broader effort to unite all of the Somali-inhabited territories in the Horn region into a Greater Somalia (Soomaaliweyn).

General Samatar was assisted in the offensive by several field commanders, most of whom were also Frunze graduates:

- General Yussuf Salhan commanded SNA in Jigjiga Front assisted by Col. A. Naji, capturing the area on 30 August 1977. (Later became Minister of Tourism. Salhan was eventually expelled from the Somali Socialist Party in 1985)
- Col. Abdullahi Yusuf Ahmed commanded SNA in Negellie Front. (Later the leader of SSDF rebel group based in Ethiopia. Col Ahmed was arrested by Ethiopia's Mengistu. He was released after the collapse of the Mengistu regime in 1991)
- Col. Abdullahi Ahmed Irro commanded SNA in the Godey Front. (Retired and became a professor of Strategy in Mogadishu Somalia)
- Col. Ali Hussein commanded SNA in two front's, Qabri Dahare and Harrar. (Eventually joined the SNM late 1988)
- Col. Farah Handulle commanded SNA in the Wardheer Front. (Became a civilian administrator and Governor of Sanaag, later killed in Hargheisa as the new appointed Governor of Hargheisa in 1987 one day before he took over the Governorship)
- General Mohamed Nur Galaal assisted by Col.Mohamud Sh. Abdullahi Geelqaad commanded Dirir-Dewa. The SNA retreated from Dirir-Dewa. ( Galaal became Minister of Public Works and Leading member of the ruling Somali Revolutionary Socialist Party)
- Col. Abdulrahman Aare and Col. Ali Ismail co-commanded the Degeh-Bur Front. (Both Officers were lLater chosen to reinforce the Harar campaign; Col Aare eventually became a military attache and retired as a private citizen after the collapse of SNA in 1990)
- Col. Abukar Liban 'Aftooje' Initially served as acting logistics coordinator for the Southern Command and later commanded the SNA in the Iimeey Front. ( Aftoje became a General and a military attache to France).

== Lawsuit for crimes against humanity ==
In 2009, a civil lawsuit seeking financial damages from Samatar was filed in the United States by a small group of Somalis, some of whom were naturalized American citizens. Samatar had fled to the U.S. following the outbreak of the civil war and the collapse of the Barre regime in 1991 in order to escape persecution as a member of the former government. The individuals alleged that they had suffered physical abuse in violation of international law at the hands of soldiers or other government officials under Samatar's command, which they further claimed was due to their belonging to the Isaaq clan. However, the plaintiffs did not claim that Samatar personally committed the atrocities or that he was directly involved. Supporters of Samatar described the lawsuit as a politically motivated vendetta filed by associates of the Somali National Movement (SNM), a disbanded rebel militia linked with the secessionist Somaliland region in the northwestern part of Somalia.

Samatar asserted that he was immune from responsibility under the Foreign Sovereign Immunities Act. On 1 June 2010, in Samantar v. Yousuf, the United States Supreme Court unanimously ruled that, although Samatar's argument was "literally possible," FSIA did not cover the issue of an official's claim to immunity. The lawsuit was consequently allowed to continue against Samatar. However, the justices added that Samatar might have recourse to common law claims of immunity when the matter was heard again by the lower courts. On remand, Samatar sought dismissal of the action based on head of state immunity and foreign official act immunity. In 2011, the U.S. District Court for the Eastern District of Virginia rejected these claims, denying the motion to dismiss. It ruled that "under international and domestic law, officials from other countries are not entitled to foreign official immunity for jus cogens violations, even if the acts were performed in the defendant's official capacity." In August 2012, a U.S. federal court ruled that Samatar should pay $21 million to the plaintiffs, with each to receive $1 million and $2 million in compensatory and punitive damages, respectively. However, Samatar was not required to pay the damages until bankruptcy proceedings concluded. The U.S. Court of Appeals for the Fourth Circuit later upheld this decision in November 2012. This was despite the fact that US President Barack Obama's administration had urged the court not to hear the lawsuit.

In March 2013, Abdi Farah Shirdon, Prime Minister in Somalia's newly recognized Federal Government, issued a letter to the U.S. Department of State requesting that Washington grant Samatar immunity from prosecution. Samatar was previously denied immunity mainly because there was at the time no strong central authority within Somalia to claim it on his behalf. According to Samatar's attorney, Joseph Peter Drenan, the gesture was an attempt on the Somali government's part to promote reconciliation. He added that the lawsuit was now likely to be dismissed, as the U.S. authorities were expected to honor the Somali administration's request. In March 2015, the US Supreme Court upheld the civil lawsuit against Samatar, dismissing his appeal.

In 2012, a U.S. judge ultimately awarded $21 million to seven people who sued Samantar, claiming he had tortured and killed his own people. The judgment against Mohamed Ali Samantar came at the end of an eight-year legal battle that went to the U.S. Supreme Court.

== Death ==
Samatar died in Virginia, United States, on 19 August 2016. He was buried in Mogadishu, Somalia.

== See also ==
- Siad Barre
- Aden Abdullahi Nur Gabeyow
- Hussein Kulmiye Afrah
- Abdullah Mohamed Fadil
- Abdullahi Yusuf Ahmed
- Salaad Gabeyre Kediye
- Mohamed Ali Sharman
- Ismail Ali Abokor
- Muse Hassan Sheikh Sayid Abdulle
- Abdirizak Mohamud Abubakar
- Nur Cadow
- Yussuf Salhan
- Abdullahi Ahmed Irro
- Mohamed Farah Aidid
- Omar Haji Mohamed
- Mohamed Osman Irro

== Notes ==
Mohamed Nur Galaal

Government offices
Preceded by post abolished, 1970–87	Prime Minister of Somalia; 1 February 1987 – 3 September 1990	Succeeded by Muhammad Hawadle Madar
