= Ahmed Mohamoud Farah =

Somali politician

Second Vice President of Somalia
- In office January 1990 – January 1991
- President: Siad Barre
- Preceded by: Hussein Kulmiye Afrah

Personal details
- Born: 1935 Berbera, Woqooyi Galbeed, British Somaliland
- Died: 1994 (aged 58–59)
- Resting place: Holland
- Party: Supreme Revolutionary Council

Ahmed Mohamoud Farah (Somali: Axmed Maxamuud Faarax, was a Somali politician and military officer. He was one of the Vice Presidents of the Somali Democratic Republic from January 1990 to January 1991. Additionally, he was minister of industry and commerce from 1970 to 1971, minister of posts and telecommunications from 1971 to 1974, minister of mining and industry from 1982 to 1987, minister of industry from April 1989 to 1990. He was also a senior member of the Supreme Revolutionary Council, and a colonel. He hails from Adam Isa subdivision of the Isamusa sub-clan of the Isaaq.
