= Abdulkadir Mohamed Aden =

Somali politician

Abdulkadir Mohamed Aden "Zoppo"

Vice President of Somalia
- In office August 1991 – January 1993
- President: Ali Mahdi Muhammad

Personal details
- Born: 1919 Bulo Burti
- Died: 2002 (aged 82–83) Rome
- Party: Hizbiya Digil-Mirifle; Somali Youth League

Abdulkadir Mohamed Aden "Zoppo" (Somali: Cabdiqaadir Maxamed Aadan Soobe, Arabic: عبدالقادر محمد آدم زوبي), commonly known as Abdulkadir Zoppo or Abdulkadir Soobe, was a Somali politician and former Vice President of Somalia and Minister of Finance.

== Biography ==
Aden was born in 1919 in Bulo Burti. He was a businessman and politician from the Reewin clan. He was a member of Patriotic Benevolent Society in Baidoa in 1940s. He joined Somali Youth League in 1947. In 1950 he joined Hizbiya Digil-Mirifle party. He was elected member of the legislative assembly in the 1956 elections. He was elected as the vice president of Somalia National Assembly in May 1959. He re-joined Somali Youth League in 1959. Aden was appointed as the first Minister of Finance of independent Somalia from 1960 to 1964. He was appointed as Minister of Interior from 1964 to 1967. He founded the new party Dabka in 1968, and was not re-elected as a member of the assembly in the 1969 elections.

During the era of Mohamed Siad Barre Aden focused on his business ventures. In the 1980s he joined the opposition against Siad Barre. In 1989, he signed the Manifesto and joined his clansmen in forming the SDM, a paramilitary and political organisation aimed at liberating the Inter riverine region from the Siad Barre regime. Zoobe is credited as an early forerunner of Federalism in Somalia having personally led a campaign since 1950. Aden was the First Vice President in the Interim Government of Somalia from August 1991 to January 1993. He was a co-chairperson of the National Salvation Council in Sodere in 1997.

He died in Rome in June 2002.
