= Mohamed Ibrahim Liqliiqato =

Somali military and political leader

Mohamed Ibrahim liqliqato
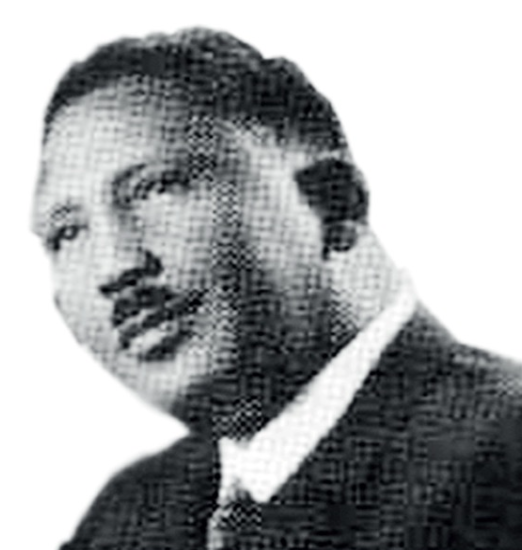

6th Speaker of the Parliament of Somalia
- In office 26 January 1982 – 1 November 1989
- Preceded by: Ismail Ali Abokor
- Succeeded by: Hussein Kulmiye Afrah

Personal details
- Born: 1921 Kismaayo, Somalia
- Died: 1998 (aged 76–77) Mogadishu

Mohamed Ibrahim Liqliqato (1921, Kismayo, Italian Somaliland – 1998) was a Somali military and political leader who worked as an ambassador, minister, speaker of the Parliament, and was a prominent figure during Siyad Barre's rule in Somalia.

In 1964, Liqliqato joined the Somali Army. In 1969, the military took over the government and new president Siad Barre appointed Liqliqato as Somali Ambassador to the Soviet Union (1969–1970). From 1970–1974, he served as Ambassador to West Germany. From 1974–1978, Liqliqato served as Minister of Agriculture, and from 1978–1980 as Minister of Domestic and Foreign Trade.
