= Somali Rebellion =

1978–1991 clan rebellion against President Siad Barre

- Part of the Somali Civil War
Date	9 April 1978 – 26 January 1991 (12 years, 9 months and 17 days)
Location	Somali Democratic Republic
Result	Rebel victory: 1982 Ethiopian–Somali Border War; Collapse of the Somali Democratic Republic; Beginning of the Somali Civil War; Somaliland declares independence on 18 May 1991

Belligerents
Somalia: SNA (until 1991); Supported by: Italy; United States	(Puntland) USC; SPM; SSDF; Ethiopia Supported by: Israel; Libya	SNM; Supported by: Ethiopia (1982-1986); South Yemen

Commanders and leaders
(Somalia) Siad Barre (Somalia) Mohammed Said Hersi Morgan (Somalia) Muhammad Ali Samatar	(Somalia) Mohamed Farrah Aidid; Abdullahi Yusuf Ahmed; Bashir Bililiqo	Ahmed Mohamed Mohamoud (Siilaanyo)

The beginnings of civil war in Somalia can be traced to April 1978, when several army officers attempted a coup after the Ogaden War and then founded the Somali Salvation Democratic Front (SSDF). The SSDF and newly formed Somali National Movement (SNM) began mounting guerrilla operations into Somalia from bases in Ethiopia. Somali Civil War grew slowly, in a series of actions against President Siad Barre's government between 1978 and 1991, ultimately bringing down the Somali Democratic Republic.

During the early 1980s the SSDF and SNM escalated their campaigns, at one point culminating in a joint Ethiopian/SSDF invasion in 1982 aimed at toppling Barre, which evolved into a protracted border conflict that severely weakened the SSDF. The SNM pressed on with hit-and-run assaults against government outposts across northwest Somalia, while Barre deployed army forces and allied clansmen to brutally suppress dissidents proliferating through the country.

Other opposition groups sprang up: the United Somali Congress (USC) in the central regions and the Somali Patriotic Movement (SPM) in the south. Islamist movements, such as Al-Itihaad al-Islamiya, also grew in strength as state authority weakened which prompted government crackdowns. However the Islamic groups only militarized after the state collapsed and none took up arms against the government.

By the late 1980s the central government began to completely unravel. Central ministries ceased to function as civil servants went unpaid and foreign aid dried up; clan loyalties supplanted national institutions. The state became increasingly repressive and violent, culminating in the bombardment of Burao and Hargeisa during mid-1988 and the July 1989 riots and massacres in Mogadishu, which marked the first large-scale urban violence in the south.

By late 1990, the country was on the brink of collapse, as the USC routed the Somali National Army in various regions of south and central Somalia. Following a major battle between the regime and rebels in Mogadishu, the Somali Democratic Republic collapsed in January 1991, marking the onset of the full-scale Somali Civil War. The rebel opposition fronts failed to offer a unified or viable political alternative after the central government fell.

== Background ==
The defeat of the Somali military at the hands of Cuban/Ethiopian forces during the Ogaden War of 1977-78 brought to the surface opposition elements within the armed forces. Another significant consequence of the war was the massive influx of refugees from the Ogaden into Somalia, estimated at over a million.

At the end of 1978 the first major outflow of refugees numbering in the hundreds of thousands headed for Somalia, and were bombed and strafed during the exodus by the Ethiopian military. This placed immense strain on the Somali Democratic Republic's (SDR) frail economy, forcing the government to increasingly rely on foreign aid to function. Thousands of pastoral Somalis were also driven from the region, bringing much of their livestock, which led to disastrous ecological impacts as Somalia's limited grazing land became overburdened.

The first serious postwar challenge to the regime came during an attempted coup in April 1978. The officers were primarily from the Majeerteen clan, and many of the coup plotters fled to Ethiopia after the Somali government had put down the insurrection. During the Ogaden War, Colonel Abdullahi Yusuf had served as a commander in the Somali National Army. After the war he deserted the army, and helped lead the failed 1978 coup attempt following which he had immediately fled to Ethiopia. In response to the coup, harsh reprisals were carried out by the government on the Majeerteen clan.

== Rebellion ==
In Ethiopia, Abdullahi Yusuf setup base for a new rebel organization called the Somali Salvation Democratic Front (SSDF) which he led and soon after began fighting with Ethiopian forces against the Somali army. The SSDF possessed little autonomy over Ethiopian security forces, as it was 'created, organized, trained and financed by Ethiopia'. With the formation of the SSDF in Ethiopia, the era of armed opposition against the Barre regime had begun.

During October 1980, President Siad declared a state of emergency and reinstated the Supreme Revolutionary Council (SRC).

=== Rise and decline of SSDF ===
With Ethiopian assistance, the SSDF began to launch guerilla attacks across the border on Somali army bases and civilian targets. The Ethiopians began using the SSDF to help hunt down Western Somali Liberation Front (WSLF) fighters. During major Ethiopian military operations in 1980 that aimed to crush the WSLF, the SSDF was used to attack WSLF camps within Somalia.

In response to rising dissent, the Somali government violently suppressed opposition movements and clans perceived to be a threat with the military and elite security forces. The government initiated a harsh policies with the aim of depriving the rebels of political and social support. Whenever the SSDF launched attacks, the regime retaliated by rounding up hundreds of Majerteen officers and purging the civil service.

==== 1982 Border War ====
The Ethiopian army intended to use the Somali Salvation Democratic Front to overthrow Barre and install a friendly regime. The guerrillas were trained by Ethiopian officers and during the 1982 invasion of Somalia, SSDF forces were directly integrated into much larger Ethiopian army units. In late June 1982, 15,000 Ethiopian army troops and thousands of SSDF rebels invaded Somalia in the Hiran and Mudug region. The offensives initially aimed for Galkayo in the north-east, and Beledweyne in central Somalia. According to Gérard Prunier, "The plan was to cut Somalia into two by driving the troops all the way to the ocean, but the plan backfired."

In spite of losses taken four years earlier during 1978 from the Ethiopian-Cuban counter offensive during the Ogaden War, the Somali army had regrouped and the invasion led to a large increase in volunteers joining the army. The Ethiopian/SSDF attack had played out to Barres advantage, as his declining regime found a significant upsurge in support. The Ethiopian and SSDF forces never reached their objectives of Galkayo and Beledweyne, but were instead halted to a stalemate at border towns of Balanbale and Galdogob.

==== SSDF decline ====
During 1982, the Barre regime successfully split the SSDF and most its members surrendered to the government following an amnesty and payment offer. By 1983 the bulk of the SSDF had rejoined the regime. Irritated by this development, the Ethiopian government put the head of the SSDF Abdullahi Yusuf in jail, where he remained until the Fall of the Derg regime in 1991. During SSDF internal fighting during 1983 and 1984, Ethiopian security forces entered their camps and arrested the rebels central committee members. After the rebels had no longer become useful to Mengistu, he had members of the organization killed, imprisoned or dispersed. The SSDF did not recover as an organization until relations with Ethiopia normalized during the tenure of Meles Zenawi.

=== Formation of SNM and northern war ===
In April 1981, a group of Isaaq business people, students, former civil servants and former politicians who lived in the United Kingdom founded the Somali National Movement (SNM) in London. Initially, the aim of the various groups that merged to create the SNM was not to create an armed liberation front, but rather these groups formed as a direct response to the harsh policies enacted by the Barre regime against the Isaaq people.

By 1982 the SNM transferred their headquarters to Dire Dawa in Ethiopia, as both Somalia and Ethiopia at the time offered safe havens of operation for resistance groups against each other. From there the SNM successfully launched a guerrilla war against the Barre regime through incursions and hit and run operations on army positions in the northern Isaaq territories before returning to Ethiopia.

== Crackdowns by the Barre administration ==
=== Against the Majeerteen ===
One of Barre's earliest forms of collective punishment targeting non-combatant clans was against the Majeerteen in 1979. Between May and June 1979, his presidential Guard, called the Red Beret, killed over 2000 Majeerteen clan members. The Umar Mahmud sub-lineage of Majeerteen particularly became the victims of this violence. Although this violence was in response to the Majeerteen-based SSDF, Barre on the other hand began to target the entire clan. Each subsequent attack by the SSDF resulted in collective punishment against the wider Majeerteen. This included sieges and blockades against Majeerteen-inhabited areas, closure of schools, closure of health-facilities, and the destruction of subsistence facilities such as water reservoirs and cattle. Each action by the Barre government, strengthened Majeerteen resolve against his regime.

=== Against the Isaaq ===
According to Rebecca Richards, systematic state violence that followed was linked to the Barre government's belief that SNM attacks were receiving assistance from the Ethiopian government. The harsh reprisals, widespread bombing and burning of villages by Barre regime followed every time there was an attack by SNM believed to be hiding in Ethiopia. The regime violence in the north and northwest was disproportionate, affected many communities, particularly Isaaq. The number of civilian deaths in this massacre is estimated to be between 50,000 and 100,000 according to various sources, whilst local reports estimate the total civilian deaths to be upwards of 200,000 Isaaq civilians. The government attack included the levelling and complete destruction of the second and third largest cities in Somalia, Hargeisa (which was 90 per cent destroyed) and Burao (70 per cent destroyed) respectively through a campaign of aerial bombardment, and had caused 400,000 Somalis (primarily of the Isaaq clan) to flee their land and cross the border to Hartasheikh in Ethiopia as refugees, creating the world's largest refugee camp then (1988), with another 400,000 being internally displaced.

A policy letter written by Barre's son-in-law and viceroy in the north General Mohammed Said Hersi Morgan known as The Morgan Report formed the basis of the Barre regime's retaliation against the Isaaq following a successful SNM attack on Hargeisa and Burao. The policy letter provided “implemented and recommended measures” for a “final solution” to Somalia's “Isaaq problem”.

A United Nations investigation concluded that the Barre regime's killing of Isaaq civilians was a genocide, and that the crime of genocide was "conceived, planned and perpetrated by the Somali government against the Isaaq people".

=== Against the Hawiye ===
The Hawiye moved quickly to occupy the south portion of Somalia. The capital of Mogadishu is located in the territory of the Abgaal and Murusade subclans of Hawiye. Since the independence era, the Hawiye tribe had occupied important administrative positions in the bureaucracy and in the top army command. However, in the late 1980s disaffection with the regime set in among the Hawiye, who felt increasingly marginalized by the Siad Barre regime. A number of Hawiye elites had joined the earlier SODAF, SSDF and the SNM movements before converging to form their own branch in the very late 80s, the United Somali Congress.

Taisier M. Ali states that Barre assuaged the Majeerteen, and targeted other groups like the Hawiye. According to Ali, "with funds and clan appeals, he [Barre] was able to entice the bulk of SSDF fighters to return from Ethiopia and participate in his genocidal wars against the Isaaq in the north and later against the Hawiye in the South, including Mogadisho". According to Mohamed Haji Ingiriis, the vicious atrocities during the reign of Barre were not an isolated event nor unusual in Somalia's history. Barre also targeted the Hawiye.

Faced with saboteurs by day and sniper fire by night, Siad Barre ordered remaining units of the badly demoralized Red Berets to kill civilians on a large scale. By 1989 torture and killing became the order of the day in Mogadishu.

The Red Berets killed 450 Muslims demonstrating against the arrest of their spiritual leaders. More than 2,000 were seriously injured. The next day, forty-seven people, mainly from the Isaaq clan, were taken to Jasiira Beach west of the city and summarily executed. The July mass killings prompted a shift in United States policy as the United States began to distance itself from Siad Barre.

With the loss of United States support, the regime grew more desperate. An anti-Siad Barre demonstration on July 6, 1990, at a soccer match in the main stadium deteriorated into a riot, causing Siad Barre's bodyguard to panic and open fire on the demonstrators. At least sixty-five people were killed. A week later, while the city reeled from the impact of what came to be called the Stadia Corna Affair, Siad Barre sentenced to death 46 prominent members of the Manifesto Group, a body of 114 notables who had signed a petition in May calling for elections and improved human rights. During the show trial that resulted in the death sentences, demonstrators surrounded the court and activity in the city came to a virtual halt. On July 13, a shaken Siad Barre dropped the charges against the accused. As the city celebrated victory, Siad Barre, conceding defeat for the first time in twenty years, retreated into his bunker at the military barracks near the airport.

The most shocking and gruesome revenge Siad Barre took against the Hawiye, in particular the Hawadle sub-clan was the massacre he ordered in January 1991, just before he escaped Mogadishu for his clan strongholds in the deep south of Somalia. It is estimated that over 6,000 individuals died in the massacre of Beledweyne, including women and children. This was a major turning point for the USC and further fueled the need to overthrow Siad Barre's regime - eventually proving successful as he was overthrown in late January. This incident in Beledweyne was the major cause for clan tensions as Siad Barre's militias mainly consisted of Marehan, Ogaden and Majeerteen militias, led by General Morgan (Majeerteen) - who had caused many civilian deaths towards Isaaq's (SNM) by sending bombers to attack the northern cities, including Hargeisa (Somalia's second largest city).

In response to mutinies by Hawiye soldiers in October 1989, the Red Berets began attacking Hawiye civilians. According to history professor Robert F. Baumann in his book 'My Clan Against The World: US And Coalition Forces In Somalia, 1992-1994', this shift of antagonism towards the Hawiye was a major military blunder since Barre's stronghold happened to be in Mogadishu, whose environs are majority Hawiye. These actions by Barre sealed his fate, as by 1990 the predominantly Hawiye USC (United Somali Congress) military group had beset the capital of Mogadishu.

=== Against Ogaden ===
The bulk of the Darood clan refugees who fled the Ethiopia-Somalia war were of the Ogaden subclan. Barre's hostility towards the Ogaden was in part derived from the huge influx of their clan members in the aftermath of war with Ethiopia, which resulted in a swelling of their numbers. This surge in their population resulted in what he viewed as an undue influence, with a change in the balance of power away from his own Marehan subclan towards the Ogaden subclan. This resulted in Barre dismissing several military officers who were of Ogaden lineage. The friction escalated when Barre purged the minister of defense, Aden Gabiyo, from office, who was of the Ogaden subclan. In May 1989, this culminated into a revolt by Ogaden soldiers stationed in Kismaayo, the formation of an anti-Barre military faction formed of Ogaden clansmen called SPM (Somali Patriotic Movement) and the defection of Ogaden colonel Omar Jess.

== Fall of Siad Barre ==
=== December 1990 – January 1991 ===
In early December 1990, the United Somali Congress held positions about 30 km northeast of the capital. Widespread violence was reported in Mogadishu, even before the main assault into the city, as a large portion of Mogadishu's population was armed during the period. On 29 December 1990, some of Barre's armed men, organized into gangs for looting, seized large amounts of money from a Hawiye-owned store- armed men from many factions rushed to the scene, and soon, the forces of the United Somali Congress were battling with government forces in Mogadishu. The USC claimed to hold "99% of Mogadishu" by 31 December, saying that fighting was ongoing around the palace and the airport, and claimed to control the capital on January 1, but this was denied by government officials, who claimed that they were still controlling the city, while also claiming that fighting was restricted in size.

Mohamed Hawadle Madar was quoted to have said that the rebels had been beaten back from an assault into Wardigley district, where the palace is located. The rebels claimed to have captured the cities' radio station, Radio Mogadishu, by January 2, but a government broadcast from the station disproved this; by this time, the government was generally known to have controlled central Mogadishu. The Somali rebels rejected attempts by Siad Barre to introduce a ceasefire, and only allowed foreign military evacuations under the watch of the Red Cross, which the Red Cross agreed to. A USC spokesman claimed that 10,000 reinforcements were arriving to Mogadishu to oust the Somali government. On 22 January, a ceasefire was implemented, according to Somali government radio, but days later, on 26 January, rebels overran the last government defenses at the Mogadishu Airport and the Presidential Palace and ousted Siad Barre, ending his 21-year rule. It was rumored that he had fled in a tank. The rebels announced their victory on the formerly government-operated radio station.

== Puntland and Somaliland ==
In 1991, the Somali National Movement declared the northwestern portion of the country independent. After two separate civil wars in the early 1990s, Somaliland, as with neighboring Puntland, returned to relative peace.
