= Interim Government of Somalia =

1991–1997 de jure government of Somalia

Interim Government of the Somali Republic
- 1991–1997
- Flag Coat of arms
- Anthem: Heesta calanka Soomaaliya
- Status: Provisional government
- Capital: Mogadishu
- Common languages: Somali · Arabic · Italian
- Religion: Sunni Islam
- Government: Unitary presidential republic
- President
  - 1991-1997: Ali Mahdi Muhammad
- Historical era: Somali Civil War
  - A multi-phased international conference on Somalia: January 1991
  - Disestablished: January 1997
- ISO 3166 code: SO
Preceded by	Succeeded by
Somali Democratic Republic	Transitional National Government of Somalia

The Interim Government of Somalia, led by Ali Mahdi Muhammad, was established immediately after the collapse of the Somali Democratic Republic. From November 1991 to 1995, Ali Mahdi Muhammad had recognition as President by several states following the 1991 Djibouti conference held between 15 and 21 July 1991, Ali Mahdi was elected interim President of Somalia for a period of two years, but because of the legitimacy conferred on Ali Mahdi by the Djibouti conference, his government was recognized by several countries, including Djibouti, Egypt, Italy, and Saudi Arabia.

However, he was not able to exert his authority beyond certain parts of the capital. Power was instead vied with other faction leaders in the southern half of the country and with autonomous subnational entities in the north. The competition for influence and resources between Muhammad and Mohamed Farrah Aidid continued on through the 1992–95 UN missions to Somalia (UNOSOM I, UNOSOM II, and UNITAF), until Aidid's eventual death in 1996.
