= Supreme Revolutionary Council (Somalia) =

1969–1991 military government of Somalia

Supreme Revolutionary Council Gollaha Sare ee Kacaanka
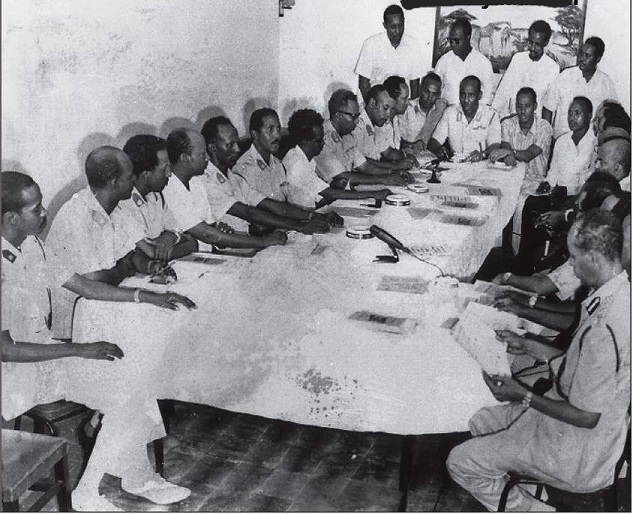
- Formation: October 1969
- Dissolved: July 1976
- Type: Acting Presidency; Collective leadership
- Headquarters: Mogadishu, Somalia
- Location: Somalia
- Region served: Somalia
- Chairman: Muhammad Siad Barre
- Vice Chairman: Jama Ali Korshel (until 1970)
- Affiliations: Presidency of Somalia; Somali Army; Parliament

The Supreme Revolutionary Council (SRC; Somali: Gollaha Sare ee Kacaanka, Arabic: المجلس الثوري الأعلى, Italian: Consiglio Rivoluzionario Supremo) was the governmental body that ruled Somalia from 1969 to 1976.

In 1980, a state of emergency was declared and the SRC was reinstated.

== History ==
=== Assassination of President and coup d'état ===
On 15 October 1969, while paying a visit to the northern town of Las Anod, Somalia's then President Abdirashid Ali Shermarke was shot dead by one of his own bodyguards. His assassination was quickly followed by a military coup d'état on the afternoon of 21 October 1969 (the day after his funeral), in which the Somali Army seized power without encountering armed opposition. The putsch was spearheaded by Major General Mohamed Siad Barre, who at the time commanded the army.

=== Establishment of Revolutionary Council ===
Alongside Barre, the Supreme Revolutionary Council (SRC) that assumed power after President Sharmarke's assassination was led by Lieutenant Colonel Salaad Gabeyre Kediye, General Mohamed Ainanshe Guled and Chief of Police Jama Korshel. Shortly afterwards Barre became the head of the SRC.

The SRC renamed the country the Somali Democratic Republic, arrested members of the former civilian government, banned political parties, dissolved the parliament and the Supreme Court, and suspended the constitution. Essentially a military junta, the SRC became the de facto executive government and consisted of 25 almost exclusively military officials. The SRC took over all the duties of the President, the National Assembly and the Council of Ministers through the proclamation of the Law Number 1. The old constitution nominally remained under perpetual suspension until the SRC later repealed it in 1970.

=== Functions and political programme ===
The revolutionary army established large-scale public works programs, including construction of the Mogadishu Stadium. It also sought to improve the social position of women, using Islamic precepts as a reference point. In addition to a nationalization program of industry and land, the new regime's foreign policy placed an emphasis on Somalia's traditional and religious links with the Arab world, eventually joining the Arab League (AL) in 1974.

The Supreme Revolutionary Council also attempted to resolve the outstanding issue of which of the various writing systems then in use in Somalia should be officialized as the main national orthography. In October 1972, the government unilaterally elected to use the modified Latin script of the linguist Musa Haji Ismail Galal for writing Somali instead of the Arabic or Osmanya scripts. It subsequently launched a large urban and rural literacy campaign designed to ensure the orthography's adoption, which helped dramatically increase the literacy rate.

The SRC further enacted a number of reforms designed to weaken the influence of traditional lineage structures and processes, which Barre regarded as a potential threat to his rule. Offences deemed clan-related were punished with fines and prison sentences, and traditional headmen employed by the previous civilian administration were substituted with hand-picked government peacekeepers (nabod doon). Orientation centers were likewise established, which took over hosting duties for marriage services. Over 140,000 nomadic pastoralists were also resettled in littoral towns and agricultural areas with the additional aim of increasing productivity.

=== Dissolution and reinstatement ===
In July 1976, Barre's SRC dissolved itself and established in its place the Somali Revolutionary Socialist Party (SRSP), a one-party government claiming to be based on scientific socialism and Islamic tenets. The SRSP was an attempt to reconcile the official state ideology with the official state religion by adapting Marxist-Leninist precepts to local circumstances. Emphasis was placed on the Muslim principles of social progress, equality and justice, which the government argued formed the core of scientific socialism and its own accent on self-sufficiency, public participation and popular control, as well as direct ownership of the means of production. While the SRSP encouraged private investment on a limited scale, the administration's overall direction was nominally socialist.

After the unsuccessful Ogaden campaign of the late 1970s, a new constitution was promulgated in 1979 under which elections for a People's Assembly were held. However, the Politburo of Barre's Somali Revolutionary Socialist Party continued to rule.

In 1980, a state of emergency was declared and the SRC was reconstituted. On 23 October Barre reinstated the Supreme Revolutionary Council via Presidential Decree No. 3, and five subcommittees were established, including Defence & Security and Political.

== Members & clan composition ==
Despite the revolutionary regime's intention to stamp out the clan politics, the government was commonly referred to by the code name MOD. This acronym stood for Mareehaan (Siad Barre's clan), Ogaden (the clan of Siad Barre's mother), and Dulbahante (the clan of Siad Barre son-in-law Colonel Ahmad Sulaymaan Abdullah, who headed the NSS). These were the three clans whose members formed the government's inner circle. In 1975, for example, ten of the twenty members of the SRC were from the Daarood clan-family, of which these three clans were a part; the Digil and Rahanwayn, the sedentary interriverine clan-families, were totally unrepresented.

The following is a list of members of the Supreme Revolutionary Council in February 1970:

Chairman
Maj.-Gen. Muhammad Siad Barre
Vice Chairman
Maj.-Gen. Jama Ali Korshel
Members
Capt. Ahmed Mohamoud Farah
Brig.-Gen. Hussein Kulmiye Afrah
Maj.-Gen. Muhammad Ainanshe
Lt.-Col. Salaad Gabeyre Kediye
Lt.-Col. Muhammad Ali Samatar
Lt.-Col. Abdullah Mohamed Fadil
Lt.-Col. Ali Matan Hashi
Maj. Muhammad Sh. Osman
Maj. Ismail Ali Abokor
Maj. Muhammad Ali Shirreh
Maj. Ahmed Suleiman Abdulle
Maj. Mohamud Gelle Yusuf
Maj. Farah Wais Dulleh
Capt. Ahmed Hassan Musa
Capt. Musa Rabille Goede
Capt. Muhammad Omer Ges
Capt. Osman Mohamed Jelle
Capt. Abdi Warsame Isaq
Capt. Abdulkadir Haji Muhamad
Capt. Abdirizak Mohamud Abubakar
Maj. Abdiqadir Xaji Masale

== See also ==
- History of Somalia
