= Hussein Kulmiye Afrah =

Vice President of Somalia (1920–1993)

Comrade Major General Xusseen Kulmiye Afrax حسين كلمي افرح Hussein Kulmiye Afrah
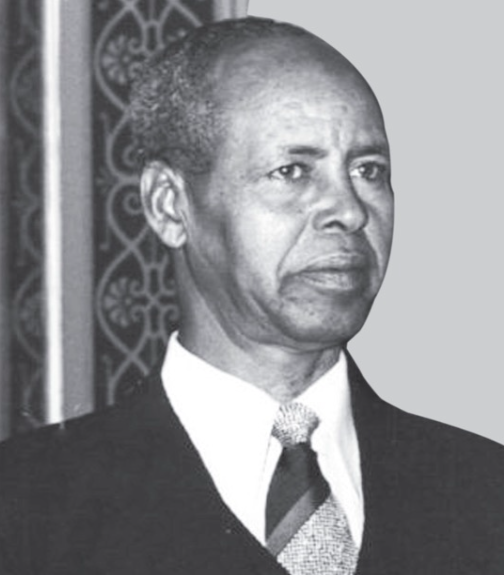

7th Speaker of the Parliament of Somalia
- In office 1 November 1989 – 26 January 1991
- President: Siad Barre
- Preceded by: Mohamed Ibrahim Liqliiqato
- Succeeded by: Abdallah Isaaq Deerow (2000)

1st Second Vice President of Somalia
- In office 5 August 1971 – 1 November 1989
- President: Siad Barre
- Preceded by: Office Established
- Succeeded by: Office Abolished

Minister of Planning and International Cooperation
- In office 5 February 1987 – 7 November 1989
- President: Siad Barre
- Preceded by: Muhammad Hawadle Madar

Minister of Interior

Personal details
- Born: 1920 El Dher, Italian Somaliland
- Died: 12 April 1993 (aged 73) Virginia, United States
- Resting place: Mogadishu, Somalia
- Party: (Somalia) Supreme Revolutionary Council (1969 - 1976); Somali Revolutionary Socialist Party (1976 - 1991)
- Education: Italy Military Academy of Modena
- Profession: Police officer . Politician

Military service
- Allegiance: United Kingdom (1941 - 1950); Kingdom of Italy (1950 - 1960) (Somalia) Somali Republic (1960 - 1969) (Somalia) Somali Democratic Republic (1969 -1991)
- Branch/service: Somali Police Force
- Years of service: 1943 - 1991
- Rank: Major General
- Battles/wars: 1964 Ethiopian–Somali Border War

Hussein Kulmiye Afrah (Somali: Xuseen Kulmiye Afrax, Arabic: حسين كلمي افرح, (1920 – 1993) was a very senior Somali police officer, revolutionary and a politician who served as the second Vice President of Somalia from 1971 to 1989 and various political positions in the Somali Democratic Republic.

== Post Civil War ==
Following the outbreak of the Somali Civil War in the late 1980s, and after the armed opposition groups overthrew the Barre government in 1991, Kulmiye, along with other Hawiye officers, was neither arrested nor expelled from Mogadishu.

== See also ==
- Siad Barre
- Muhammad Ali Samatar
- Abdirizak Mohamud Abubakar
- Abdullahi Yusuf Ahmed
- Dahir Adan Elmi
