= Somali coup d'état =

Somali coup d'état may refer to:

- 1978 Somali coup d'état attempt
- 1969 Somali coup d'état
