= Hawadle Madar =

Somalian politician (1936–2005)

Mohammad Hawadle Madar محمد حواضلي مذر

Vice President of Somalia
- In office 3 September 1990 – 24 January 1991
- President: Siad Barre
- Preceded by: Muhammad Ali Samatar
- Succeeded by: Umar Arteh Ghalib

Personal details
- Born: 1939 Hargeisa, British Somaliland
- Died: 2005 (aged 65–66) London, England
- Party: Somali Revolutionary Socialist Party
- Children: 9
- Relatives: Amina Omar (Wife)

Muhammad Hawadle Madar (Somali: Maxamed Xawaadle Madar, Arabic: محمد حواضلي مذر , 1939–2005), also known as Hawadle Madar was the Vice President of Somalia from September 3, 1990, to January 24, 1991. A former member of the Somali Revolutionary Socialist Party, he was in office in the period leading up to the outbreak of the Somali Civil War. He was a member of the Sa'ad Musa sub-division of the Habr Awal Isaaq clan.

== Biography ==
Madar was born in 1939 in the northwestern town of Hargeisa, then a part of British Somaliland. Madar studied in the Soviet Union, where he received a Bachelor of Science in engineering. Madar held several ministerial positions in the Somali Democratic Republic. Between 1975 and 1981, Madar served as Minister of Public works, followed as the Minister of Communication and Post from 1981 to 1983. He also served as a Minister of Planning (1984–1986). Madar headed the economy committee of the People's Assembly. Then, he was elected as deputy speaker of the People's Assembly. On 3 September 1990, Madar appointed as Vice President of Somalia, a position he held until 24 January 1991, eventually succeeded he was replaced by Umar Arteh Ghalib.

== Death ==
Madar died on January 9th. 2005 in High Barnet hospital, London, UK, due to prostate cancer. He was buried in Hargeisa, Somaliland.

== Notes ==
Political offices
Preceded by Muhammad Ali Samatar	Vice President of Somalia; September 3, 1990–January 24, 1991	Succeeded by Umar Arteh Ghalib
