= Ali Mohamed Osoble =

Somali politician (1930–1990)

Ali Mohamed Osoble (Somali: Cali Maxamed Cosoble [Cali Wardhiigleey]) or (Ali Mohamed Osoble Wardeegle) Ali Mohamed Osoble (Somali: Cali Maxamed Cosoble [Cali Wardhiigleey]) or (Ali Mohamed Osoble Wardeegle) was a prominent Somali politician and Member of Parliament in the civilian government Osoble was born in Ceelbuur in 1930. He held ministerial positions (including from 1967 was Minister of Health and Social Affairs and 1969-69 Minister for Information of the Egal Government. ) before the takeover of the Siad Barre military government. Before he founded with others the U.S.C he was the Vice chairman of the S.N.M from 1984 to 1987 and he left them after he disagreed with the Ethiopians on the Unity of Somalia. From January 1989 he was elected in Rome as first chairman of U.S.C. He died in Rome in 1990.
