= Abdirizak Mohamud Abubakar =

Abdirizak Mohamud Abubakar (born 1937 – died 1997) was a Somali military leader. He joined the nascent Somali military in 1960. He was selected by the commanding officers to be part of the Supreme Revolutionary Council in 1969 along with his seniors Muhammad Ali Samatar, Abdullah Mohamed Fadil and others under the leadership of the Chief Commanding Officer Siad Barre. His efforts aided Somalia's forces defeat the Ethiopian Army in 1977 under the leadership of General Muhammad Ali Samatar and his subordinates.

He was appointed minister of education from 1970 to 1974, minister of local governments and rural development from 1977 to 1978, minister of agriculture from 1987 to 1989 and minister of livestock and animals from 1989 to 1990.

The Ogaden Campaign was part of a broader effort to unite all of the Somali-inhabited territories in the Horn region into a Greater Somalia (Soomaaliweyn).

== Contributions to Ogaden War ==
Abdirizak Mohamud Abubakar was an instrumental figure in creating and gathering international support for Somalia's effort to peacefully unite Somali people. He campaigned within Africa and the Arab World. His efforts assisted Somalia's forces defeat the Ethiopian Army in 1977 under the leadership of General Muhammad Ali Samatar and his subordinates. The Ogaden Campaign was part of a broader effort to unite all of the Somali-inhabited territories in the Horn region into a Greater Somalia.
