= 1978 Somali coup attempt =

Coup d'état attempt against the President of Somalia Siad Barre

1978 Somali coup d'état attempt
- Part of the Cold War
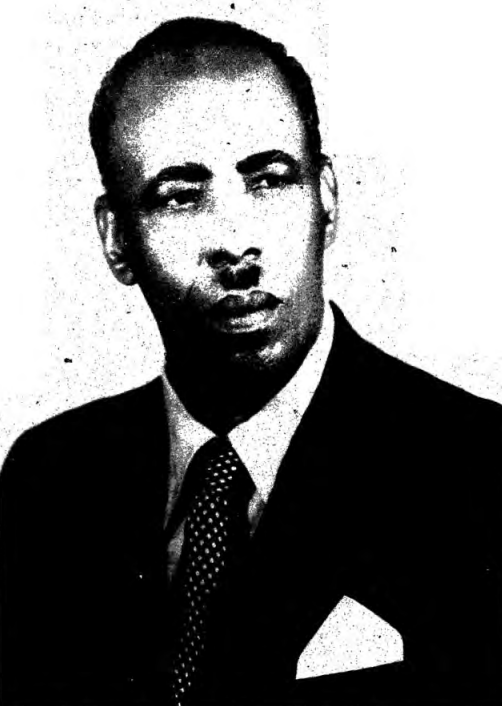
- Somali dictator Siad Barre in 1978
Date	9 April 1978; 48 years ago
Location	Mogadishu, Somalia
Result	Coup attempt fails: Siad Barre remains in power; Abdullahi Yusuf Ahmed fled to Kenya; First anti-Siad Barre rebel group founded SSDF

Belligerents
Government of the Somali Democratic Republic	Military faction Alleged support: Soviet Union; Cuba

Commanders and leaders
(Somalia) Siad Barre	Mohamed Osman Irro (executed); Abdullahi Yusuf Ahmed

Strength
Unknown	24 officers 2,000 soldiers 65 tanks

Casualties and losses
- 17 plotters executed.

The 1978 Somali coup attempt was a violent military coup attempt that took place in Somalia (then Somali Democratic Republic) on 9 April 1978, against the regime of President Siad Barre. The United States Central Intelligence Agency estimated that the coup, led by Colonel Mohamed Osman Irro, involved around 24 officers, 2,000 soldiers, and 65 tanks. Following the failed coup, 17 alleged ringleaders, including Osman, were summarily executed by firing squad.

== Background ==
The coup attempt was staged by a group of disgruntled Army officers, led by Colonel Mohamed Osman Irro, in the aftermath of the disastrous Ogaden War against Ethiopia (then ruled by the Mengistu-led Derg). The war was initiated by President Siad Barre, who had himself come into power a decade earlier in the 1969 Somali coup d'état.

A United States Central Intelligence Agency (CIA) memorandum written the following month speculated that the coup was in response to Barre ordering the arrest and execution of officers that participated in the Ogaden War. The officers believed that Barre had intentionally used troops from other clans as "cannon fodder" while officers from his own Marehan clan were given safer orders. The report concluded that the officers involved in the coup "were motivated at least as much by long-standing ethnic animosities toward Barre as by disenchantment with his regime in the aftermath of the Ogaden debacle".

== Coup ==
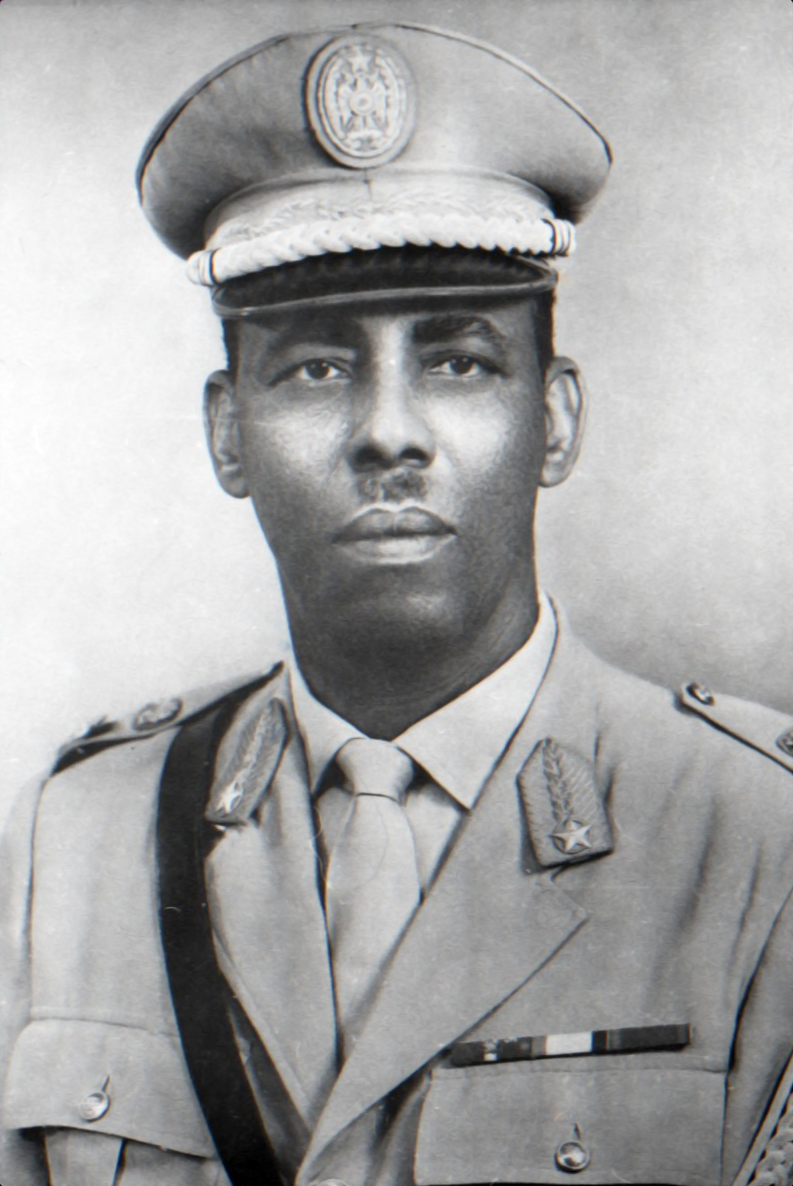
Siad Barre around 1970

The coup was launched on 9 April 1978. The bulk of the fighting concluded within the day.

Gunfire broke out at the village of Afgooye, south of the capital Mogadishu, and small-arms fire and explosions were heard on the outskirts of the capital. The coup was originally planned to start in Hargeisa, but Barre likely knew of the attempt in advance and was able to disrupt the coup before it launched, as well as position forces loyal to himself in the capital.

The CIA estimated that the coup involved around 24 officers, 2,000 soldiers, and 65 tanks.

== Aftermath ==
Following the failed coup, 17 alleged ringleaders, including Osman, were summarily executed by firing squad. Barre used the coup as justification to purge members of the clans involved in the coup from government and military positions.

One of the plotters, Lieutenant Colonel Abdullahi Yusuf Ahmed, escaped to Ethiopia and founded an anti-Siad Barre organization initially called the Somali Salvation Front (SSF; later the Somali Salvation Democratic Front, SSDF), initiating the Somali Rebellion and eventually the Somali Civil War.

== Allegation of Eastern Bloc involvement ==
Barre blamed the coup attempt on the Eastern Bloc, namely Soviet Union and Cuba, countries that supported Ethiopia in the Ogaden War, calling them "new imperialists". The CIA determined that the Soviet Union was not behind the coup attempt, but were seeking to remove Barre. Immediately following the coup, Somalia began receiving foreign aid from the People's Republic of China.
