= United Somali Congress =

Defunct Somali anti-communist rebel group

United Somali Congress Golaha Midnimada Soomaaliyeed
- Commander/leader: Ali Mohamed Osoble (1989-1990); Mohamed Farrah Aidid (1990-1996); Hussein Farrah Aidid (1996-2000)
- Founded: 1987; 39 years ago
- Dissolved: 2000; 26 years ago
- Split from: SNM
- Headquarters: Mogadishu
- Ideology: Anti-communism; Anti-Barre; Hawiye interests Somali nationalism Greater Somalia
- Group: Hawiye
- Colours: Green

The United Somali Congress (USC, Somali: Golaha Midnimayada Soomaaliyeed) was one of the major rebel organizations in Somalia. Formed in 1989, it played a leading role in the ouster of the government of Siad Barre in 1991. Following infighting, the USC later splintered into two wings, led by Muhammad Farah Aidid and Ali Mahdi Muhammad.

Both Ali Mahdi and Aidid claimed to lead national unity governments, and each vied to lead the reconstruction of the Somali state. In an attempt to expand both their bases through alliances with other armed groups and political entities, Aidid's USC wing morphed into the Somali National Alliance (SNA) faction, while Mahdi's wing became the Somali Salvation Alliance (SSA).

By 2000, with the establishment of a Transitional National Government (TNG), a process of disarmament was put in motion and some ex-USC leaders were incorporated into the new interim administration.

== History ==
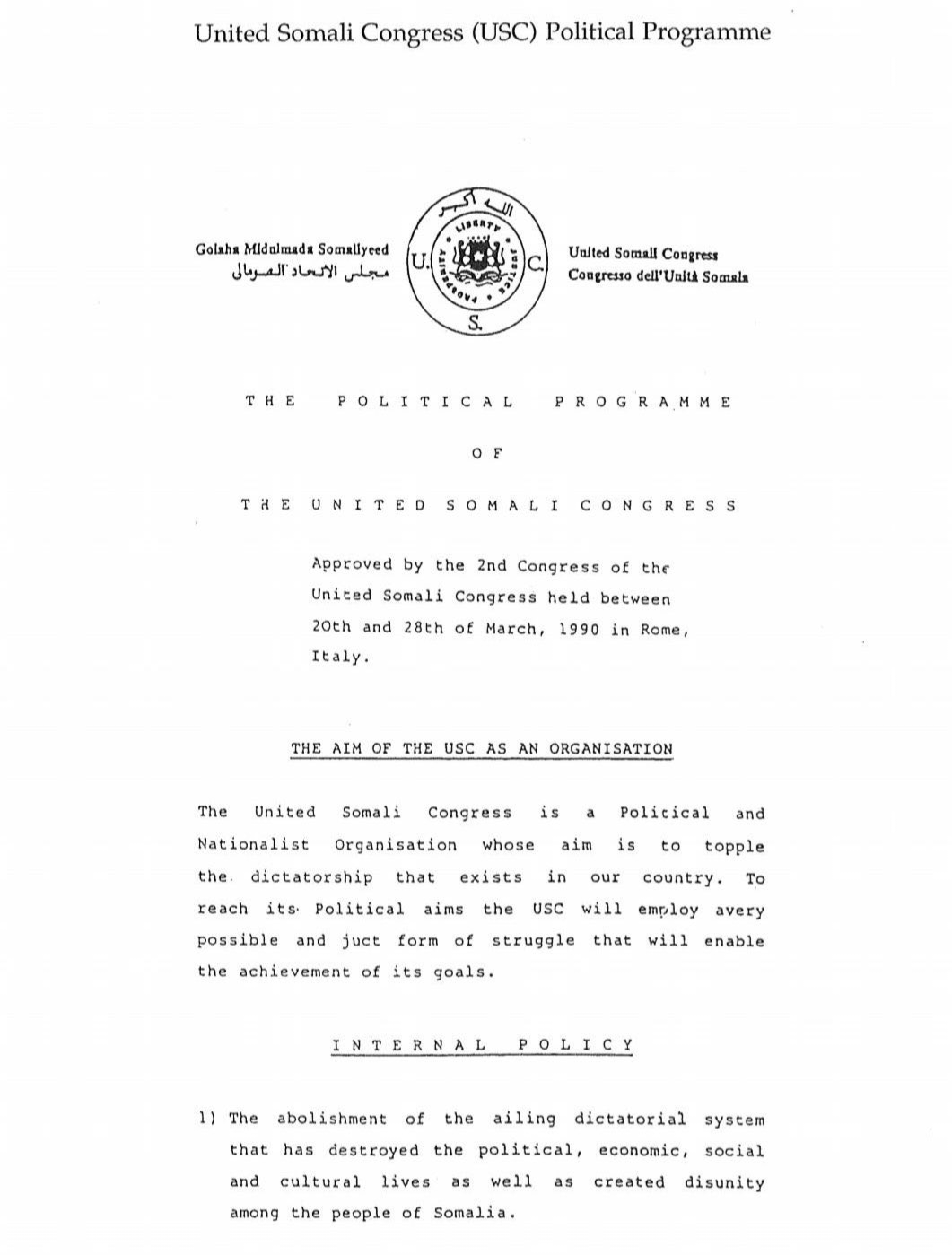
USC 1990 Political Programme

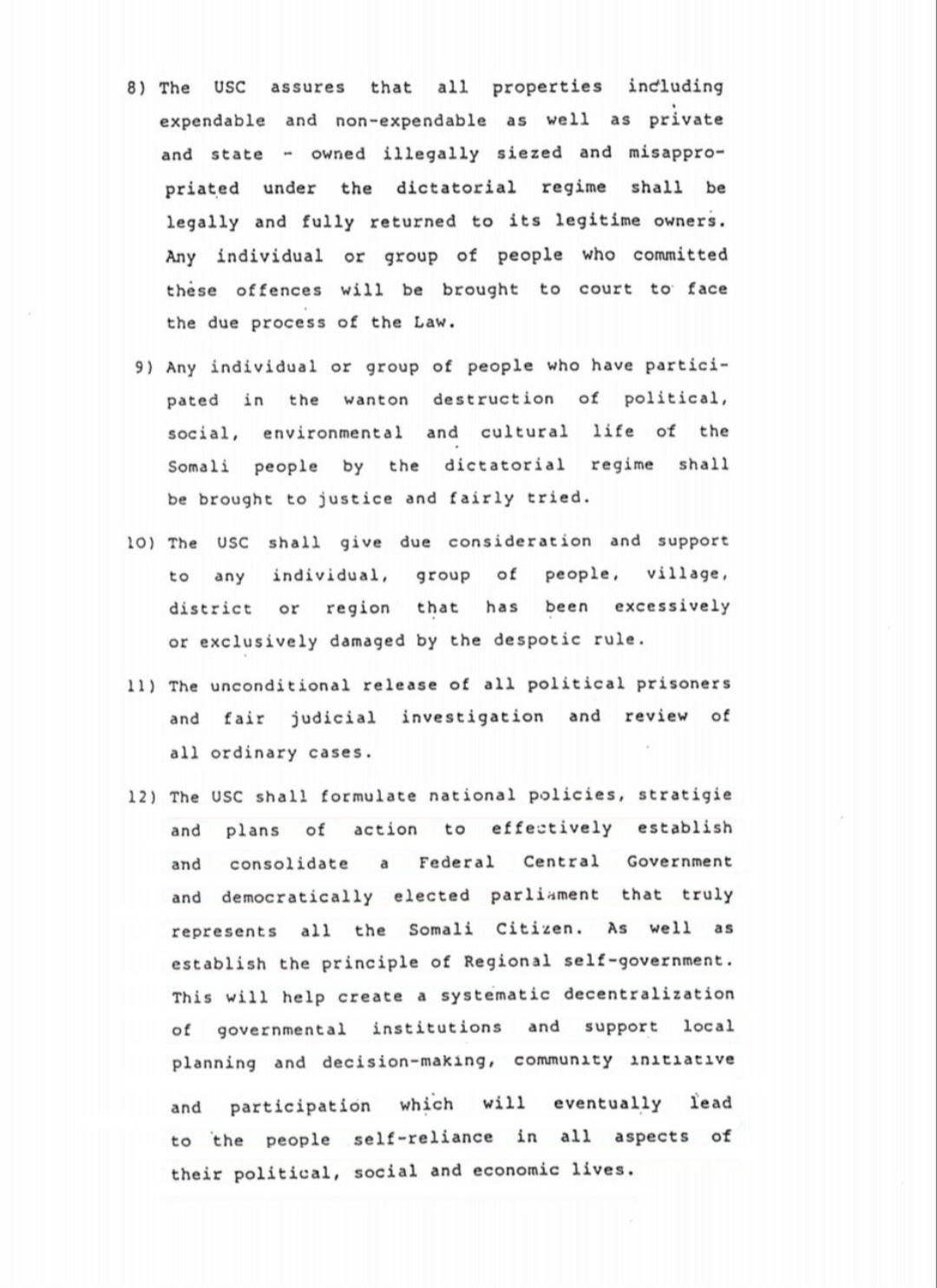
USC 1990 Political Programme

By the late 1980s, Barre's regime had become increasingly unpopular. The State took an increasingly hard line, and insurgencies, encouraged by Ethiopia's communist Derg administration, sprang up across the country. Being a member of the Hawiye clan, a high ranking government official and an experienced soldier, Aidid was deemed a natural choice for helping lead the military campaign for the United Somali Congress against the regime, and he was soon persuaded to leave New Delhi and return to Somalia.

=== Formation ===
With its base centered on the Hawiye clan, the United Somali Congress was established in Rome on 7 January 1989 by Ali Mohamed Osoble (Ali Wardhigley), who served as the vice-president of the Isaaq-led Somali National Movement (SNM) from 1984 to 1987. The USC copied the organisational structure and mobilisation patterns of the SNM, and throughout the remainder of the war, the SNM would airlift and provide the USC with critical arms and ammunition, which the USC could ill-afford.

Although its members largely started off as associates of SODAF, SSDF and SNM, the USC in Rome had its own political program that offered a decentralised system to address the growing discontent with central rule after 10 years of rebel opposition.

"The USC shall formulate national policies, strategy and plans of action to effectively establish and consolidate a Federal Central Government and a democratically elected parliament that truly represents all the Somali citizen. As well as establish the principle of regional self government. This will help create a systematic decentralisation of governmental institutions and support local planning and decision-making, community initiative and participation which will eventually lead to the people self-reliance in all aspects of their political, social and economic lives"

The USC military wing was formed in late 1989 in Mustahil, a native Hawiye area of Ethiopia, and led by General Mohamed Farrah Aidid until his demise in 1996. Being a member of the Hawiye clan, a high ranking government official and an experienced soldier, Aidid was deemed a natural choice for helping lead the military campaign for the United Somali Congress against the regime, and he was soon persuaded to leave New Delhi ambassadorship position and return to Somalia to participate in he Somali Rebellion.

=== Somali Civil War and collapse of Barre regime ===
Following Aidids defection, he had received an invitation from Ethiopian President Mengistu Haile-Mariam, who gave Aidid permission to create and run a USC military operation from Ethiopian soil. From base camps near the Somali-Ethiopian border, he began directing the final military offensive of the newly formed United Somali Congress to seize Mogadishu and topple the regime.

The USC was at that time split into three factions: USC-Rome, USC-Mogadishu, later followed by USC-Ethiopia; as neither the first two former locations were a suitable launching pad to topple the Barre regime. Ali Mahdi Mohamed, an influential member of the congress who would later become Aidid's prime rival, opposed Aidid's involvement in the USC and supported the Rome faction of the Congress, who also resented Aidid. The first serious signs of fractures within the USC came in June 1990, when Mahdi and the USC-Rome faction rejected the election of Aidid to chairman of the USC, disputing the validity of the vote.

That same month Aidid would go on to form a military alliance with the northern Somali National Movement (SNM) and the Somali Patriotic Movement (SPM). In October 1990, the SNM, SPM and USC would sign an agreement to hold no peace talks until the complete and total overthrow of the Barre regime. They further agreed to form a provisional government following Barres removal, and then to hold elections.

By November 1990, the news of Gen. Aidid's USC forces overrunning President Siad Barres 21st army in the Mudug, Galgudud and Hiran regions convinced many that a war in Mogadishu was imminent, leading the civilian population of the city to begin rapidly arming itself. This, combined with actions of other rebel organizations, eventually led to the full outbreak of the Somali civil war, the gradual breakup of the Somali Armed Forces, and the toppling of the Barre regime in Mogadishu on 26 January 1991. Following the power vacuum left by the fall of Barre, the situation in Somalia began to rapidly spiral out of control, and rebel factions subsequently began to fight for control of the remnants of the Somali state. Most notably, the split between the two main factions of the United Somali Congress (USC), led by Aidid and his rival Ali Mahdi, would result in serious fighting and vast swathes of Mogadishu would consequently destroyed as both factions attempted to exert control over the city.

Both Ali Mahdi and Aidid claimed to lead national unity governments, and each vied to lead the reconstruction of the Somali state.

Military successes by the USC would be instrumental in bringing about the ouster of the Barre government on January the 26th 1991, with the ruler fleeing into exile in Kenya. Despite the Kenyan Government militarily supporting Barre in his fight with the USC before and after his overthrow, the USC pursued Barre's forces into Kenya causing a long diplomatic and military row with President Daniel Arap Moi before he was offered by the then-OAU to retire in Lagos, Nigeria. Despite the victory however, the USC had failed to manage a political settlement with its rivals, the SNM, SPM and the SSDF, and also fragmented within its own leadership after Ali Mahdi Muhammad was declared interim President.

=== Aidid-Ali Mahdi split ===
Both Ali Mahdi and Aidid claimed to lead national unity governments, and each vied to lead the reconstruction of the Somali state.

Upon the naming of Ali Mahdi Muhammed as President, the USC split into two. The USC/SNA emerged under Mohammed Aidid and the United Somali Congress/Somali Salvation Alliance (USC/SSA) of Ali Mahdi Muhammed. The USC/SNA came under the control of Mohamed Aidid's son, Hussein Mohamed Farah Aidid after the father's death in 1996. The USC/SSA eventually came under control of the Deputy Chairman, Musa Sudi Yalahow.

Both USC factions made peace with each other in June 1997, though this caused a violent split between Yalahow and Ali Mahdi Muhammed, and fighting continued in Mogadishu. Eventually, both Hussein Aidid and Yalahow reconciled and joined the Somalia Reconciliation and Restoration Council (SRRC) in 2002, in opposition to the Transitional National Government (TNG). This caused a rift between the USC/SSA supporters of Yalahow and Omar Muhamoud Finnish (also known as Mahmud Muhammad Finish), who continued to support the TNG. Fighting between the two caused many deaths in Mogadishu.

In 2001, Hussein Aidid founded the Somalia Reconciliation and Restoration Council (SRRC), a new armed opposition group. Growing out of the Somali National Alliance, it was originally formed to oppose the nascent Transitional National Government (TNG) and the Juba Valley Alliance (JVA) in the 2001–2004 period. However, it eventually settled its differences with the government in 2003, with some moderate leaders incorporated into the new interim administration.

== Notable personnel ==
- Ali Mohamed Osoble ( Ali Wardhigley )
- Mohamed Farrah Aidid
- Ali Mahdi Muhammad
- Osman Hashi Rage (Faroole)
- Mohamed Afrah Qanyare
- Musa Nur Amin
- Musa Sudi Yalahow
- Omar Muhamoud Finnish

== Timeline of the USC ==
- 1987–1991 USC foundation to the overthrow of Siad Barre
- 1991–1992 Mohammed Aidid (USC Aidid) vs. Ali Mahdi Mohammed (USC Mahdi) until the foundation of the USC/SNA
- 1992–1995 USC/SNA and USC/SSA vs the UN intervention
- 1995–1998 USC/SNA vs. USC/SSA after the UN departure until the reconciliation
- 1998–2001 USC/SSA infighting between Ali Mahdi Mohammed and Musa Sudi Yalahow
- 2001–2002 USC/SSA infighting between Musa Sudi Yalahow (SRRC) vs. Omar Muhamoud Finnish (TNG)
- 2003–Several USC commanders disarm their militia; some incorporated into nascent interim government

== See also ==
- Politics of Somalia
- Somali Civil War
- Factions in the Somali Civil War
