= Ali Mahdi Muhammad =

President of Somalia from 1991 to 2000

- علي مهدي محمد
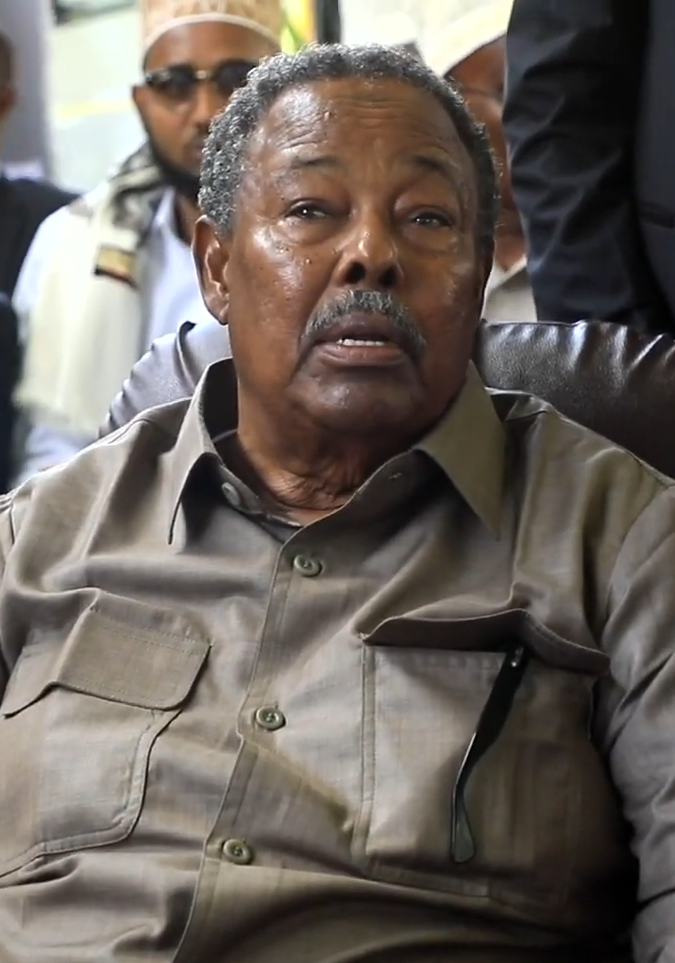
- Muhammad in 2020

4th President of Somalia
- In office 26 January 1991 – 27 August 2000
- Vice President: Abdulkadir Aden; Omar Moallim
- Preceded by: Mohamed Siad Barre
- Succeeded by: Abdiqasim Salad Hassan

Personal details
- Born: 1 January 1939 Jowhar, Somalia Governorate, Italian East Africa (modern-day Somalia)
- Died: 10 March 2021 (aged 82) Nairobi, Kenya
- Party: United Somali Congress

Ali Mahdi Muhammad (Somali: Cali Mahdi Maxamed, Arabic: علي مهدي محمد) (1 January 1939 – 10 March 2021) was a Somali entrepreneur and politician. He served as President of Somalia from 26 January 1991 to 27 August 2000. The Cairo Agreement in December 1997 designated Ali Mahdi as president once again, a position he held until being succeeded by Abdiqasim Salad in the year 2000.

Muhammad rose to power after a coalition of armed opposition groups, including his own United Somali Congress, deposed longtime dictator Siad Barre. However, Muhammad was not able to exert his authority beyond parts of the capital, and instead vied for power with other faction leaders in the southern half of the country and with autonomous subnational entities in the north.

Ali Mahdi was the primary rival of General Muhammad Farah Aidid, as both claimed to lead national unity governments, and each vied to lead the reconstruction of the Somali state.

== Early life ==
Muhammad was born in 1939, in Jowhar, an agricultural town in the southern Middle Shabelle region of Somalia (then a colony of Italy known as Italian Somaliland). His family hails from the Hawiye clan (Harti Abgaal Agoonyar).

== Career ==
=== United Somali Congress ===
Muhammad began his career in business, working as an independent Mogadishu-based entrepreneur and first entered politics in 1968, competing for a parliamentary seat in Mogadishu. After fallout from the unsuccessful Ogaden campaign of the late 1970s, the Siad Barre administration began arresting government and military officials under suspicion of participation in the abortive 1978 coup d'état. Most of the people who had allegedly helped plot the putsch were summarily executed. However, several officials managed to escape abroad and started to form the first of various dissident groups dedicated to ousting Barre's regime by force.

By the late 1980s, Barre's regime had grown considerably unpopular. The authorities became increasingly totalitarian, and resistance movements, supported by Ethiopia's communist Derg administration, sprang up across the country.

==== Mahdi—Aidid conflict ====
General Mohamed Farah Aidid was chosen to lead the military campaign for the United Somali Congress against the regime, and he was soon persuaded to leave New Delhi and return to Somalia. At the time, the USC was effectively divided into three regional factions: USC-Rome, USC-Mogadishu, and later USC-Ethiopia. Ali Mahdi, who later became Aidid’s main rival, opposed his involvement and backed the Rome faction, which also resented Aidid. The first major USC split emerged in June 1990 when Mahdi and the Rome faction rejected Aidid’s election as chairman, disputing the vote’s validity. From base camps near the Somali-Ethiopian border, Aidid began directing the final military offensive of the newly formed United Somali Congress to seize Mogadishu and topple the regime. By November 1990, Aidid’s USC forces had overrun Barre’s 21st Army in the regions of Mudug, Galgudud, and Hiran, signaling an imminent war in Mogadishu.

Eventually came the full outbreak of the Somali civil war, the gradual breakup of the Somali Armed Forces, and the toppling of the Barre regime in Mogadishu on 26 January 1991. Following the power vacuum left by the fall of Barre, the situation in Somalia began to rapidly spiral out of control, and rebel factions subsequently began to fight for control of the remnants of the Somali state. Most notably, the split between the two main factions of the United Somali Congress (USC), led by Aidid and his rival Ali Mahdi, would result in serious fighting and significant swathes of Mogadishu would consequently destroyed as both factions attempted to exert control over the city.

Both Ali Mahdi and Aidid claimed to lead national unity governments, and each vied to lead the reconstruction of the Somali state.

=== Interim presidency and UN intervention ===
In 1991, a multi-phased international conference on Somalia was held in neighbouring Djibouti. Aidid boycotted the first meeting in protest. Due to the legitimacy conferred on Muhammad by the Djibouti conference, he was subsequently recognized by the international community as the new President of Somalia. Djibouti, Egypt, Saudi Arabia, and Italy were among the countries that officially extended recognition to Muhammad's administration. However, Mahdi was not able to exert his authority beyond parts of the capital, and instead vied for power with other faction leaders in the southern half of the country and with autonomous subnational entities in the north. The competition for influence and resources between Muhammad and Aidid continued on through the 1992–95 United Nations missions to Somalia (UNOSOM I, UNOSOM II, and UNITAF), until Aidid's eventual death in 1996.

During the 1992 famine, law enforcement services across Somalia collapsed, looters—some of whom were linked to both Ali Mahdi and Aidid’s now demobilized rebel forces—raided supply routes and storage sites. Following the rout of former President Barres forces, Mahdi and Aidid, lacking funds and a unifying military threat, struggled to control their younger fighters, some of whom turned to food theft for survival. As security deteriorated, UNOSOM I was established in April 1992 under Mohamed Sahnoun to facilitate humanitarian aid delivery. The shift to more aggressive UNOSOM II mission during 1993 raised suspicions among a wide spectrum of Somalis about the intentions of foreign troops. Concerns were voiced about the UN's possible attempts to reestablish a trusteeship. While Aidid's faction was particularly vocal about these apprehensions, Ali Mahdi also expressed similar concerns. The Bloody Monday raid of 12 July 1993 carried out in Mogadishu by American troops elicited such a strong reaction from the Somali public that even Ali Mahdi's forces began displaying open contempt for UNOSOM forces.

In 2000, Muhammad participated in another conference in Djibouti, where he lost a re-election bid to Barre's former Interior Minister Abdiqasim Salad Hassan. Muhammad gave a concession speech, indicating that he respected the outcome of the election and would support and work with the new President-elect.

== Death ==
Ali Mahdi Muhammad died on 10 March 2021, in Nairobi, Kenya, after contracting COVID-19 during the COVID-19 pandemic in Kenya.

Political offices
| Preceded by Muhammad Siad Barre | President of Somalia; 1991–1997; 1997–2000 | Succeeded by Vacant - post next held by Abdiqasim Salad Hassan |
