= Ismail Ali Abokor =

Somali Politician and Major General

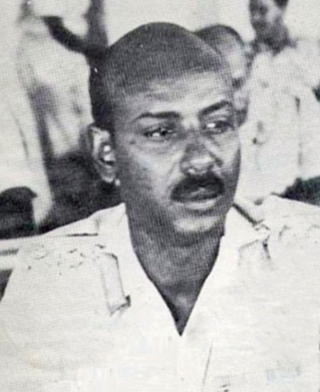

5th Speaker of the People's Assembly
- In office 1 November 1979 – 26 January 1982
- Succeeded by: Mohamed Ibrahim Liqliiqato

Third Vice President of Somalia
- In office 1971 – October 1982
- President: Mohamed Siad Barre

Personal details
- Born: 1937 (age 88–89) Burao, British Somaliland (now Republic of Somaliland)
- Party: Supreme Revolutionary Council

Military service
- Rank: Brigadier General

Ismail Ali Abokor (Somali: Ismaaciil Cali Abokor; born 1937) is a former Somali Politician and Major General. A senior member of the Supreme Revolutionary Council, He also served as Vice President of Somalia in the era of Siad Barre between 1971 and 1982. He was also a Speaker of the People's Assembly 1979 – 1982.

== Early life and education ==
Abokor was born in 1937 in Burao, now Somaliland. After completing his secondary education, he traveled to England for military training. He graduated from the Royal Military Academy Sandhurst.

== Career ==
=== Early career ===
Ismail Ali Abokor returned to Somalia in 1960 as one of the first officers to train for British Somaliland. In 1961, Abokor became deputy commander of the officers training school.

In 1962, he served as the head of the Somali National Army Barue, and in 1963 was named as a deputy commander of a battalion stationed in Kismayo. In 1965, he trained in Mogadishu, and after that he was appointed a commander of a battalion in Kismayo, and was promoted to a rank of lieutenant.

In 1967 he became Chief of trainers at Halane training school, known as "Bootiko".

=== Somali Democratic Republic ===
Ismail Ali Abukar served in the Somali National Army. In the rank of lieutenant colonel participated in the coup d'état of October 21, 1969, which led to the rule of General Mohammed Siad Barre, and became a member of the Supreme Revolutionary Council of the Somali Democratic Republic.

He held the post of one of the vice-presidents of the Somali Democratic Republic, received the rank of colonel. In November 1971 he visited the USSR. He was one of the key figures of the regime of Siad Barre, he held the rank of brigadier general and in 1971 he was appointed one of the Vice President of Somalia. He also held the post of minister of information and national guidance from 1971 to 1973. Since July 1976 (from the date of founding the party) he became a member of the Central Committee and a member of the Politburo of the Somali Revolutionary Socialist Party.

== Defection ==
After falling out with Barre, he was imprisoned in 1982 and subsequently released in 1988, after which he defected to the Somali National Movement based in what was then northern Somalia. He later moved to United Arab Emirates.
