= President of Somalia =

Head of state

President of the Federal Republic of Somalia
- Madaxaweynaha Jamhuuriyadda Federaalka Soomaaliyeed
- Presidential Seal

- Flag of Somalia

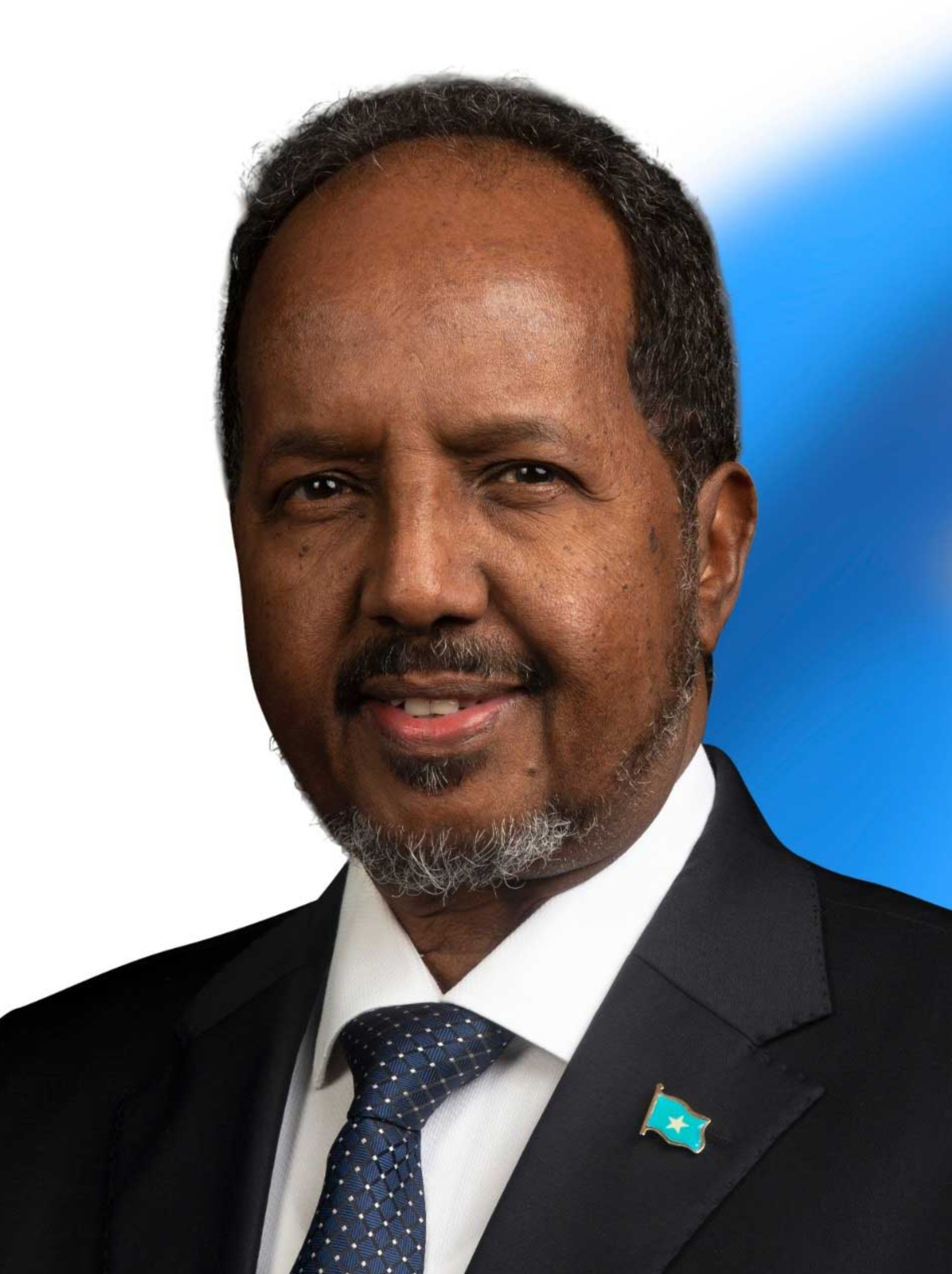
- Incumbent; Hassan Sheikh Mohamud; Disputed (Note: The presidency has been disputed since 15 May 2026, with Hassan Sheikh Mohamud asserting that the constitutional amendments passed on 30 March 2024 means that he continues to be the legitimate president until 15 May 2027. The opposition dispute the constitutional amendments as being invalid, stating that the constitutional term of Mohamud expired on 15 May 2026 in accordance with the provisional constitution of Somalia.) since 23 May 2022
- Style: Mr President (informal); His Excellency (diplomatic)
- Type: Head of state; Head of Executive; Commander-in-chief
- Abbreviation: POTFROS, POS
- Member of: National security council National Economic Council
- Residence: Villa Somalia
- Seat: Mogadishu
- Appointer: Federal Parliament of Somalia
- Term length: Four years
- Constituting instrument: Constitution of Somalia (2012)
- Formation: 1 July 1960; 66 years ago
- First holder: Aden Abdullah Osman Daar
- Salary: US$250,000 annually (2023)
- Website: villasomalia.gov.so

The president of Somalia (Somali: Madaxaweynaha Soomaaliya) is the head of state of Somalia. The president is also commander-in-chief of the Somali Armed Forces. The president represents the Federal Republic of Somalia, and the unity of the Somali nation, as well as ensuring the implementation of the Constitution of Somalia and the organised and harmonious functioning of the organs of state. Currently, the president of Somalia is indirectly elected, chosen by the Federal Parliament of Somalia.

The office of the President of Somalia was established with the proclamation of the Republic of Somalia on 1 July 1960. The first president was Aden Abdullah Osman Daar, and the office is currently claimed by Hassan Sheikh Mohamud despite the assertions of the opposition that his term has expired.

== History ==
The first president of Somalia was Aden Abdullah Osman Daar, one of the leaders of the Somali Youth League (SYL), who took office on 1 July 1960, the day on which Somalia was declared a republic. Since then the office has been held by eight further people: Abdirashid Ali Shermarke, Mohamed Siad Barre, Ali Mahdi, Abdiqasim Salad, Abdullahi Yusuf, Sharif Sheikh Ahmed, Mohamed Abdullahi Farmaajo, and Hassan Sheikh Mohamud. In addition, Sheikh Mukhtar acted as president between Shemarke's assassination and the coup d'état, and Aden Madoobe acted as president after Yusuf's resignation in 2008.

Sharif Sheikh Ahmed took office on 31 January 2009, after being elected by the presidential election held in January 2009. Ahmed's term as President of Somalia officially ended In August 2012, concurrent with the conclusion of the transitional federal government's mandate and the start of the federal government of Somalia. He was succeeded in office by General Muse Hassan, who had been serving in an interim capacity.

President Hassan Sheikh Mohamud took office on 16 September 2012, after being elected by the presidential election held on 10 September 2012.

== Qualifications and election ==
To become the president of Somalia, the candidate must:

(a) Be a Somali citizen and a Muslim;

(b) Be not less than forty years of age;

(c) Have relevant knowledge or experience for the role;

(d) Be sound of mind; and

(e) Not have been convicted by a court of a major crime.

The election of the president must begin at least 30 days before the incumbent president's term expires or 10 days after the presidency falls vacant and must be completed within 30 days of the beginning of the election. Candidates must be declared to the parliament's bureau within the first 10 days of this period, and elections must be completed within the remaining 20 days.

Formerly, the president was elected by the members of the Somali Parliament, requirements, and who are eligible to become members of Parliament.

== Term of office ==
The president is selected for a term of office of four years. As of 2021, there are no term limits for the president in the Constitution of Somalia. The term of office of the incumbent president continues until the president-elect takes office. On assuming office, the president takes the following oath before the parliament;

I swear in the name of Allah that I will perform my duties honestly and in the best interest of the Nation, People, and Religion and that I will abide by the Constitution and the other Laws of the Country.

== Duties and responsibilities ==
An outline of the duties is as follows:

- Appoint the prime minister,
- Serve as Commander-in-Chief of the Somali Armed Forces;
- Declare a state of emergency and war under the law,
- Appoint and dismiss the commanders of the forces at the federal government level on the recommendation by the Council of Ministers;
- Dismiss ministers, state ministers and deputy ministers on the recommendation of the prime minister;
- Sign draft laws passed by the federal Parliament to bring them into law;
- Open the House of the People of the Federal Parliament;
- Hold an annual session with the House of the People of the Federal Parliament;
- Appoint the chairman of the Constitutional Court, the High Court, and other judges at the federal government level following the recommendation of the Judicial Service Commission;
- Appoint senior federal government officials and the heads of the federal government institutions on the recommendation of the Council of Ministers;
- Appoint ambassadors and high commissions on the recommendation of the Council of Ministers;
- Receive foreign diplomats and consuls;
- Confer state honours on the recommendation of the Council of Ministers;
- Dissolve the House of the People of the Federal Parliament when its term expires, thereby prompting new elections;
- Pardon offenders and commute sentences on the recommendation of the Judicial Service Commission; and
- Sign international treaties proposed by the Council of Ministers and approved by the House of the People of the Federal Parliament.

== See also ==
- Politics of Somalia
- Prime Minister of Somalia
- Vice President of Somalia
