= Siad Barre =

President of Somalia from 1969 to 1991

Jaalle Major General Siad Barre
- Maxamed Siyaad Barre محمد زياد بري 𐒑𐒖𐒄𐒖𐒑𐒗𐒆 𐒈𐒘𐒕𐒛𐒆 𐒁𐒖𐒇𐒇𐒗
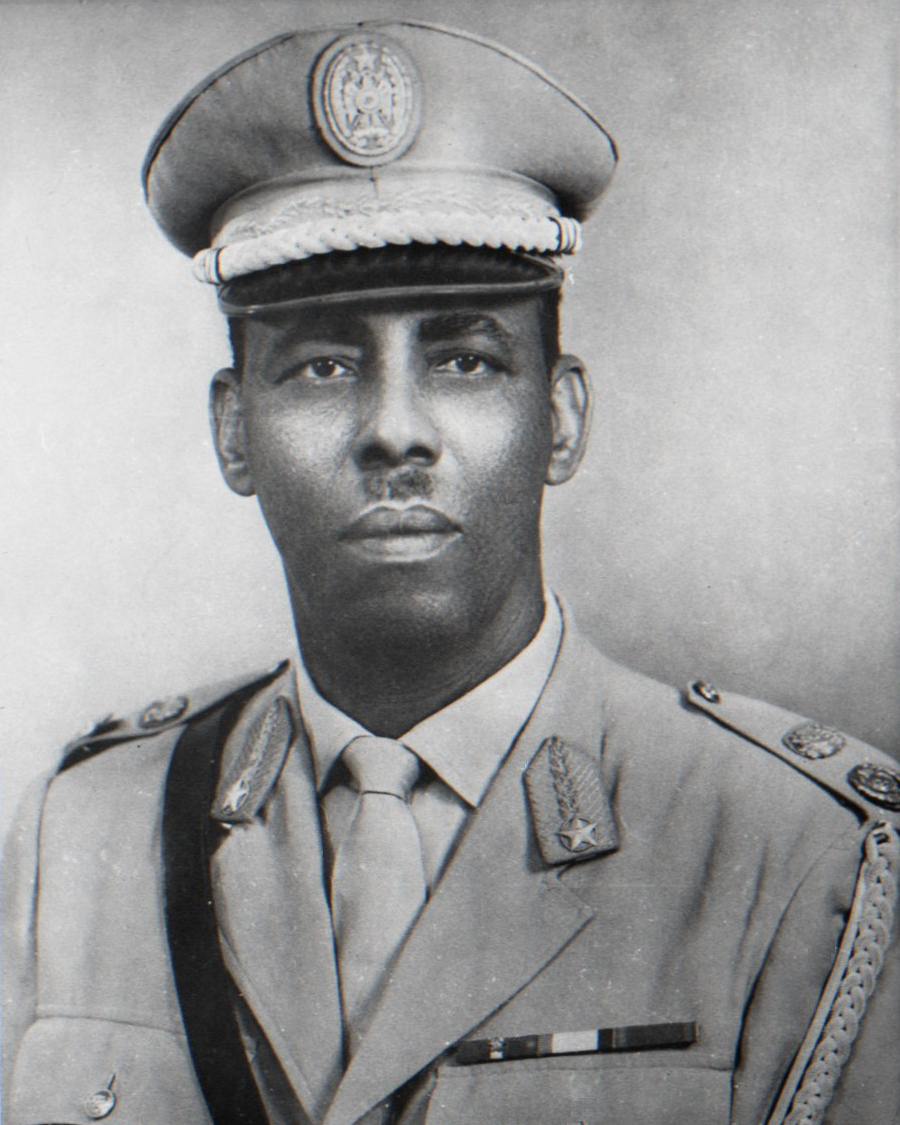
- Official portrait, c. 1970

3rd President of Somalia
- In office 21 October 1969 – 26 January 1991
- Vice President: Jama Ali Korshel; Mohamed Ainanshe; Ali Samatar; Hussein Afrah; Ismail Abokor
- Preceded by: Abdirashid Shermarke; Mukhtar Mohamed Hussein (acting)
- Succeeded by: Ali Mahdi Muhammad

General Secretary of the Somali Revolutionary Socialist Party
- In office 26 June 1976 – 26 January 1991
- Preceded by: Office established
- Succeeded by: Office abolished

Chairman of the Somali Revolutionary Council
- In office 21 October 1969 – 1 July 1976
- Preceded by: Office established
- Succeeded by: Office abolished

12th Chairperson of the Organisation of African Unity
- In office 12 June 1974 – 28 July 1975
- Preceded by: Yakubu Gowon
- Succeeded by: Idi Amin

Supreme Commander-in-Chief of the Somali Armed Forces
- In office 21 October 1969 – 26 January 1991
- Preceded by: Office established
- Succeeded by: Office abolished

2nd Commander-in-Chief of the Somali National Army
- In office 20 April 1965 – 25 November 1969
- Preceded by: Daud Abdulle Hirsi
- Succeeded by: Mohammad Ali Samatar

1st Deputy Commander-in-Chief of the Somali National Army
- In office 12 April 1960 – 20 April 1965
- Preceded by: Office established
- Succeeded by: Mohamed Ainanshe Guled

Personal details
- Born: Mohammed Siad Barre c. 6 October 1919 Shilabo, Ethiopia
- Died: 2 January 1995 (aged 75) Lagos, Nigeria
- Cause of death: Heart attack
- Resting place: Garbaharey, Gedo, Somalia
- Party: Supreme Revolutionary Council (1969–1976); Somali Revolutionary Socialist Party (1976–1991)
- Spouses: Khadija Maalim; Dalayad Hajji Hashi; Fadumo Aw Muse; Falhado Gure; Mariam Hassan
- Relations: Abdirahman Jama Barre (cousin); Mohammed Said Hersi Morgan (son-in-law)
- Children: Maslah Mohammed Siad Barre; +28 others
- Parents: Siad Barre Abdulle Yussuf (father); Shaqlan Warfa (mother)
- Education: Military Academy of Modena

Military service
- Allegiance: Somali Republic (1960–1969); Somali Democratic Republic (1969–1991)
- Branch/service: Somali Police Force; Somali National Army
- Years of service: 1941–1992
- Rank: Major general
- Commands: Chief of Defence Force
- Battles/wars: Military coups in Somalia; 1969 Somali coup d'état; 1978 Somali coup attempt; Ethiopian–Somali conflict; 1964 Border War; Ogaden War; 1982 Border War; Somali Rebellion; Somali Civil War

Mohammed Siad Barre (/moʊˈhæmɪd siːˈɑːd ˈbɑːreɪ/; Somali: Maxamed Siyaad Barre; Arabic: محمد زياد بري; c. 6 October 1919 – 2 January 1995) was a Somali military officer, politician, and revolutionary who served as the third president of Somalia from 21 October 1969 to 26 January 1991.

Barre, the commander of the Somali National Army, became president of Somalia after the 1969 coup d'état that overthrew the Somali Republic following the assassination of President Abdirashid Shermarke. The Supreme Revolutionary Council military junta under Barre reconstituted Somalia as a one-party Marxist–Leninist communist state, renamed the country the Somali Democratic Republic and adopted scientific socialism. Barre spoke three languages, English, Somali and Italian.

Barre's early rule was characterised by attempts at widespread modernization, nationalization of banks and industry, promotion of cooperative farms, a new writing system for the Somali language, and anti-tribalism. In 1976, the Somali Revolutionary Socialist Party became the country's vanguard party. The following year Barre launched the Ogaden War against Ethiopia's Derg regime, supporting the Western Somali Liberation Front on a platform of Somali nationalism and pan-Somalism. Barre's popularity was highest during the seven months between September 1977 and March 1978 when Barre captured virtually the entirety of the Somali region. It declined from the late-1970s following Somalia's defeat in the Ogaden War, triggering the Somali Rebellion and severing ties with the Soviet Union. Somalia then allied itself with the Western powers and especially the United States for the remainder of the Cold War, although it maintained its Marxist–Leninist regime and also drew close to China.

Opposition grew in the 1980s and in 1991, Barre's government collapsed as the Somali Rebellion successfully ejected him from power, leading to the Somali Civil War and a massive power vacuum in its wake. Barre was forced into exile in Nigeria, where he died in 1995 on the way to the hospital after suffering a heart attack.

== Early years ==
Mohamed Siad Barre was born at a time when birth records were unknown in Somalia. Speculations have been cast upon his exact birth year ranging from 1909 to 1921; nevertheless, it is generally agreed that he was born to pastoral parents. His unofficial birthplace is said to be in Las Ga'al, which is a district of the El-Gab region, presently known as Shilabo in the Ogaden Region of Ethiopia. His official birthplace is recorded to be the city of Garbahare, which is a part of the provincial capital of the Gedo region of Somalia. Mohammed was born to a Marehan father and Ogaden mother of the greater Darod clan. The colonial powers prevented ethnic Somalis born outside the two protectorates (Italian and British) from conscribing into their respective territorial forces. By concealing his unofficial birthplace like many others, it enabled him to be eligible for the Italian colonial police force and military in Somalia.

Barre's father and brother died when he was ten years old as a result of a raid by the Habr Yunis in the early 20th century, and this event is posited by some scholars to have deeply affected him.

The Middle East monthly in their March 1991 issue stated:

Barre came from a humble background, deeply rooted in the Marehan sub-clan of the Darod. He had seen his father killed by Isaqs and the impression never left him. His clan straddled the British and Italian segments of Somalia, forming a minority in each. He was worried that the country could split in two and in either case, his clan, as a minority, would be shut out of power. He became an inspector of police and later went to Italy to attend a military academy. On his return, he rose through the ranks quickly to become Commander.

Author Mohamed Diiriye in his book Culture and Customs of Somalia, writes:

Many who knew Barre from his boyhood and during his stint in the colonial police under the Italians were not that surprised. Barre was not a normal person; he was a psychopath whose mercurial spirit vacillated between raving hatred in one moment and words of praise and reconciliation the next moment. He was said to have witnessed the murder of his own father when he was only ten years old during the turbulent year of 1921, when the clan conflicts instigated by Mohamed Abdulle Hassan were raging across the land.. Barre was reportedly forever after deeply marked by the murder of his father. He became sadistic..

In The History of Somalia Raphael Njoku says:

According to his biographers, at the tender age of 10, young Muhammad first witnessed the murder of his own father...The shock and impact of this life experience and the difficult circumstances of life as an orphan put a very deep scar in his psyche. It is from this difficult childhood that Barre developed a complex sense of cunning, sadism, insecurity, and vengeance. These behavioural traits were exacerbated and solidified under the Italian fascist colonial rule.

He was given the childhood nickname Barre, referring to extrovertedness. In 1941, Mohammed, aged twenty, joined the police force which was then under the authority of the British military, who occupied it since the initiation of World War II hostilities. Mohammed's career in the police force led him to the capital city, Mogadishu, to pursue his education both in the public and private sectors. In the 1940s he completed secondary school education. By 1950, when the British transferred their administration to Italy, Mohammed Siad had achieved the highest rank possible for an indigenous, that of chief police inspector. MIT professor Irving Kaplan writes that the Somali Gendarmerie successfully disarmed and brought a number of pro-Italian guerrilla groups under control.

=== Role in anti Italian SYL riots in Mogadishu ===
British colonial officials documented extensive SYL membership within the Somali Gendarmerie, with Lieutenant Colonel Thorne reporting that approximately 60% of the force belonged to the SYL. Other British officials similarly noted that the majority of Somali civil servants serving under the British administration were SYL members. This overlap between the security forces and the party would prove decisive during the 1948 Mogadishu riots.The BMA favored the employment of SYL members in both the civil service and the gendarmerie, and by 1948 the party’s identification with the BMA had become so close that holding an SYL party card was practically a prerequisite for government employment.

Tensions came to a head following the arrival of a United Nations fact-finding mission, when the SYL organised a large rally intended to demonstrate popular support for Somali independence. In response, Italian residents staged an unauthorised counter-demonstration, dispatching truckloads of pro-Italian supporters who drove into crowds of SYL demonstrators.

As violence escalated, Gendarmerie officers many of described as SYL members, did not remain neutral. Officers were seen firing on members of the pro-Italian Conferenza party, and fought alongside the SYL against Italian and pro-Italian demonstrators. The riots ultimately left 54 Italians and 14 pro-Italian supporters dead, the latter killed while attempting to shield the Italian demonstrators. In the aftermath, Italian officials held the Somali Gendarmerie directly responsible for the Italian killings.

The Somali Gendarmerie, which was supposed to secure public order, in many cases joined the rioters. Captain A. T. Bevan of the British South African Police, at that time serving in Mogadishu, reported that he saw a Gendarmerie askari ‘carrying a rifle and stopping to fire every now and again at a group of Conferenza supporters.

In 1952, he and several of his colleagues, including Hussein Kulmiye Afrah, Liiq-Liiqato, Shegow and Daud Abdulle, attended a military academy in Italy where he chiefly studied politics and administration. Between 1950 and 1960, Mohammed Siad heavily pursued studies in languages, ultimately mastering Italian, English and Swahili. After finishing his course he was promoted to the rank of second lieutenant. In 1955, a year after completing his course in Rome he was awarded he position of police chief and subsequently assigned to the capital city, Mogadishu. By 1958 he reached the rank of major whilst being the head of the security forces, including the executive director of the Italian police. He also eventually became vice-commander of the Somali Army when the country gained its independence in 1960 as the Somali Republic.

== Rise to power ==
=== Decline of the civilian government 1960-1969 ===
In 1959 elections were held to decide the first post independence Somali government. The election was however rigged against the Greater Somalia League party, which was an anti-Italian SYL splinter group. The CIA verified the rigging and cast doubt whether the 1960s Somali government was truly a representative of its people.

The rigging, if given wide public attention is likely to create adverse world opinion and raise serious doubts whether Somali Government is representative of people.

By the early 1960s, the Somali parliamentary system had begun to deteriorate visibly. In 1963, fighting broke out among members of parliament, and an assassination attempt was made against the governor of Galkayo the same year. A US Peace Corps volunteer serving in Somalia during this period recounted regular armed clashes between rival factions, including one incident in which ten people were killed and a separate three-hour shootout in Baidoa.

Corruption within the civilian government became increasingly difficult to conceal. By some accounts, the administration spent nearly five times the annual agriculture budget on land rovers to rig elections, a level of graft that was compared to New York’s notorious Tweed Ring of the 19th century and Capone. The government also earned a reputation for squandering foreign aid; one report described it as a “graveyard of aid schemes,” while the Los Angeles times noted that Somalia remained as impoverished as it had been at independence in 1960.

President Abdirashid Ali Shermarke acknowledged and could not ignore the scale of the problem, publicly attributing the country’s drought crises in part to the conduct of corrupt Somali MPs. General Siad Barre, then head of the armed forces, was similarly critical of the civilian government’s trajectory, telling The Times that its growing dependence on foreign aid was humiliating and fundamentally at odds with the goal of national self-reliance.

We cannot go hat in hand in search of funds because that will be humiliating and contrary to the principle of self-reliance to which the nation is committed. [...] The only sensible solution to the deficit problem is to tighten our belts and cut down on luxuries.

In 1968, then Prime Minister Egal attributed Somalia’s inability to respond to the ongoing drought to an empty national treasury, a claim he made in an interview with The New York Times. Contemporary accounts, however, attribute the depletion of state treasury funds in large part to Egal's own use of government money to secure parliamentary support ahead of the 1969 elections.

Egal, meanwhile, was later found to have distributed embezzled state funds to American nationals, including John Bainbridge, who was arrested and expelled from Somalia following the 1969 revolution. Egal himself was alleged to have embezzled approximately 3 million Somali shillings, equivalent to roughly $26 million today.

On the night of the coup, Egal was in the United States, where he had reportedly spent stolen government funds gambling Roulette in Las Vegas casinos. Prior to this, he had attended a cocktail party in Beverly Hills celebrating a Hollywood production filmed in Somalia starring William Holden. Following the assassination of President Abdirashid, Somali officials struggled to reach the Prime Minister; in the ensuing effort to locate him, the US-Somali Educated Embassy reportedly contacted the FBI for assistance.

=== Assassination of Abdirashid Ali Sharmarke ===
President Abdirashid Ali Shermarke’s earlier election campaign had been substantially funded by the Soviet Union and other communist states, and as Prime Minister he had been the first Somali leader to extend diplomatic recognition to the People’s Republic of China.

Concerned by this trajectory and by the broader prospect of a Soviet-aligned Greater Somalia, the CIA began infiltrating Somali government ministries during the 1960s as part of a wider pattern of Cold War covert action across the continent. Former National security staffer, Roger Morris writes that up to $200,000, were directed toward pro-Western Somali politicians in an effort to reshape the country’s foreign policy alignment, with covert support said to have facilitated Mohamed Ibrahim Egal's rise within the ruling Somali Youth League ahead of the 1967 elections.

Once in office, Egal moved to curtail the influence of the Soviet-trained SNA, dismissing thousands of its personnel, while correspondingly strengthening the American-trained Somali police force as a counterweight. This realignment contributed to friction between Egal and President Shermarke; rumors circulated that the two men were no longer on good terms, a rift that widened further when Egal attempted to transform Somalia into a one-party state on 3 October 1969.

Former U.S. official Roy Stacy, who served in Somalia during the 1960s, described it as ironic that Abdirashid's assassin had been trained in the United States. According to Stacy, the assassin participated in a U.S.-sponsored public safety program and received firearms training at a shooting range in Washington, D.C., where he learned precision marksmanship. Soviet state radio directly accused the CIA of orchestrating the assassination of Shermarke. In a broadcast, Radio Moscow declared that the gunman who shot and killed Sharmarke was acting on direct orders from the CIA.

Roy Stacy:

It was ironic that the man, who pulled the trigger on this assassination had been trained by the USA Public Safety Program. He learned how to shoot a gun at our pistol range here in Washington, DC, and apparently he learned to shoot straight.

Henry Kissinger, then United States National Security Advisor, concluded that the assassin acted independently. Abdirashid Shermarke, was assassinated in Las Anod in Northern Somalia on 15 October 1969. Shermarke had been visiting drought-stricken areas in the northeast when the assassin, Said Yusuf Ismail, shot and killed him. On 21 October 1969, at 3:00 a.m., Siad Barre and the military overthrew the parliamentary government of the existing Somali Republic. The assassin of former President Abdirashid Shermarke Ismail was tried, tortured, and executed by the Supreme Revolutionary Council. Notably, Ismail shared the same clan background as President Shermarke.

== Presidency ==
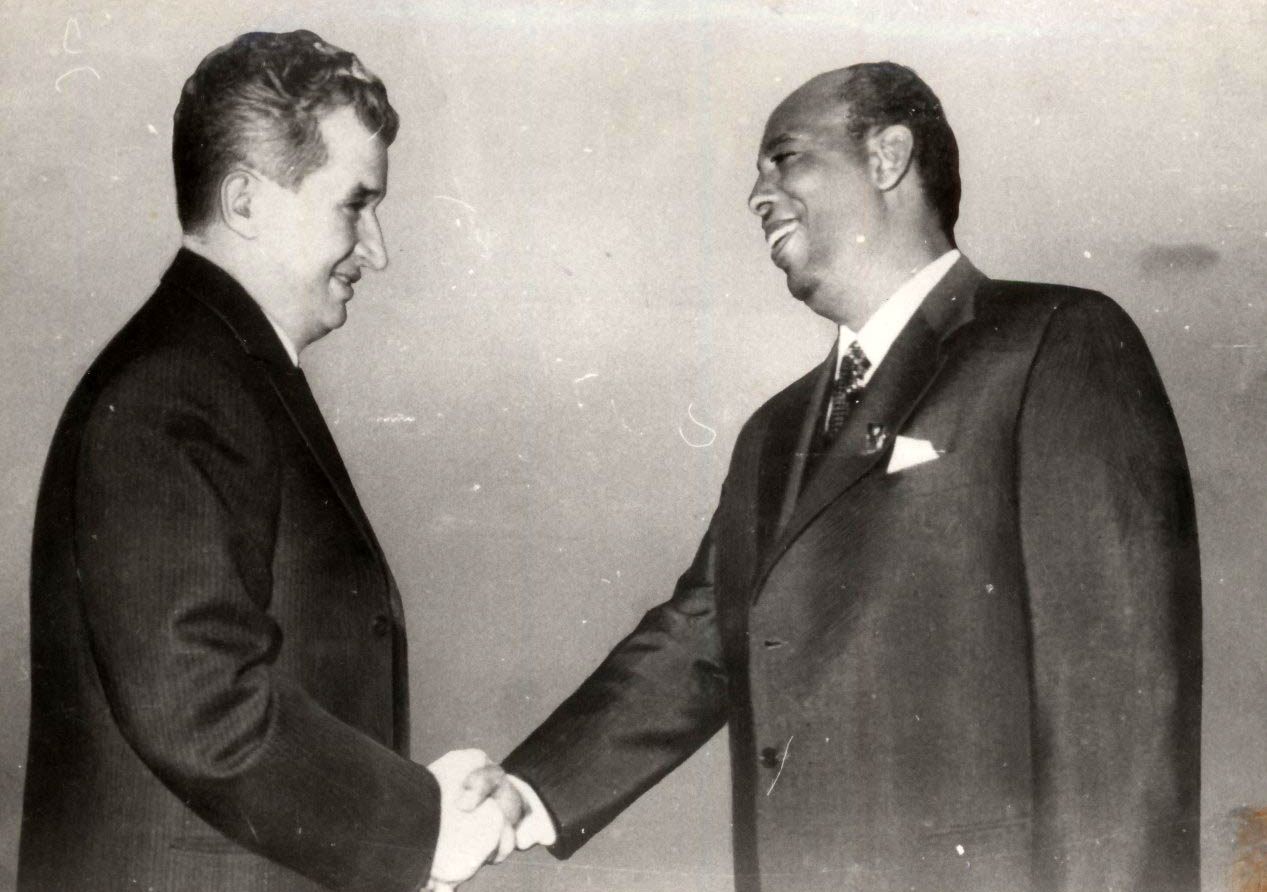
Barre with Romanian president Nicolae Ceaușescu in 1976

Barre assumed the position of president of Somalia, styled the "Victorious Leader" (Guulwade), and fostered the growth of a personality cult with portraits of him in the company of Marx and Lenin lining the streets on public occasions.

=== Supreme Revolutionary Council ===
The Supreme Revolutionary Council established large-scale public works programs and successfully implemented an urban and rural literacy campaign, which helped dramatically increase the literacy rate. Barre began a program of nationalising industry and land, and the new regime's foreign policy placed an emphasis on Somalia's traditional and religious links with the Arab world, eventually joining the Arab League in 1974. That same year, Barre also served as chairman of the Organization of African Unity (OAU), the predecessor of the African Union (AU).

In July 1976, Barre's SRC disbanded itself and established in its place the Somali Revolutionary Socialist Party (SRSP), a one-party government based on scientific socialism and Islamic tenets. The SRSP was an attempt to reconcile the official state ideology with the official state religion. Emphasis was placed on the Muslim principles of social progress, equality and justice, which the government argued formed the core of scientific socialism and its own accent on self-sufficiency, public participation and popular control, as well as direct ownership of the means of production. While the SRSP encouraged private investment on a limited scale, the administration's overall direction was proclaimed to be Socialist.A new constitution was promulgated in 1979 under which elections for a People's Assembly were held. However, the politburo of Barre's Somali Revolutionary Socialist Party continued to rule. In October 1980, the SRSP was disbanded, and the Supreme Revolutionary Council was re-established in its place.

=== Institutional state building ===
British Somaliland and Italian Somaliland had operated under two distinct colonial systems, in the south, Italian served as the language of instruction, while in the north, that role was filled by English. By establishing Somali as the official language of instruction in 1972, the post-1969 state took a significant step toward unifying the north and south and standardising its institutions. Complementing this political and linguistic unification, the Barre government in 1973 constructed highways linking the two regions, facilitating transport, trade, and broader economic development.

Scholars have since debated how this period of standardisation should be weighed against the fragmentation that preceded it. Dominik Balthasar has argued that the 1960s were in fact characterised by increasing social stratification along urban-rural, regional, and linguistic lines, with Somali society fracturing into what he terms a “semi-anarchy” of clan-based camps, a pattern he suggests reflects a pluralisation rather than a standardisation of governing rules during that decade.

Balthasar contends that Barre’s rule offers important lessons for state formation, proposing that the Barre era constituted the most promising period of institutional state-making in Somali history. He argues it was marked by growing institutional and identity standardisation — processes regarded as foundational to state and nation building. Balthasar cautions against attributing Somalia’s post-1991 collapse solely to the legacy of Barre, arguing that such an explanation is simplistic and overlooks the seeds of state fragility and social fragmentation already sown during the post-independence decade of the 1960s, and indeed during colonialism itself. British scholar Peter Woodward who specializes in African politics, characterized the 1960-1969 Somali republic as commercialized anarchy.

Blaming Somalia's post-1991 fate on the repercussions of Barre's dictatorial rule is not only simplistic, but glosses over the fact that already the post-independence decade of the 1960s entailed seeds of state fragility and social fragmentation sown, not least, during colonialism.

This fragmentation extended to state institutions themselves: a U.S. Peace Corps volunteer who worked closely with the pre-1969 government’s Ministry of Agriculture wrote in his memoir that the Somali ministry of agriculture was effectively a “non-virtual entity,” describing it as taking no meaningful interest in the advancement of Somali agriculture despite the presence of capable individuals who could have driven progress but showed little inclination to do so.

From my personal vantage point as a volunteer in the bush, the Ministry has proved to be a virtual nonentity—and a very poorly organized and inefficient non-entity at that. During my four months in Gorisane, for example, the local agriculture agent deigned to show up a total of three days, during which time his activity was limited to drinking tea in his pal's mundul.

Other scholars have offered more varied assessments of Barre’s broader political impact. Donatella Strangio has described Barre’s first decade in power as representing the rebirth of Somali nationalism, characterising him as a leader who brought innovation, overcame widespread clanism, and focused on the democratic, and popular culture of Somalia. Robert F. Gorman similarly concluded that Barre elicited a higher degree of societal cohesion in Somalia than had previously existed. This assessment was echoed even by President Jimmy Carter, in a diplomatic message conveyed to Barre, Carter recognised him as “a spokesman for democratic processes and freedom,” adding that there was “no doubt” he represented his nation well.

=== Economic policies ===
Siad Barre was critical of Italian colonial economic policy in Somalia, arguing that it had remained narrowly focused on banana cultivation and had failed to develop the territory’s economy beyond this single export, to the point that it undermined even Italy’s own long-term interests in the colony. This legacy left Somalia in a precarious position at independence: in 1960, its gross national product was among the lowest in Africa.

Among the many plaintive reproaches that Siad Barre used to address to Rome, one concerned the sphere of economic policy in Somalia. It did not see beyond bananas and beyond bananas it developed practically nothing. It was a colonialism that even did harm to its own interests.

Following the 1969 revolution, Barre's government pursued a significant expansion of the livestock sector. Somalia’s cattle population, estimated at one million in 1965, grew to approximately four million by 1975. Between 1970 and 1973, the government introduced a cattle-fattening program under which between 15,000 and 50,000 head of cattle were purchased for fattening, alongside an immunisation campaign that vaccinated roughly 800,000 cattle. A dairy processing plant built with foreign investment in 1965 had failed due to poor maintenance and government neglect, but was later refurbished, expanded, and reopened as the “21st October Dairy Farm.”

In 1976, Barre launched a state cattle-breeding program at the Afgoi, crossbreeding native cattle with foreign stock to develop animals better suited to Somalia’s harsh climate and capable of producing higher yields of milk and meat. These efforts contributed to a marked increase in livestock exports, which more than doubled in value to 295 million Somali shillings and quadrupled in volume compared with 1971.

Stanford-trained economist Vali Jamal estimated Somalia’s GDP per capita under Barre’s government at $406 in 1978 equivalent to roughly $2,000 today, noting that agricultural output had likely been significantly underestimated in official statistics. By this measure, Somalia’s per capita GDP surpassed that of several other African nations at the time, including Egypt, Ghana, Sudan, Tanzania, and Kenya, as well as most other East African states. Vali's GDP per capita adjustment accounts only for under reported milk production and does not include other sectors that were also underestimated. As a result, Somalia's GDP per capita was likely significantly higher than Vali's cited figure of approximately $400.

This assessment was corroborated by Somalia’s first official national accounts, prepared in 1979 through three independent efforts undertaken jointly with the Somali Central Statistical Department — two by the UN Economic Commission for Africa and one by the World Bank (IBRD). Where GDP per capita had conventionally been cited at around $100, the IBRD’s calculation placed the figure at $342, a result that put Somalia well out of the league of the least developed countries entirely. The report also estimated that 17 percent of the population fell below the poverty threshold a figure described as remarkably low compared with other African countries, vindicating the visual impression of a lack of abject poverty in urban Somalia, where shanty areas were rare and obvious signs of malnutrition rarer still.

=== Degree of corruption ===
Barre's economic record was also frequently linked to broader assessments of its comparatively low levels of corruption. While many scholars of military rule in Africa argued that military governments were often as corrupt as the civilian administrations they replaced, many identified Barre’s government as an exception to this pattern. One such assessment noted that there have been exceptions, such as the 1969 coup in Somalia, which brought to power almost puritanical officers who sharply reduced corruption. Experts on military African rule, Michael Tidy and Ali M Mazrui wrote in 1984 that corruption was no longer a major social problem in Somalia, attributing low levels of corruption to Islam and socialism.They also contended that members of the Somali military government had no appetite of personally enriching themselves.

This view was echoed in a 1975 investigative hearing before a U.S. Senate subcommittee, which identified Somalia as one of the least corrupt nations in Africa at the time, describing Barre’s government as having maintained a stable and effective administration for five years and noting his standing as a recognised leader who had recently completed a term as Chairman of the Organisation of African Unity.

This reputation for fiscal discipline stood in contrast to the corruption that had characterised the preceding civilian government: analysts had noted that financial mismanagement was so widespread under the pre-1969 government that it was unable to present a complete fiscal report due to irregularities within the administration. The national budget had run a deficit continuously since independence, Barre's government recorded Somalia’s first budget surplus in 1971, which was subsequently directed toward financing development projects.

=== Agricultural reforms ===
In the early 1970s, the CIA issued a special assessment of Somalia’s economy, describing the task facing the new government as a "Herculean task" given the country’s arid terrain, limited resources, and largely undeveloped economy, in which most of its 2.8 million people relied on nomadic herding and subsistence agriculture for their livelihood. The report attributed this difficult starting position in part to the civilian era’s development programs, which it characterised as inefficiently administered, having accomplished little beyond giving Somalia a reputation for squandering foreign aid.

Addressing the country’s resource constraints, the Barre government adopted seawater desalination technology developed in 1964 by Ukrainian-Israeli chemist Alexander Zarchin. This method, which removed salt particles from seawater, was adapted by Barre’s government in the early 1970s, leading to the construction of a desalination plant that expanded access to clean water and irrigation. Barre identified reducing the disparity between northern and southern Somalia as a central goal of his agricultural policy, alongside broader programs to combat overgrazing and boost food production. In 1973, government ministers were dispatched to Gabiley in north-western Somalia to instruct local communities on the importance and methods of improved food production.

These efforts contributed to substantial gains over the following decade: sorghum production rose 87 percent, from an average of 139,000 tons in the 1970s to 260,000 tons by 1985, while maize production increased 162 percent over the same period, from 107,000 tons to 280,000 tons, leaving Somalia largely self-sufficient in both crops. A UNICEF report from the period found that levels of absolute poverty and malnutrition in Somalia appeared markedly lower than in most other low-income sub-Saharan African economies, and noted no evidence of secular deterioration in these conditions over time.

Under Barre, Somalia achieved caloric self-sufficiency. The country reached a per capita calorie availability of more than 2,800 calories per day, with 69 percent of total calories supplied by domestically produced food. Agricultural productivity was notably high by African standards. Somali farmers could produce enough food to meet their own needs while generating a surplus to support one additional non-farming person. Although farmers made up only about one-third of the population, they produced enough surplus to sustain a substantial non-agricultural population.

Experts highlighted this as exceptional in Africa. In contrast, many other African countries at the time had agricultural sectors in which farmers constituted three-quarters or more of the population, yet their output frequently failed to adequately feed the remaining non-farming quarter of society.

In 1984, two Somali farmers managed to produce enough of a surplus to feed one non-farmer. While this may not seem enormous, the same cannot be said for many other African countries. The relevant point here is that in Somalia farmers comprise only around one-third of the total population whereas in most other African countries they form three-quarters or more. Those three-quarters have gradually lost their capacity to feed the remaining one-quarter non-farmers. In Somalia a much smaller farm population not only feeds itself but produces a surplus large enough to feed a sizeable part of the non-farm population. Thus if Somalia is food-deficient on the whole, and has to import food, it is not because the farmers fail to produce enough for themselves, but because the nomads who comprise the majority of the population fail to do so.

The government’s largest infrastructure undertaking in this period was the Fanole Dam, built with Chinese technical assistance. Construction began in 1977 and was completed in 1982; the project created thousands of jobs for Somalis and supplied electricity to southern Somalia.

=== Tax reforms ===
Barre’s government undertook a marked expansion of the state’s capacity to collect revenue, an achievement widely seen as symbolising a break from the administrative weakness of the civilian era. Whereas the previous government had struggled to enforce taxation even in urban centers. The post 1969 government extended tax collection into rural and nomadic bush areas, reaching rural communities in the bush that had largely fallen outside the state’s fiscal reach.This institutional strengthening corresponded in a rise in tax revenue. From 1970 onward, tax revenue doubled by 1975.

Former US peace corps volunteer in 1969 writes:

They've reclaimed a bunch of cars that the previous government had passed out to its friends, and they have begun to collect taxes in the bush. To a lot of people, they've definitely symbolized a shift from the previous corruption.

=== Education and Literacy programs ===
==== Civilian Era 1960-1969 ====
During the civilian government of Somalia (1960–1969), education received limited attention, resulting in Somalia's education system having the lowest standard in Africa. In 1968, a UNESCO inspection mission examined the education system in northern Somalia (the former British Somaliland). The mission reported that numerous schools suffered from poor cleanliness and inadequate maintenance, creating an uncomfortable environment for teachers and students.

In most cases, the general effect of the lack of maintenance is enhanced by a similar lack of cleanliness. Whether because there are not enough sweepers, or because they do not work properly, or because the responsible managers just do not care, the fact is that, in too many places, education takes place amid a general dirtiness.

==== Barre Era post 1969 ====
The Barre government initiated large-scale literacy programs in 1972, and successfully implemented an urban and rural literacy campaign, thus significantly increasing the literacy rate. By the end of the program, literacy rate in Somalia was estimated at 80%. In 1975 the Somali Ministry of education was awarded a UNESCO prize. According to a World Bank education survey on Somalia conducted in the 1970s, the expansion of education during this period was described as outstanding.

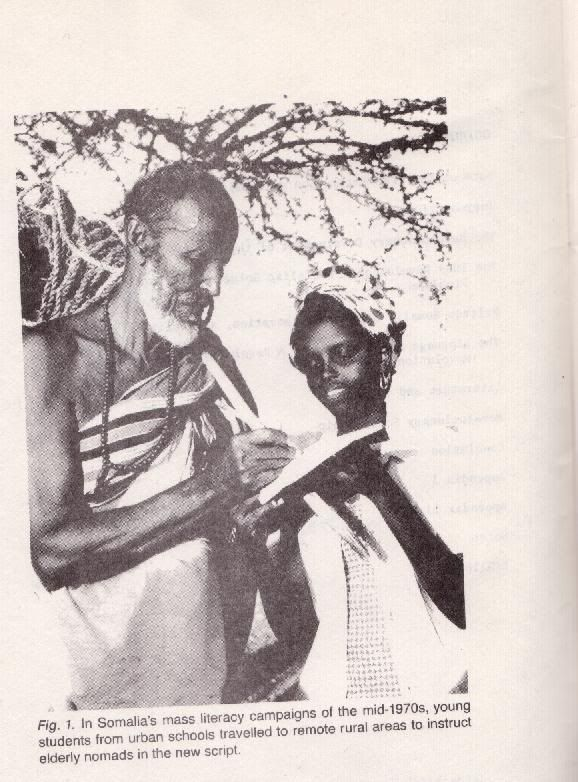
Rural Somali literacy program

Former US ambassador to Somalia praised Somali literacy efforts:

UNESCO reportedly examined this and found that when Somalis closed down the schools for two years and sent everybody to the field with chalk and blackboards and radio receivers, that they did, in a period of five years, go from a 12-16% literacy rate to an 86% literacy rate. The Somalis that I know, having been back four times since retirement, and having the privilege of traveling anywhere in the country, would say it certainly is well over 50%. Exactly how high it is, I have no way of judging. But I think it is one of the most remarkable achievements of any country in Africa.

UNESCO assessments at the time indicated that Ethiopia’s literacy efforts were less impressive than those in Somalia; the literacy rate in Ethiopia was recorded at a low of 3.5%. Following 1974, Kiflu Tadesse writes that Ethiopia copied literacy campaigns and related state-building measures of Siad Barre in Somalia.

=== Nationalism and Greater Somalia ===
Barre advocated the concept of a Greater Somalia (Soomaaliweyn), which refers to those regions in the Horn of Africa in which ethnic Somalis reside and have historically represented the predominant population, encompassing Somalia, Djibouti, the Ogaden in Ethiopia, and Kenya's former North Eastern Province.

In July 1977 the Ogaden War broke out over control of the Ogaden region after Barre's government sought to consolidate the various Somali-inhabited territories of the region into a Greater Somalia. The Somali National Army launched an invasion in support of the Western Somali Liberation Front (WSLF) insurgency against the Soviet-backed Derg, triggering a broader inter-state war. The intervention drew the disapproval of the Soviet Union, which subsequently withdrew its support for Somalia and backed Ethiopia instead. Ethiopia was saved from defeat and permanent loss of territory through a massive airlift of military supplies and the arrival of more than 12,000 Cuban soldiers and airmen and 1,500 Soviet advisors, led by General Vasily Petrov. The Ethiopian-Cuban force (equipped with 300 tanks, 156 artillery pieces and 46 combat aircraft) prevailed at Harar and Jijiga, and began pushing the Somalis out of the Ogaden. On 23 March 1978, the Ethiopian government declared that the last border post had been regained, thus ending the war.

=== Foreign relations ===
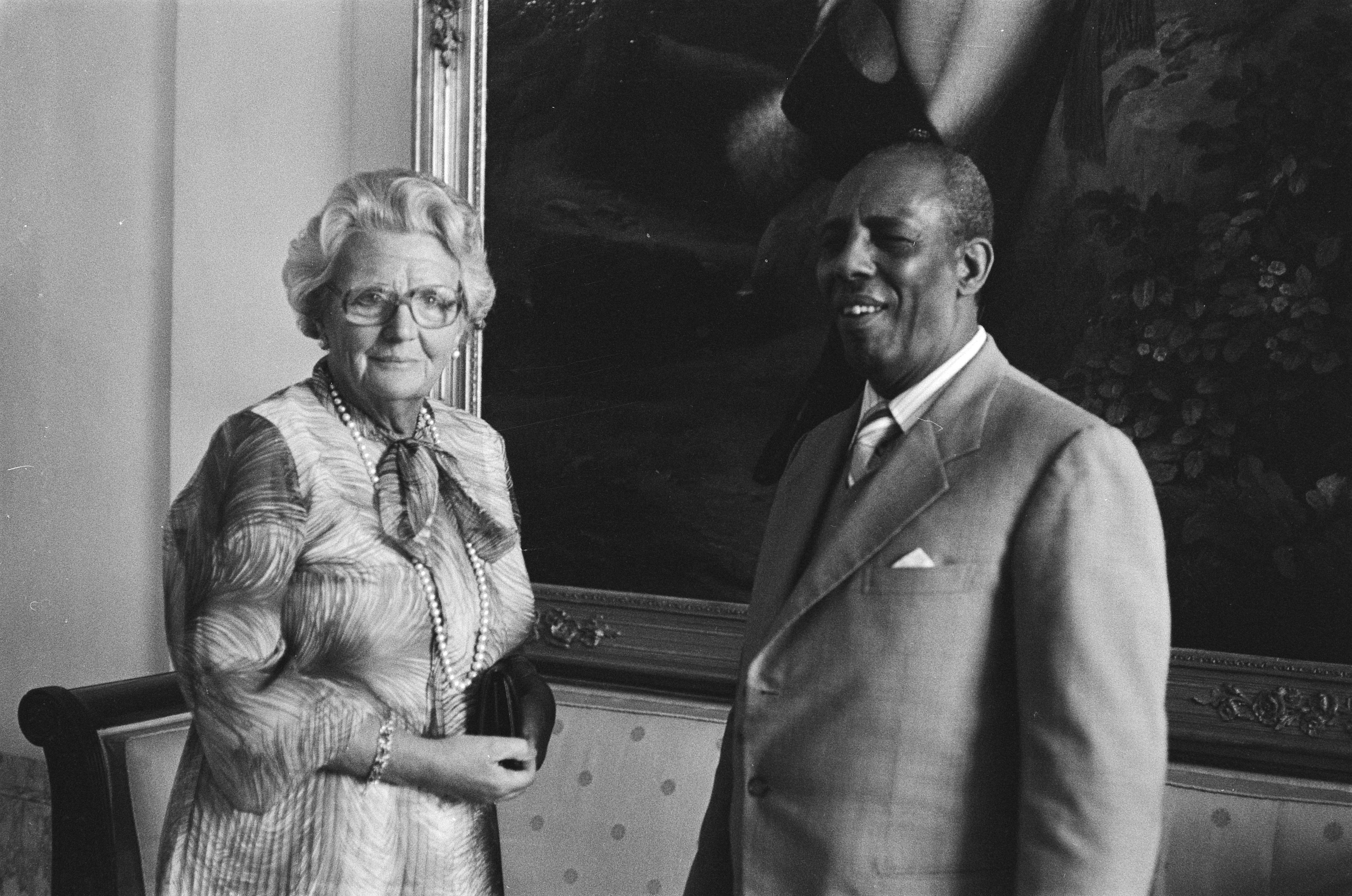
Barre and Queen Juliana in 1978

Control of Somalia was of great interest to both the Soviet Union and the United States due to the country's strategic location at the mouth of the Red Sea. After the Soviets broke with Somalia in the late 1970s, Barre subsequently expelled all Soviet advisors, tore up his friendship treaty with the Soviet Union, and switched allegiance to the West, announcing this in a televised speech in English. Somalia also broke all ties with the Eastern Bloc and the Second World (except China and Romania). The United States stepped in and until 1989, was a strong supporter of the Barre government for whom it provided approximately US$100 million per year in economic and military aid, meeting in 1982 with Ronald Reagan to announce the new relationship between the US and Somalia.

On 17 and 18 October 1977, a Popular Front for the Liberation of Palestine (PFLP) group hijacked Lufthansa Flight 181 to Mogadishu, holding 86 hostages. West German Chancellor Helmut Schmidt and Barre negotiated a deal to allow a GSG 9 anti-terrorist unit into Mogadishu to free the hostages.

=== Pan Africanism ===
Anthropologist Francis A.J. Ianni observed that many African leaders regarded Haile Selassie as having only recently discovered his own Black identity. During the 1970s, Siad Barre worked deliberately to cultivate Somalia’s international image and reposition the country as a leading voice within African liberation politics. A CIA assessment from the period noted that Barre was trying to improve his country’s African image in order to build support for Somalia’s territorial claims. The same assessment observed that Barre used his position as sitting Chairman of the OAU to overcome lingering doubts about Somalia’s African credentials.

To counter this perception, Barre undertook extensive diplomatic outreach, to fourteen West African countries to raise Somalia’s profile in a region where it was little known. Through this campaign, he sought to downplay Somalia’s close ties to the Soviet Union, build support for Djibouti independence.

At the 1974 OAU summit, Ugandan leader Idi Amin declared that all white colonial forces should be driven from South Africa and proposed that Barre should lead the march to Cape Town, an endorsement that reflected a growing perception of Barre as a figurehead in the broader African liberation struggle. In September 1972 Tanzanian-sponsored rebels attacked Uganda. Ugandan president Idi Amin requested Barre's assistance, and he subsequently mediated a non-aggression pact between Tanzania and Uganda. For his actions, a road in Kampala was named after Barre.

Tanzanian President Julius Nyerere offered a similar, if more measured, tribute at the same conference, remarking that he hoped he was not overstepping into Somalia’s internal affairs in observing how much Barre had done for the country. Barre’s standing was further reflected in a 1974 interview with the Black Panther movement in the United States, and political scientist Robert F. Gorman concluded that Barre had developed a reputation as one of the continent’s leading figures.

Somalia’s practical engagement in African liberation causes extended beyond rhetoric. In February 1977, Newsweek reported that Somali tanks were stationed in Mozambique, a deployment that prompted protest from Kenya’s foreign minister at the time.

=== Refugee crisis ===
The refugee situation that developed in Somalia was characterized as more severe than the Indochina refugee crisis, which had involved the displacement of three million people. For a time, Siad Barre’s government provided support to the Somali refugees without receiving international assistance. Despite the country’s dire situation, Somali authorities did not seek official help from abroad. Instead, the government shared its own limited food stocks, financial resources, and health services with the refugees.

A report by the U.S. Senate Foreign Relations Committee stated that the United Nations delayed response risked causing mass starvation among the Somali refugee population. They reported the outcome was averted only because the Somali government was willing to draw down its own food stocks to extremely low levels in order to keep the refugees alive. The Ethiopian government under the Derg deliberately provoked large-scale refugee movements into Somalia through its marxist villagization programme. Daily arrivals ranged from 2,000 to as many as 4,000 people. Over a six-month period, roughly 70,000 refugees entered Somalia. Many of the non-Somali refugees arrived carrying infectious diseases, which contributed to outbreaks within the refugee camps. Siad Barre blamed Ethiopia for weaponizing refugees. Making matters worse, the Soviet Union actively lobbied the UN against providing humanitarian aid to Somalia. In 1979 Soviet Union blocked an appeal for refugee assistance towards Somalia.

==== Accuracy of refugee figures ====
Peter Nobel, a relative of the founder of the Nobel Peace Prize, rejected and refuted claims made by Western diplomats questioning the accuracy of Somali refugee figures. He stated that Somalia maintained one of the most advanced and impressive refugee registration systems in Africa. Nobel reported that there was no evidence to suggest the statistical information on the refugee situation, which was continuously supplied by the Somali administration, was untrustworthy or incorrect. On the contrary, he found the precision and efficiency of the registration system in this developing country to be impressive. No representatives of any international organization or voluntary agency present on the ground expressed any distrust in the correctness of the numbers provided by the government

=== Domestic programs ===
A public project initiated by the government was the Shalanbood Sanddune Stoppage: from 1971 onwards, a massive tree-planting campaign on a nationwide scale was introduced by Barre's administration to halt the advance of thousands of acres of wind-driven sand dunes that threatened to engulf towns, roads, and farmland. By 1988, 265 hectares (650 acres) of a projected 336 ha (830 acres) had been treated, with 39 range reserve sites and 36 forestry plantation sites established.

=== Car collision ===
In May 1986, President Barre suffered serious injuries in a life-threatening automobile collision near Mogadishu, when the car that was transporting him smashed into the back of a bus during a heavy rainstorm. He was treated in a hospital in Saudi Arabia for head injuries, broken ribs and shock over a period of a month. Lieutenant General Mohammad Ali Samatar, then vice-president, subsequently served as de facto head of state for the next several months. Although Barre managed to recover enough to present himself as the sole presidential candidate for re-election over a term of seven years on 23 December 1986, his poor health and advanced age led to speculation about who would succeed him in power. Possible contenders included his son-in-law General Ahmed Suleiman Abdille, who was at the time the Minister of the Interior, in addition to Barre's vice-president Lt. Gen. Samatar.

=== Human rights abuses ===
In September 1970, the government introduced the National Security Law No. 54, which granted the NSS the power to arrest and detain indefinitely those who expressed critical views of the government, without ever being brought to trial. It further gave the NSS the power to arrest without a warrant anyone suspected of a crime involving "national security". Article 1 of the law prohibited "acts against the independence, unity or security of the State", and capital punishment was mandatory for anyone convicted of such acts.

From the late 1970s, and onwards Barre faced a shrinking popularity and increased domestic resistance. In response, Barre's elite unit, the Red Berets (Duub Cas), and the paramilitary unit called the Victory Pioneers carried out systematic terror against the Majeerteen, Hawiye, and Isaaq clans. The Red Berets systematically smashed water reservoirs to deny water to the Majeerteen and Isaaq clans and their herds. More than 2,000 members of the Majeerteen clan died of thirst, and an estimated 50,000 to 200,000 Isaaq were killed by the government (Isaaq genocide). Members of the Victory Pioneers also raped large numbers of Majeerteen and Isaaq women, and more than 500,000 Isaaq members fled to Ethiopia.

In January 1975 Barre ordered the execution of ten sheikhs who were arrested for their opposition to women inheritance laws.

=== Rebellion and ouster ===
After fallout from the unsuccessful Ogaden campaign, Barre's administration began arresting government and military officials under suspicion of participation in the 1978 coup d'état attempt. Most of the people who had allegedly helped plot the putsch were summarily executed. However, several officials managed to escape abroad and started to form the first of various dissident groups dedicated to ousting Barre's regime by force.

A new constitution was promulgated in 1979 under which elections for a People's Assembly were held. However, Barre and the politburo of his Somali Revolutionary Socialist Party continued to rule. In October 1980, the SRSP was disbanded, and the Supreme Revolutionary Council was re-established in its place. By that time, the moral authority of Barre's ruling Supreme Revolutionary Council had begun to weaken. Many Somalis were becoming disillusioned with life under military dictatorship. The regime was further weakened in the 1980s as the Cold War drew to a close and Somalia's strategic importance was diminished. The government became increasingly totalitarian, and resistance movements, supported by Ethiopia's communist Derg administration, sprang up across the country. This eventually led in 1991 to the outbreak of the civil war, the toppling of Barre's regime and the disbandment of the Somali National Army (SNA). Among the militia groups that led the rebellion were the Somali Salvation Democratic Front (SSDF), United Somali Congress (USC), Somali National Movement (SNM) and the Somali Patriotic Movement (SPM), together with the non-violent political oppositions of the Somali Democratic Movement (SDM), the Somali Democratic Alliance (SDA) and the Somali Manifesto Group (SMG). Siad Barre escaped from his palace towards the Kenyan border in a tank. Many of the opposition groups subsequently began competing for influence in the power vacuum that followed the ousting of Barre's regime. In the south in particular, armed factions led by USC commanders General Mohamed Farah Aidid and Ali Mahdi Mohamed clashed as each sought to exert authority over the capital.

== Exile and death ==
After fleeing Mogadishu on 26 January 1991 with his son-in-law General Mohammed Said Hersi Morgan, Barre temporarily remained in Burdhubo, in southwestern Somalia, his family's stronghold.

From there, he launched a military campaign to return to power. He twice attempted to retake Mogadishu, but in May 1991 was overwhelmed by General Mohamed Farrah Aidid's army and forced into exile. Barre initially moved to Nairobi, Kenya, but opposition groups there protested his arrival and the Kenyan government's support for him. In response to the pressure and hostilities, he moved two weeks later to Nigeria. Barre died of a heart attack on 2 January 1995, in Lagos. His body was returned to his hometown of Garbaharey for burial on a Bluebird Aviation flight paid for and escorted by Nigerian diplomats that took advantage of gaps in radar coverage across Africa to conceal the true purpose of the journey.

== Honours ==
- Order of the National Flag, First Class, of the Democratic People's Republic of Korea – 1972
- Order of the Yugoslav Great Star – 1976

== See also ==
- Aden Abdullahi Nur
- Mohammad Ali Samatar
- Hussein Kulmiye Afrah
- Abdullahi Yusuf Ahmed
- Muse Hassan Sheikh Sayid Abdulle
- Ali Matan Hashi
- Abdullahi Ahmed Irro
- Mohamed Osman Irro
- Dahir Adan Elmi

Political offices
| Preceded by Sheikh Mukhtar Mohamed Hussein; Acting | President of Somalia; 1969–1991 | Succeeded by Ali Mahdi Muhammad |
