= Attempts at reconciliation in Somalia (1991–2004) =

Attempt to solve a confluct in Somalia between 1991 and 2004

- Date: 1991–2004
- Location: Somalia
- Outcome: Formation of the Transitional Federal Government

Many factions opposed to Siad Barre set aside tribal and political differences to unite in purpose to overthrow his regime. After the collapse of Siad Barre's government in 1991 the nation fell into a long period of increasingly chaotic conflict between forces of clans, militias, warlords, separatist, religious functions and rebellion movements, other nations, and even the United Nations peacekeepers.

The powers that overthrew Siad Barre were composed of various clan-predominated factions, from the Hawiye-based United Somali Congress (USC), the Isaaq-based Somali National Movement (SNM), the Ogadeni-based Somali Patriotic Movement (SPM), and the Majerteen-based Somali Salvation Democratic Front (SSDF).

== Reconciliation and disarmament efforts ==
Various peacemaking and peacekeeping efforts were attempted, but all were destined for failure until most all parties had agreed to the formation of a new international community-backed Transitional Federal Government, which finally occurred 2004 in Djibouti.

=== 1991: First attempts at reconciliation ===
During the Somali civil war, a "Manifesto" was produced and supported by many of the rebel leaders. From this "Manifesto", a rebel government was formed in January 1991. Because the "Manifesto" was mostly supported by the United Somali Congress, this governmental movement became known as "USC 91". However, since not all rebel leaders were signatories, and because many other factions did not wish to submit to the USC's leadership, the "Manifesto" or "USC 91" government failed to be recognized as legitimate by all parties and was not recognized by the international community.

The first attempt at Somali national reconciliation was conference was held in Djibouti, between 5 and 11 June 1991 (Djibouti I). Four factions participated. A second conference (Djibouti II) was held in Djibouti in July 1991, but neither produced significant results.

=== 1992–1995 UN missions to Somalia ===
In late 1992, UN Secretary General Boutros Boutros-Ghali proposed an expansion of the UN humanitarian mission to Somalia to include nation building activities, including the disarming of the warring militias of the country. However, in a Time magazine article from December 28, 2002, US Special Envoy Robert B. Oakley, said three things were important to a Somali man: "his camel, his wife and his weapon. The right to bear arms is in their soul."

As Oakley astutely observed, the UN missions to Somalia would not result in the disarmament of the many factions of the Somali Civil War. Too many warlords, as well as too many common Somalis, wished to keep their weapons, and to keep their feuds alive. In 1995, the last of the UN peacekeepers were pulled out of Somalia.

UN Security Council intervention in Somalia's Civil War went back to Resolution 733, an arms control provision which established a weapons embargo on the country.

The list of UN missions to Somalia, and their US operations names, are as follows:

UN mission	US operation	Start date	End date	UNSC resolution
UNOSOM I	Operation Provide Relief	April 1992	March 1993	751
UNITAF	Operation Restore Hope	December 1992	May 4, 1993	794
UNOSOM II	Operation Continue Hope	March, 1993	March 1995	814

=== 1993 Conference on National Reconciliation ===
In early 1993, concurrent with the UNOSOM I humanitarian mission, fifteen of the warring parties of the Somali Civil War signed two agreements for national reconciliation and disarmament: an agreement to hold an Informal Preparatory Meeting on National Reconciliation, followed by the 1993 Addis Ababa Agreement made at the Conference on National Reconciliation in Somalia. Fighting continued, and the agreement later fell apart.

=== 1997 National Salvation Council ===
Organized by IGAD, and held in Sodere, Ethiopia, but boycotted by Hussein Aidid's faction as well as the newly-declared government of Somaliland. A similar conference in Sana'a, Yemen, did not include all the parties of the conflict, and was rejected by those not attending.

=== 1997 Cairo Peace Conference / Cairo Declaration ===
Hussein Aidid and representatives from 25 clans attended a peace conference in Cairo, in December 1997. While the UN Security Council lauded the efforts, which included decisions to adopt "a federal system with regional autonomy and agreement to form a transitional government of national unity", it still left the country without a national leader, many of the non-attendees balking at the results, and none of the Somali factions agreeing to disarm. Hussein Aidid and Ali Mahdi were considered opposed to the proposed settlements.

=== 1998 Baidoa Conference ===
The conference was postponed indefinitely and then cancelled after continuous fighting in the city throughout the early part of the year made it impossible to ensure security. Cholera had also broken out in Baidoa around that time. By June, Osman Hassan Ali "Ato" declared the Cairo peace process "dead".

=== 2000 Somalia National Peace Conference ===
Officially dubbed the Somalia National Peace Conference (SNPC), and sometimes called the Djibouti conference, this was a series of meetings held in Arta, Djibouti, on April 20 - May 5, 2000. The conference was aimed at bringing together representatives of the warring factions of Somalia to end the civil war that had claimed over 300,000 lives. The name Transitional National Government (TNG) was selected for the movement at this time.

Annex II of the program for the conference dealt with cease-fire, disarmament and security. It emphasized:

The desire of the Somali people for peace and security through disarmament is unambiguous. This call is heard repeated throughout the country from all segments of the Somali society, who have consistently demand [sic] an end to violence. Unless this is realized, the entire process of reconciliation, rehabilitation and reconstruction would be jeopardized, if not stillborn. One of the first responsibilities of Somalia's new transitional government will be to insist on an immediate and comprehensive cease-fire, together with binding, complete and simultaneous disarmament of al [sic] militias throughout the country consistent with the agreements they signed from 1991 to 1997, but never implemented.

It took another six years before the transitional government was in a position to implement such a cease-fire and disarmament.

=== 2001 National Commission for Reconciliation and Property Settlement ===
On May 6, 2001, an effort to create a 25-member working body, dubbed the National Commission for Reconciliation and Property Settlement (NCRPS), was damaged when Abdirizak Haji Hussein, former prime minister, was named as its head. The Somalia Reconciliation and Restoration Council (SRRC) and Puntland leadership objected strongly. Hussein later resigned on July 25, 2001.

=== 2002 Somali Reconciliation Conference ===
The 2002 Somali Reconciliation Conference held in Eldoret, Kenya, this conference was attended by most TFG supporters. However, at the time, the Rahanweyn Resistance Army (RRA) was still hotly contending with other factions, including warlord Adan Madobe-Habsade, who captured Baidoa. The RRA accused the Juba Valley Alliance of assisting the warlord, an accusation denied by the JVA leader Barre Adan Shire Hiiraale.

=== 2004 Nairobi Conference ===
In January, 2004 a productive conference was held in Nairobi, Kenya, at which the Transitional Federal Government was agreed to. A document was signed by the major factions, entitled, Declaration on the Harmonization of Various Issues Proposed by the Somali Delegates at the Somali Consultative Meetings from 9–29 January 2004. From this, the Transitional Federal Institutions were agreed to, including elections. However, none of the parties yet had disarmed.

=== 2004 presidential elections ===
On 10 October [2004], the president of Puntland, Abdullahi Yusuf Ahmed, was elected president of the Somali Transitional Federal Government (TFG) with 189 votes. The runner up, Mr. Abdullahi Ahmed Addow received 79 votes. Before voting, the 25 presidential candidates swore on the Quran and signed a declaration, pledging to support the elected president and demobilize their militia. The avowed demobilizations never occurred.
