= Dahir Adan Elmi =

Somalian military leader

Lieutenant General Dahir Adan Elmi
- ظاهر آدم علمي
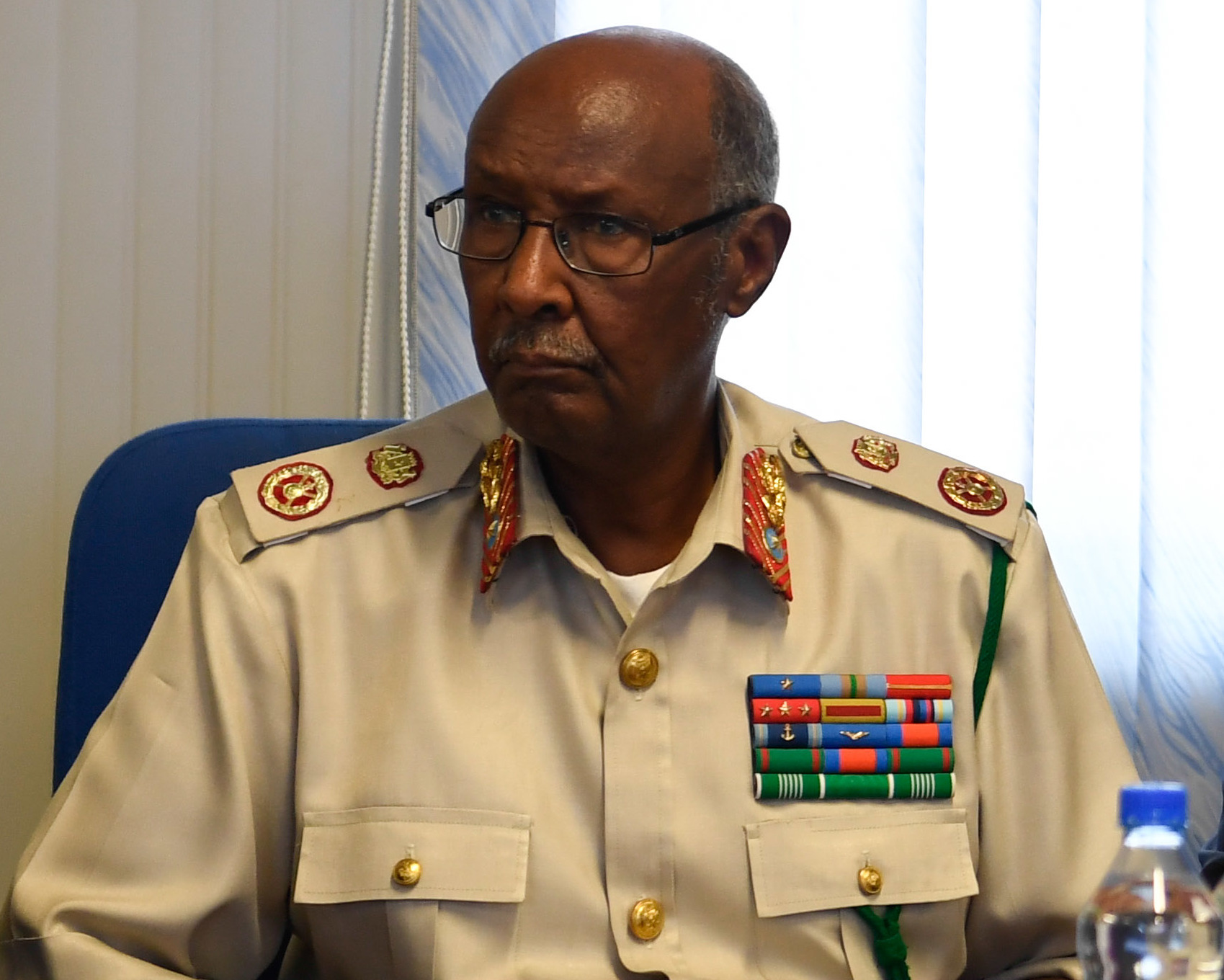

Chief of Defence Force
- In office 16 August 2018 – 27 August 2020
- Preceded by: Abdiweli Jama Hussein Gorod
- Succeeded by: Odowaa Yusuf Rageh
- In office 13 March 2013 – 25 June 2015
- Preceded by: Abdulkadir Sheikh Dini
- Succeeded by: Mohamed Adam Ahmed

Military service
- Allegiance: Federal Government of Somalia
- Branch/service: Somali National Army
- Rank: Lieutenant General
- Awards: Gold Medal for Bravery and Service; 2x Medal of Valour

Lieutenant General Dahir Adan Elmi (Somali: Daahir Aadan Cilmi, Arabic: ظاهر آدم علمي), also known as Dahir Aden Indha Qarshe, is a Somali military general. He is the former chief of the Somali Army. Lieutenant General Dahir Adan Elmi hails from the Sheekhaal clan.

== Career ==
=== Ogaden campaign ===
General Elmi led armored Somali National Army (SNA) battalions in the Qabri Dahare Front during the late 1970s Ogaden campaign. Qabri Dahare was the second city to fall during the offensive. The war was part of a broader SNA plan to unite all of the Somali-inhabited territories in the Horn region into a Greater Somalia (Soomaaliweyn).

Upon successful capture of Qabri Dahare in July 1977, the then Lieutenant General Dahir Aden Indha Qarshe continued to be part of important northern fronts leading armoured battalions in the Northern Front under the command of the 26th Division.

=== Chief of Army ===
On 13 March 2013, Elmi was appointed Chief of Army at a transfer ceremony in Mogadishu, where he replaced General Abdulkadir Sheikh Dini. Abdirisaq Khalif Elmi served as Elmi's Deputy Army Chief.

Elmi's term as Chief of Army ended on 25 June 2014, when he and his deputy General Khalif Elmi were transferred by presidential decree to other positions. The shuffle was part of a larger major national security reform. Elmi was succeeded as Chief of Army by General Abdullahi Anod, the former commander of the presidential guard unit, with General Abdullahi Osman Agey concurrently appointed as the new Deputy Chief of Army.

On August 16, 2018, Lieutenant General Dahir Adan Elmi "Indhaqarshe" was reappointed as the chief of the army.

On 17 October 2026, President Hassan Sheikh Mohamud promoted Dahir Adan Elmi to the rank of lieutenant general (Sarreeye Guud) the highest military rank in the nation. Somali news outlets reported that he became the third Somali military officer to attain the highest rank, following Mohamed Ali Samatar and Bashir Mohamed Jama.
