= Abdulkadir Sheikh Dini =

Somali politician and military official

Abdulkadir Sheikh Dini عبد القادر الشيخ ضئنئ
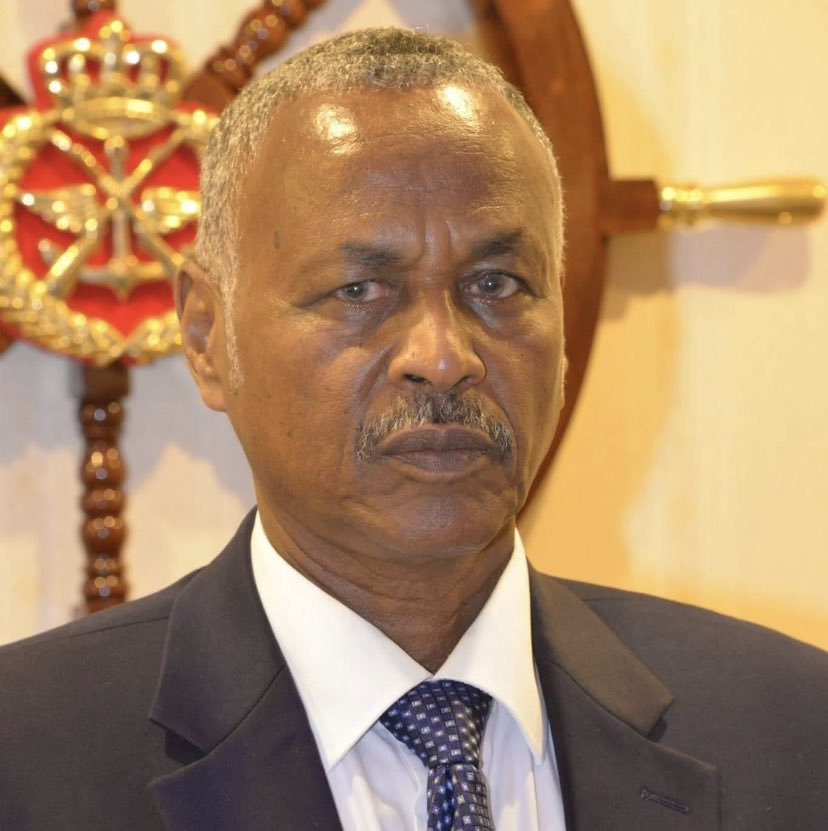

Minister of Defence
- In office 27 January 2015 – 29 March 2017
- President: Hassan Sheikh Mohamud
- Prime Minister: Omar Abdirashid Ali Sharmarke
- Preceded by: Mohamed Sheikh Hassan
- Succeeded by: Abdirashid Abdullahi Mohamed

Chief of Somali National Army
- In office 29 March 2011 – 13 March 2013
- President: Sharif Sheikh Ahmed
- Preceded by: Ahmed Mohamed Jimale
- Succeeded by: Dahir Adan Elmi

Personal details
- Born: Somalia
- Party: Independent
- Education: Odesa Military Academy; John F. Kennedy Special Warfare Center and School; Command and General Staff College; U.S. Army War College

Military service
- Branch/service: Army
- Rank: Brigadier General

General Abdulkadir Sheikh Dini (Somali: Cabdulkaadir Sheekh Diini, Arabic: عبد القادر الشيخ ضئنئ) is a Somali politician and military official. He served as Chief of Army from March 2011 to March 2013, under both the Transitional Federal Government and the succeeding Federal Government of Somalia. He is a former Minister of Defense of Somalia after being succeeded by Abdirashid Abdullahi Mohamed.

== Personal life ==
Dini was born in Somalia. He hails from the Marehan subclan of the Darod.

From 1972 to 1974, Dini studied at the Military Academy in Odesa, Ukraine. He later attended the John F. Kennedy Special Warfare Center and School in Fort Bragg, North Carolina in 1986. Between 1986 and 1987, Dini also matriculated at the U.S. Army's Command and General Staff College in Pennsylvania. He completed his military education in 1989–1990, when he graduated from the U.S. Army War College in Carlisle, Pennsylvania.

Dini speaks several languages, including Somali, Arabic, Russian and English.

== Military career ==
Dini began his military career in 1971, when he enlisted as a military cadet in the Somali Army. In 1979, he was promoted to Major Commander of Military Police Forces, Battalion level. He joined the Commando Brigade of Baledogle the following year, and in 1982 rose to the position of Commander.

In 2010, Dini was called to assist in developing a security policy for the Transitional Federal Government. He was appointed Chief of Army on 29 March 2011 by former Prime Minister Mohamed Abdullahi Farmajo. Under Dini's command, the Somali Armed Forces and allied AMISOM troops managed to flush out the Al-Shabaab insurgents from most urban centers in south and central Somalia. Dini and his deputy army chief General Abdikarin Yusuf Dhega Badan were later relieved of their duties on 13 March 2013 at a transfer ceremony in Mogadishu attended by government and AU officials, with General Dahir Adan Elmi appointed the new Chief of Army and General Abdirisaq Khalif Hussein as his deputy.

On 15 March 2013, a luncheon was held in the capital in honour of General Dini and his deputy General Dhega Badan. Attended by Somali Minister of Defence Abdihakim Mohamoud Haji-Faqi, Ugandan Ambassador to Somalia Nathan Mugisha and various AU officials, AMISOM Force Commander Lt Gen Andrew Gutti thanked Dini and Dhega Badan for their services, stating that "we in AMISOM have been proud to serve alongside such great Somali patriots[...] under Gen Dini's leadership, the Somali National Security Forces have become better organized and more effective as evidenced by the successes they have achieved against the Al Qaeda-affiliated al Shabaab terror group across the country."

== Minister of Defense ==
On 27 January 2015, Dini was appointed Minister of Defense of Somalia by new Prime Minister Omar Abdirashid Ali Sharmarke. He succeeded Mohamed Sheikh Hassan in office.

On 1 July 2015, Abdulkadir Sheikh Dini reopened the headquarters of the Somali Air Force. Located in Afisone, Mogadishu, the move would facilitate the re-establishment of the air force after 25 years of civil war. Dini said that the institution was located in a residential neighborhood for two years and was glad to locate to the original headquarters.

On 3 March 2016, a military transport carrying Dini was hit with a landmine explosion near Kismayo Airport; Dini was uninjured.
