= Mohamed Sheikh Hassan =

Somali politician

Mohamed Sheikh Hassan Hamud محمد الشيخ حسن
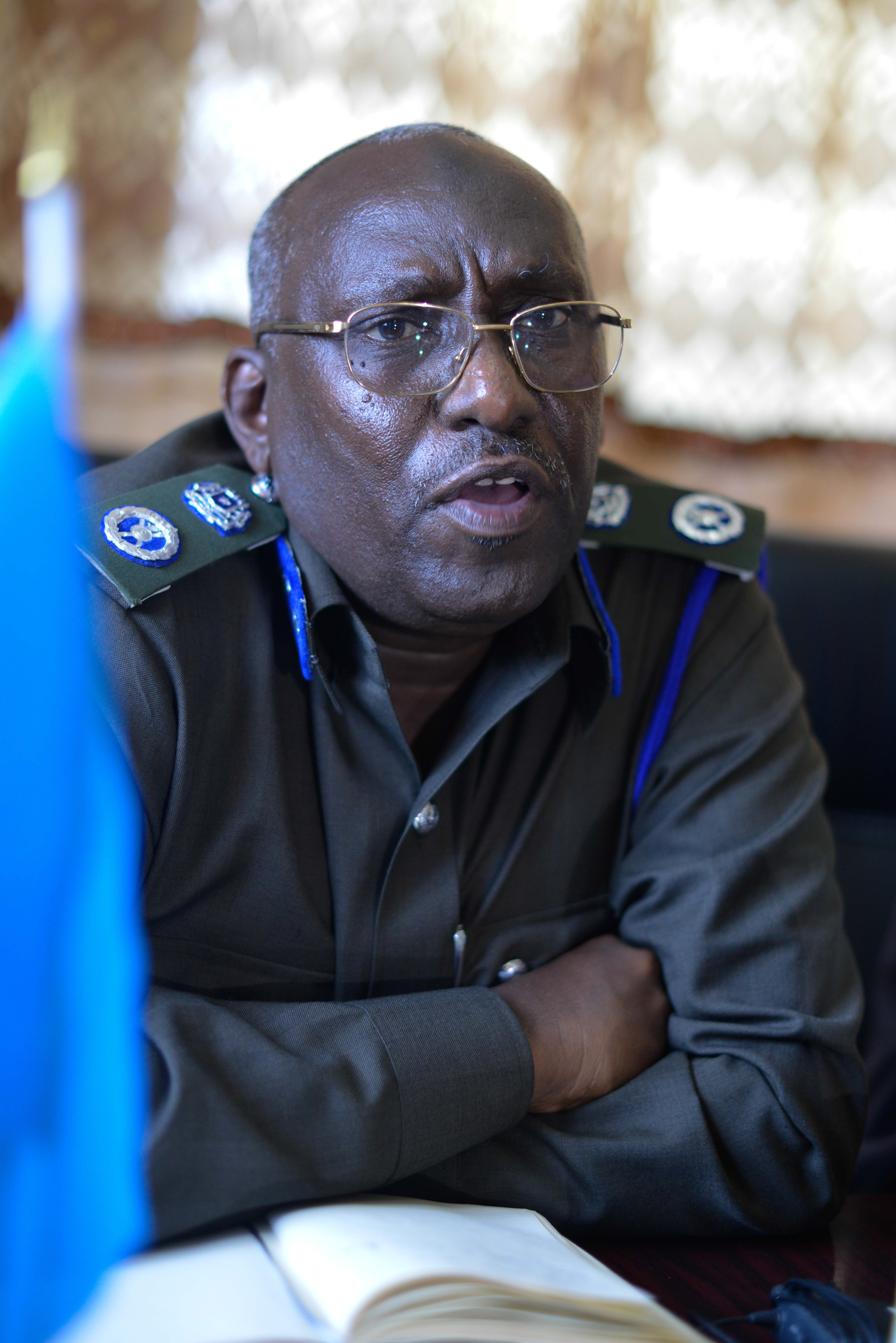

Chief of the Somali Police Force
- In office 30 April 2015 – 5 April 2017
- Prime Minister: Omar Abdirashid Ali Sharmarke
- Preceded by: Osman Omar Wehliye
- Succeeded by: Abdihakim Dahir Said

Minister of Defence of Somalia
- In office 17 January 2014 – 27 January 2015
- Prime Minister: Abdiweli Sheikh Ahmed
- Preceded by: Abdihakim Mohamoud Haji-Faqi
- Succeeded by: Abdulkadir Sheikh Dini

Personal details
- Party: Independent

Mohamed Sheikh Hassan Hamud (Somali: Maxamed Sheekh Xasan Hamud, Arabic: محمد الشيخ حسن) is a Somali politician. He is the former Chief of the Somali Police Force.

== Career ==
Hassan hails from the Rahweyn, Rewung clan.

From January 2014 to January 2015, he served as the Minister of Defence of Somalia, having been named to the position by Prime Minister Abdiweli Sheikh Ahmed. Hassan was succeeded at the office by Abdulkadir Sheikh Dini, who was appointed by new Prime Minister Omar Abdirashid Ali Sharmarke.

On 20 April 2015, Hassan was appointed the new Chief of the Somali Police Force by Prime Minister Omar Abdirashid Ali Sharmarke. He succeeded Osman Omar Wehliye at the position, who had served as interim Police Commissioner after the death of Mohamed Sheikh Ismail.
