= Mohammed Said Hersi Morgan =

Somali Politician & General (1949-2025)

Jaale Mohammed Said Hersi Morgan
- محمد سعيد حيرسي مورغان
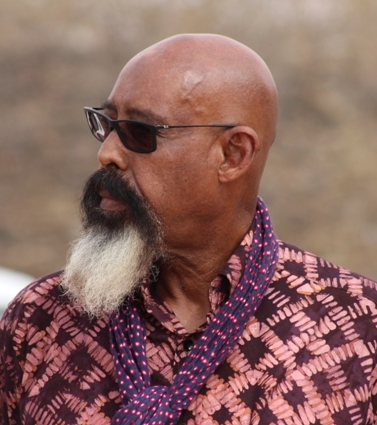

11th Minister of Defense
- In office 9 September 1990 – 26 January 1991
- President: Siad Barre
- Preceded by: Hussein Sheikh Abdirahman
- Succeeded by: Abdirahman Mahmud Ali (2005)

7th Chief of Defence Force
- In office 9 September 1990 – 26 January 1991
- President: Siad Barre
- Preceded by: Maslah Mohammed Siad Barre
- Succeeded by: Ismail Qasim Naji (2005)

Personal details
- Born: 1 January 1949 Qardho, Italian Somaliland
- Died: 28 May 2025 (aged 76) Nairobi, Kenya
- Resting place: Muscat, Oman
- Party: Somali Revolutionary Socialist Party (before 1991); Somali National Front (1991–2003)
- Other political affiliations: Somali Patriotic Movement (2002–2004); Independent (2005–2025)

Military service
- Allegiance: Somali Democratic Republic (1967–1991); Somali National Front (1991–2003); Transitional National Government (2003–2004); Transitional Federal Government (2004–2009); Puntland counter-terrorism operations (2015–2025)
- Branch: Somali National Army (1967 – 1991)
- Service years: 1967 – 2025
- Rank: Major General
- Conflicts: 1982 Ethiopian–Somali Border War Somali Civil War Somali Rebellion: Battle of Bali Dhig; 1988 Hargeisa-Burao offensive; Bombardment of Burao and Hargeisa 1988; Islamic State insurgency in Puntland

Jaale Mohammed Said Hersi Morgan, better known as General Morgan (Somali: Maxamed Siciid Xirsi Moorgan; Arabic: محمد سعيد حيرسي مورغان; 1 January 1949 – 28 May 2025), was a Somali politician and senior military official. He served as Minister of Public Works and Housing from 1989 to 1990 and was the last Minister of Defence under Siad Barre's regime. Additionally, he held various position including Chief Commander of the Somali Armed Forces.

He was the son-in-law of Siad Barre and belonged to the Harti sub-clan of the Majeerteen, part of the larger Darod tribe. During his father-in-law's rule, he held a variety of positions in the Somali National Army. Nicknamed the "Butcher of Hargeisa," Morgan was one of the architects of the Isaaq genocide from 1987 to 1989. After the collapse of the state he was a member of the Somali National Front (SNF) and later the Ethiopian backed Somalia Reconciliation and Restoration Council (SRRC).

In later life, he served as a security advisor for President of Puntland Said Abdullahi Deni, playing a significant role in the anti-ISIS campaign in Puntland. In his final years, General Morgan resided in Garoowe, Puntland, serving as a security advisor to the Puntland administration.

== Early life and education ==
Morgan was born on 1 January 1949 in Qardho district. He studied at Haji Mire primary and secondary school in Bosaso, his father later sent him to Mogadishu, where he completed his education at a school then known as “Allaah.” Subsequently, the general joined the military. In 1967, he was among the officers sent by Somalia for military training in the Soviet Union, returning to the country in 1970. Morgan's family lives in the United States.

== Career ==
=== Siad Barre Government ===
Morgan received his military training in Italy and the United States. As a colonel, he was commander of the Mogadishu sector, where the elite units of the Armed Forces were stationed (ca. 1980). (Note: This was probably Sector 77)

Morgan then went on to become commander of the Red Berets, responsible for the suppression of the revolt of the Majerteen United in the Somali Salvation Democratic Front (SSDF) in 1982. From 1986 to 1988, as a general, he was the military commander of the 26th Sector (the region of Somaliland), in which he led numerous successful battles against the Somali National Movement (SNM) and overseen the bombardment of northern cities. In September 1990 Morgan was appointed minister of defense and substitute head of state. He was also minister of public works and housing from 1990 to 1991. After the collapse of the Somali Democratic Republic, Morgan was a militia commander of the pro-Siad Barre group called the Somali National Front (1991–2003), which committed atrocities against the people between the Juba and Shabele rivers by skirmishes, killing, and destroying, the irrigation systems, and looting their stored grains (Bakaar), which ultimately led to the great 1992 Somali famine (Caga barar famine) in which nearly 300,000 people (mainly Digil and Mirifle) starved to death because of the aftermath of the rebel's genocidal tactics particularly Mohamed Farrah Aidid's refusal and looting of the humanitarian aid brought by Operations Restore Hope or the Unified Task Force (UTF). Morgan plainly stated in a public video that "his militia are surviving on looted Rahwayn's grains", in order to promote the 'endurance' of his militia and motivate his tribal leaders to support his militia.

=== Somali Civil War ===
Before the fall of the government and the subsequent civil war, Morgan was recognized as a state-sponsored war criminal. Morgan was one of the main government officials who spearheaded the state-sponsored genocide in Somaliland against the Isaaq clan. This information was thoroughly documented by Human Rights Watch. Morgan was never tried by the international courts for his crimes against humanity.

In January 1986, Morgan, who was Barre's bodyguard before he married his daughter reportedly told Isaaq nomads at a waterhole "if you Isaaqs resist, we will destroy your towns, and you will inherit only ashes". Morgan (later to be known as the Butcher of Hargeisa) was also responsible for the policy letter written to his father-in-law during his time as the military governor of the north. In this letter which came to be known as 'The Letter of Death', he "proposed the foundations for a scorched-earth policy to get rid of 'anti-Somali germs'".

The policy letter (also known as the Morgan Report) was officially a top secret report to the president on "implemented and recommended measures" for a "final solution" to Somalia's "Isaaq problem". Morgan indicated that the Isaaq people must be "subjected to a campaign of obliteration" in order to prevent them from "rais[ing] their heads again". He continued: "Today, we possess the right remedy for the virus in the [body of the] Somali State." Some of the "remedies" he discussed included: "Balancing the well-to-do to eliminate the concentration of wealth [in the hands of Isaaq]." In addition, he called for "the reconstruction of the Local Council [in Isaaq settlements] in such a way as to balance its present membership which is exclusively from a particular people [the Isaaq]; as well as the dilution of the school population with an infusion of [Ogaden] children from the Refugee Camps in the vicinity of Hargeisa".

More extreme recommendations included: "Rendering uninhabitable the territory between the army and the enemy, which can be done by destroying the water tanks and the villages lying across the territory used by them for infiltration"; and "removing from the membership of the armed forces and civil service all those who are open to suspicion of aiding the enemy – especially those holding sensitive posts".

During the late 1980s, forces under Morgan's command in Northern Somalia were severely constrained by shortages of arms and equipment. Efforts by Morgan to secure more supplies for his forces made little headway as the SNA country-wide was suffering a logistical crisis.

In May 1988, Morgan and the Ethiopian deputy minister of Defence signed a peace accord in Hargeisa, resulting in Ethiopian troops being transferred from the Ogaden to Eritrea. William Clarke writes that Morgan was appointed Somali National Army commander-in-chief on 25 November 1990.

==== Post-1991 ====
On 8 January 1993 Morgan was one of the signatories of agreement reached at the UN-sponsored Informal Preparatory Meeting on National Reconciliation, and the March 1993 Conference on National Reconciliation in Somalia, both in Addis Ababa, Ethiopia. However, fighting continued in the country unabated.

In December 1993, Morgan's troops captured Kismayo, and awaited the departure of Belgian UN peacekeepers who were stationed there. His troops had taken advantage of the UN's preoccupation with Mohamed Farah Aidid and had rearmed and regrouped. In the late 1990s, Morgan began receiving Ethiopian military backing. Flights of weaponry were dispatched from Ethiopia to his forces.

=== Transitional National Government ===
The United Nations observed that Ethiopia had provided Morgan with arms and logistical support during his 2001 attempt to capture Kismayo. The Transitional National Government (TNG) publicly accused Morgan of relying on Ethiopian support to seize Kismayo from TNG allied forces. Morgan was a member of the Ethiopian backed Somalia Reconciliation and Restoration Council (SRRC), which opposed the TNG.

Morgan made several attempts to capture Kismayo in the early 2000s. The BBC reported that had backing from the Ethiopians and was "...only major militia leader to refuse to participate in the peace process."

Morgan was present at the conclusion of the peace talks in Kenya (2002–2004) in which a transitional Somali Transitional National Government (later to become the Transitional Federal Government) was formed. This conclusion, however, was put to risk in September 2004 by the withdrawal of Morgan, who prepared his forces to attack Kismayo, controlled by the JVA which had ousted him in 1999.

According to Amnesty International "his presence at the peace talks, more than any of the other warlords, had highlighted the significance of the issue of impunity and its effect on human rights in the future."

In May 2005 Morgan left Nairobi to pay a short visit with his militia in Mogadishu and talked to representatives of the USC.

== Death and funeral ==
On 28 May 2025, Mohamed Siad Hirsi Morgan died at a hospital in Nairobi, Kenya. He was 76. According to his family, as reported to Horseed Media, he had been unwell in Kenya for several days, having experienced stomach pain while in Bosaso, the commercial hub of Puntland in the Bari Region.

The general had been residing in Garowe, the capital of Puntland, where he served as a senior advisor to the President of Puntland on matters concerning the restructuring of Puntland's armed forces.

Shortly after the death, President Said Abdullahi Deni released a statement honoring Morgan's legacy, calling him a "states man, charismatic, and humility". His body was transferred to Garowe for an official state funeral and three days of mourning beginning on 28 May 2025.

== See also ==
- Said Mohamed Hersy
- Barre Adan Shire Hiiraale
- Abdullahi Ahmed Irro
