= Ministry of Defence (Somalia) =

Government ministry of Somalia

Minister of Defence of Somalia
- Wasaaradda Gaashaandhigga
- Emblem of the Somali Ministry of Defence

Agency overview
- Formed: 12 April 1960; 66 years ago
- Jurisdiction: Federal Government of Somalia
- Headquarters: Mogadishu, Somalia
- Agency executive: Ahmed Moalim Fiqi, Minister
- Parent agency: Cabinet of Somalia
- Website: mod.gov.so

The Ministry of Defence (Somali: Wasaaradda Gaashaandhigga) is charged with co-ordinating and supervising all agencies and functions of the government relating directly to national security and the Somali Armed Forces. The President of Somalia is the Supreme Commander of the Armed Forces of the country. The Ministry of Defence provides policy framework and resources to the Armed Forces to discharge their responsibility in the context of the defence of the country. The Armed Forces (including Somali Army, Somali Air Force, and Somali Navy) under the Defence Ministry are primarily responsible for ensuring the territorial integrity of the nation. The current Minister of Defence of Somalia is Ahmed Moalim Fiqi.

== History ==
After independence, the Darawishta merged with the former British Somaliland Scouts and new recruits to form a 5,000 strong Somali National Army. The new military's first commander was Colonel Daud Abdulle Hirsi, a former officer in the British military administration's police force, the Somalia Gendarmerie. Officers were trained in the United Kingdom, Egypt, and Italy. Despite the social and economic benefits that military service brought, the Somali Armed Forces began to suffer chronic manpower shortages only a few years after independence. After the 1969 Somali coup d'état, most Ministers of Defence were drawn from the Supreme Revolutionary Council until 1990-91. Major General Muhammad Ainanshe, a member of the SRC, lost his portfolio of Minister of Defence on 10 April 1971 before his arrest on 4 May 1971.

The subsequent outbreak of the Somali Civil War from the late 1980s led to the armed forces disintegrating totally.

Somalia's armed forces were gradually reconstituted after the establishment of the Transitional Federal Government (TFG) in 2004. After the creation of the Transitional Federal Government in 2010, several ministers succeeded each other. Abdihakim Mohamed Fiqi, a former Somali diplomatic with service in Washington, became Minister of Defence in mid-November 2010. While he had known that Al-Shabaab occupied the Ministry of Defence building at the time, he had not realised the weaknesses of the interim MOD premises in the privately owned Jidda Hussein building. There, the ministry had only two rooms, without internet or electricity. Thus the handshake transfer of responsibility - there was nothing more to hand over - took place in the palace, in the living room of the Somali Armed Forces commander.

In September 2014, a Somali government delegation led by Prime Minister Abdiweli Sheikh Ahmed attended an international conference in London hosted by the British government, which centred on rebuilding the Somali National Army and strengthening the security sector in Somalia. Ahmed presented to the participants his administration's plan for the development of the Somali Armed Forces, as well as fiscal planning, human rights protection, arms embargo compliance, and ways to integrate regional militias. The summit also aimed to arrange funding for the armed forces. British Prime Minister David Cameron said that the meeting sought to outline a long-term security plan to strengthen Somalia's army, police and judiciary.

In April 2015, the federal Ministry of Defence launched its new Guulwade Plan (Victory Plan), which provided a roadmap for development of the (federal) Somali Armed Forces. It was formulated with technical support from the United Nations Assistance Mission in Somalia (UNSOM). The framework stipulates that international partners are slated to provide capacity-building as well as assistance for joint operations to 10,900 Somali national army troops, with these units drawn from various regions in the country.

As of April 2015, UNSOM coordinated international security sector assistance for the SNA in accordance with Somali federal priority areas. It also provides advice on recruitment of female officers, strictures on age appropriate military personnel, legal frameworks vis-a-vis the defence institutions, and a development strategy for the Ministry of Defence.

As of May 2015, the federal government in conjunction with UNSOM was working toward establishing a comprehensive, international standards and obligations-compliant ammunition and weapons management system. To this end, capacity-building for the physical management of arms and bookkeeping was being developed, and new storage facilities and armouries for weapons and explosives were being constructed.

On Sunday 26 December 2021, Prime Minister Mohamed Hussein Roble made a limited cabinet reshuffle, switching the portfolios of the Justice Minister and Defence Minister. Hassan Hussein Haji the previous defence minister was moved to the Ministry of Justice while Abdulkadir Mohamed Nur was moved from Justice to Defence. Immediately afterwards President Mohamed Abdullahi Mohamed "Faarmajo" suspended Roble; the two had had a stormy working relationship.

== Organization ==
- Minister of Defence
  - Deputy Minister
    - Secretary-General
      - Under the Authority of Secretary-General
        - Internal Audit and Investigation Division
        - Somali Armed Forces Council Secretariat
        - Key Performance Indicator Unit
        - Legal Division
        - Strategic Communications Unit
        - Integrity Unit
      - Deputy Secretary-General (Development)
        - Development Division
        - Procurement Division
        - Somali Armed Forces Cataloguing Authority
      - Deputy Secretary-General (Policy)
        - Policy and Strategic Planning Division
        - Defence Industry Division
        - Defence Reserve Depot
      - Deputy Secretary-General (Management)
        - Human Resource Management Division
        - Information Management Division
        - Finance Division
        - Account Division
        - Administration Division
      - Chief of Defence Forces
        - Chief of Army
        - Chief of Navy
        - Chief of Air Force
        - Joint Force Commander
        - Director of General Defence Intelligence
        - Chief of Staff Somali Armed Forces Headquarters

== Defence Ministers ==
Portrait	Name (Birth–Death)	Term of office			Political party
Portrait	Name (Birth–Death)	Took office	Left office	Time in office	Political party
• Somali Republic (1960–1969) •
Mohamed Haji Ibrahim Egal	Mohamed Haji Ibrahim Egal	1960	1961	0–1 years	
Sheikh Ali Ismail	Sheikh Ali Ismail	1961	1962	0–1 years	
Hilowle Moalin Mohamed	Hilowle Moalin Mohamed	1962	1964	1–2 years	
Aden Issaq Ahmed	Aden Issaq Ahmed	1964	1966	1–2 years	
Abdirahman Haji Mumin	Abdirahman Haji Mumin	1966	1967	0–1 years	
Haji Yusuf Iman Gulaid	Haji Yusuf Iman Gulaid	1967	1969	1–2 years	
• Somali Democratic Republic (1969–1991) •
Hilowle Moalin Mohamed	Hilowle Moalin Mohamed	1969	1970	0–1 years	
Salad Gabeire Kedie	Salad Gabeire Kedie	April 1970	July 1970	3 months	
Mohammad Ali Samatar	Lieutenant General; Mohammad Ali Samatar (1931–2016)	1970	1987	16–17 years	SRSP
Omar Haji Mohamed	Brigadier General; Omar Haji Mohamed (1934–2014)	October 1981	1982	1 year	SRSP
Aden Abdullahi Nur	General; Aden Abdullahi Nur (1940–2002)	1987	1989	1–2 years	SRSP
Hussein Sheikh Abdirahman	Hussein Sheikh Abdirahman (1941–2016); First civilian Defence Minister under Barre	1989	1990	0–1 years	SRSP
Mohammed Said Hersi Morgan	Mohammed Said Hersi Morgan (1949–2025)	1990	January 1991	0–1 years	
• Transitional Federal Government of Somalia (2004–2012) •
Abdirahman Mahmud Ali	Abdirahman Mahmud Ali	January 2005	?		
Barre Adan Shire Hiiraale	Barre Adan Shire Hiiraale	August 2006	2007		
Ismail Ahmed Nur	Ismail Ahmed Nur	December 2007	?		
Mohiyadin Muhammad Haji	Mohiyadin Muhammad Haji	January 2008	August 2008	0 years	
Hussein Sheikh Abdirahman	Hussein Sheikh Abdirahman (1945–2016)	2008	2008	0 years	
Mohamed Abdi Mohamed	Mohamed Abdi Mohamed (born 1954)	21 February 2009	August 2009	0 years	
Abdullahi Boos Ahmed	Abdullahi Boos Ahmed	August 2009	10 November 2010	0–1 years	
Abdihakim Mohamoud Haji-Faqi	Abdihakim Mohamoud Haji-Faqi	12 November 2010	20 July 2011	250 days	
Hussein Arab Isse	Hussein Arab Isse	20 July 2011	4 November 2012	1 year, 107 days	
• Federal Republic of Somalia (2012–present) •
Abdihakim Mohamoud Haji-Faqi	Abdihakim Mohamoud Haji-Faqi	4 November 2012	17 January 2014	1 year, 74 days	
Mohamed Sheikh Hassan	Mohamed Sheikh Hassan	17 January 2014	27 January 2015	1 year, 10 days	
Abdulkadir Sheikh Dini	Abdulkadir Sheikh Dini	27 January 2015	21 March 2017	2 years, 53 days	
Abdirashid Abdullahi Mohamed	Abdirashid Abdullahi Mohamed	21 March 2017	12 October 2017	205 days	
Mohamed Mursal Sheikh Abdurahman	Mohamed Mursal Sheikh Abdurahman	November 2017	March 2018	4 months	
Hassan Hussein Haji	Hassan Hussein Haji	2020	2021	0–1 years	
Abdulkadir Mohamed Nur	Abdulkadir Mohamed Nur	December 2021	March 2025	3 years, 3 months	Independent
Jibril Abdirashid Haji	Jibril Abdirashid Haji	March 2025	April 2025	1 month	Independent
Ahmed Moalim Fiqi	Ahmed Moalim Fiqi	April 2025	Incumbent	1 year, 4 months	UPD
