= Conference on National Reconciliation in Somalia =

Effort to resolve the Somali Civil War

The Conference on National Reconciliation in Somalia was an attempt to end the Somali Civil War. It led to the signing of the Addis Ababa Agreement (1993), on March 27, 1993. Fifteen different warring factions agreed to the principles of reconciliation and disarmament, but the agreement was shoaled by continued violence in Somalia. It was preceded by the Informal Preparatory Meeting on National Reconciliation.

== Representatives ==
Organization	Representative Chairmen
Somali Africans Muki Organization (SAMO)	Mohamed Ramadan Arbow
Somali Democratic Alliance (SDA)	Mohamed Farah Abdullahi
Somali National Alliance (SNA/USC)	General Mohamed Farah Aidid
Somali Democratic Movement/SNA (SDM/SNA)	Col. Mohamed Nur Aliyou
Somali Democratic Movement (SDM)	Abdi Muse Mayow
Somali National Democratic Union (SNDU)	Ali Ismael Abdi
Somali National Front (SNF)	General Omar Hagi Mohamed Hersi
Somali National Union (SNU)	Dr. Mohamed Ragis Mohamed
Somali Patriotic Movement (SPM)	General Aden Abdullahi Nur
Somali Patriotic Movement/SNA (SPM/SNA)	Ahmed Hashi Mahmoud (Vice Chairman)
Somali Salvation Democratic Front (SSDF)	General Mohamed Abshir Musse
Southern Somali National Movement/SNA (SSNM/SNA)	Col. Abdi Warsame Isaaq
United Somali Congress (USC)	Mohamed Qanyare Afrah
United Somali Front (USF)	Abdurahman Dualeh Ali
United Somali Party (USP)	Mohamed Abdi Hashi

== External resources ==
- The General Agreement signed in Addis Ababa on 8 January 1993
- Addis Ababa Agreement concluded at the first session of the Conference on National Reconciliation in Somalia, 27 March 1993
