= Aden Abdullahi Nur =

Somali military officer (1920–2002)

Major General Aden Abdullahi Nur
- "ادم عبد الله نور"جبيو 𐒛𐒆𐒗𐒒 𐒛𐒛𐒁𐒆𐒚𐒐𐒐𐒖𐒔𐒘 𐒒𐒙𐒙𐒇 "𐒌𐒖𐒁𐒕𐒙𐒓"

6th Deputy Minister of Defence and Deputy Commander-in-Chief of the Somali National Army
- In office 31 May 1984 – 20 June 1986
- President: Siad Barre
- Preceded by: Omar Haji Mohamed
- Succeeded by: Mohammed Said Hersi Morgan

5th Minister of Defence and Commander-in-Chief of the Somali National Army
- In office 20 June 1986 – 1 February 1989
- President: Siad Barre
- Preceded by: Muhammad Ali Samatar
- Succeeded by: Hussein Sheikh Abdirahman

7th Minister of Information and Tourism
- In office 1 February 1989 – 21 April 1989
- President: Siad Barre
- Preceded by: Abdirashid Sheikh Ahmed
- Succeeded by: Yassin Hajji Ismail

3rd Minister of Presidential and Public Affairs
- In office 21 April 1989 – 24 July 1989
- President: Siad Barre
- Preceded by: Abdi Warsame Isaq
- Succeeded by: Abdullahi Osoble Siad

2nd Chairman of the Somali Patriotic Movement
- In office 12 April 1992 – 5 June 2002
- Preceded by: Bashir Bililiqo
- Succeeded by: Mohammed Said Hersi Morgan

Personal details
- Born: 10 October 1920 Mado Gashi, Northern Frontier District
- Died: 5 June 2002 (aged 81) Nairobi, Kenya
- Resting place: Bu'ale, Middle Juba, Somalia
- Party: Somali Revolutionary Socialist Party (Somalia) Somali Patriotic Movement
- Relations: Bashir Bililiqo [son-in-law]
- Education: (England) Royal Military Academy Sandhurst (Soviet Union) Odesa Military Academy

Military service
- Allegiance: United Kingdom [1941–1963]. Kenya [1963–1969]. (Somalia) Somali Democratic Republic [1969–1990]. (Somalia) Somali Patriotic Movement [1991–2002].
- Branch/service: (United Kingdom) King's African Rifles Kenya Defence Forces; Somali National Army (Somalia) Somali Patriotic Movement
- Years of service: 1941–2002
- Rank: Major General
- Commands: (United Kingdom) Commander of the Lenet Military Training Academy [1953–1954]. (United Kingdom) Commander of the King's African Rifles [1958–1963]. Commander of the Ground Forces of the Kenya Defence Force [1963–1967]. Commander of the Training Department of the Ministry of Defence of Kenya [1967–1968]. Commander of the Halane Military Training School [1970–1973]. Commander of the Training Department of the Somali National Army [1973–1975]. Commander of the Strategy Department of the Somali National Army [1975–1979]. Director of the Ministry of Defence of Somalia [1979–1982]. Chairman of the Defence Committee of the Somali National Assembly [1982–1984].
- Battles/wars: World War II; East African campaign; Korean War; Malayan Emergency; Mau Mau rebellion; Shifta War; 1978 coup attempt; Ethiopian–Somali conflict; Ogaden War; 1982 Border War; Somali Rebellion; Somali Civil War

Aden Abdullahi Nur "Gabyow" (10 October 1920 – 5 June 2002) (Somali: Aadan Cabdullaahi Nuur "Gabyoow", Osmanya: 𐒛𐒆𐒗𐒒 𐒛𐒛𐒁𐒆𐒚𐒐𐒐𐒖𐒔𐒘 N𐒙𐒙𐒇 "G𐒖𐒁𐒕𐒙𐒓", Arabic: "ادم عبد الله نور"جبيو), was a Somali military officer, politician and faction leader who held senior roles in the Somali National Army.

== Early years ==
Gabyow was born on 10 October 1920 in Mado Gashi, in the Northern Frontier District, then under British rule. He completed his primary education in Garissa, the district capital.

In 1941, he joined the British Colonial Army in charge of the Horn of Africa, the King's African Rifles, in the third battalion. He trained in Jinja (present-day Uganda) under British rule. In 1943, he was assigned to Jijiga, the main base of the King's African Rifles in the Ethiopian Somali Region, and was promoted to sergeant. Gabyow later served in British Malaya in the 1940s and 1950s.

== Career ==
In 1963, Gabyow became a platoon leader in the newly formed Kenya Army. In 1970, he travelled to Dar es Salaam, Tanzania, and was sent to Mogadishu by the Somali embassy. He was sent to the Soviet Union for four years of training in 1970. Upon his return, he was promoted to head of a new police station and was later appointed head of Halane military training station in 1976. In that same year, he was promoted to the rank of colonel.

After heading the Halane military training station, Somali President Siad Barre nominated Gabyow as Minister of Defense. In the years to come, following a conflict with Barre, he was arrested and imprisoned in 1988.

=== Somali Patriotic Movement (SPM) ===
The Somali Patriotic Movement was formed in 1985, as a result of a split within the Somali Salvation Democratic Front by military dissidents from Gabyow's Ogaden clan. In 1988, they demanded the release of Gabyow and encouraged officers from the Ogaden clan to resign, leading to the defection of Colonel Ahmed Omar Jess. Gabyow's sacking and imprisonment led to a conflict that had been building for years. In March 1989, soldiers of the Ogaden mutinied in Kismayo, and fighting continued until government troops gained the upper hand in July.

=== Civil War ===
In January 1991, the government of Siad Barre was toppled in Mogadishu by the Hawiye-dominated United Somali Congress. In February 1991, fighting erupted between the USC and the SPM in Afgoye. The SPM were forced to flee south to Kismayo, where they joined other Darod who had fled from Mogadishu. In April of the same year, the SPM lost control of Kismayo, and the USC captured the city at the end of the month, pushing the SPM/SNF south of Dhobley.

Gabyow was released in 1991 when the USC overran the capital. Following the defeat of SPM, various Darod factions, including the SPM, SSDF, and SNF, regrouped under the banner of SPM. Gabyow was appointed the chairman of SPM, taking over from Colonel Biliqo, and Jess became the military commander. General Morgan was given charge of the police. The SPM recaptured Kismayo and Barawa in June 1991.

Following their defeat, the Darod factions, including the SPM (Ogaden), SSDF (Harti) and SNF (Marehan), regrouped under the banner of the SPM. During Internal Darod conflicts over land, Aidid made statements that were interpreted by Darod factions as threatening their presence in Somalia. Gabyow was appointed the new chairman of the SPM, and Jess the military commander. General Morgan (Majeerteen and Barre's son-in-law) was given charge of the police. The election of Gabyow as chairman led to a rift between Gabyow and Jess, reportedly because Gabyow was elected chairman to ensure the support of his Awlihan clan, which had previously supported Jess.

In June 1991, the SPM recaptured Kismayo and Brava. Afterwards, USC defeated the second attempt to retake Mogadishu.

In December 1991, during the re-election of the SPM chairman, Gabyow combined forces with Morgan, who led SSDF/SPM, to remove Jess's forces from Kismayo and Brava. Jess then allied with General Mohamed Farrah Aideed's USC, which became known as the Somali Liberation Army (SLA). Their combined forces pushed Gabyow and Morgan out of Kismayo, forcing Siad Barre into exile in April 1992. Following this victory, Aideed and Jess formed the Somali National Alliance (SNA), combining with the SDM and the SSNM. As a result of a US-led UN-sanctioned intervention in Somalia, the Unified Task Force (UNITAF) took control of Kismayo. When the forces withdrew, the city once again remained under the control of an alliance of SPM/SSDF/SNF forces.

=== Cairo Peace Conference ===
General Gabyow was among 25 delegates who attended the Cairo Peace Conference in 1998. Colonel Abdullahi Yusuf Ahmed and Gabyow left the Cairo talks and later announced their rejection of the Cairo Declaration. Gabyow accused Hussein Aideed, son of Aideed, and the Egyptian government of instigating violence in Kismayo, but both the Egyptian authorities and Aideed denied any involvement.

Morgan and Gabyow, both members of the Darod clan, reportedly viewed the Cairo Declaration as favouring Hawiye leaders, including Hussein Farrah Aideed and Ali Mahdi Muhammad. The Cairo Declaration ultimately failed to produce a lasting peace agreement, with disagreements over disarmament among signatories cited as a contributing factor.

In 2000, Gabyow was among several leaders calling for a federal system in Somalia.

== Death ==
Gabyow died on June 5, 2002, in Nairobi, Kenya, after suffering a stroke at the age of 81. His body was subsequently flown to Bu'ale, Middle Juba, where his funeral was held.

== See also ==
- Siad Barre
- Mohammad Ali Samatar
- Abdullah Mohamed Fadil
- Mohammed Said Hersi Morgan
- Mohamed Farrah Aidid
- Abdullahi Yusuf Ahmed
- Hasan Muhammad Nur Shatigadud
