= 1984 Somali parliamentary election =

Parliamentary elections were held in Somalia on 31 December 1984. The country was a one-party state at the time, with the Somali Revolutionary Socialist Party (SRSP) as the sole legal party. Voters were asked to approve a list of 171 SRSP candidates. Turnout was reported to be 99.86% by the communist government.

== Results ==
Party	Votes	%	Seats	+/–
Somali Revolutionary Socialist Party	4,207,977	99.89	171	0
Against	4,700	0.11	–	–
Appointed members			6	0
Total	4,212,677	100.00	177	0
Valid votes	4,212,677	99.95		
Invalid/blank votes	1,990	0.05		
Total votes	4,214,667	100.00		
Registered voters/turnout	4,220,466	99.86		
Source: Inter-Parliamentary Union
