= Abdullahi Anod =

Somali military leader

Abdullahi Anod عبد الله عنود
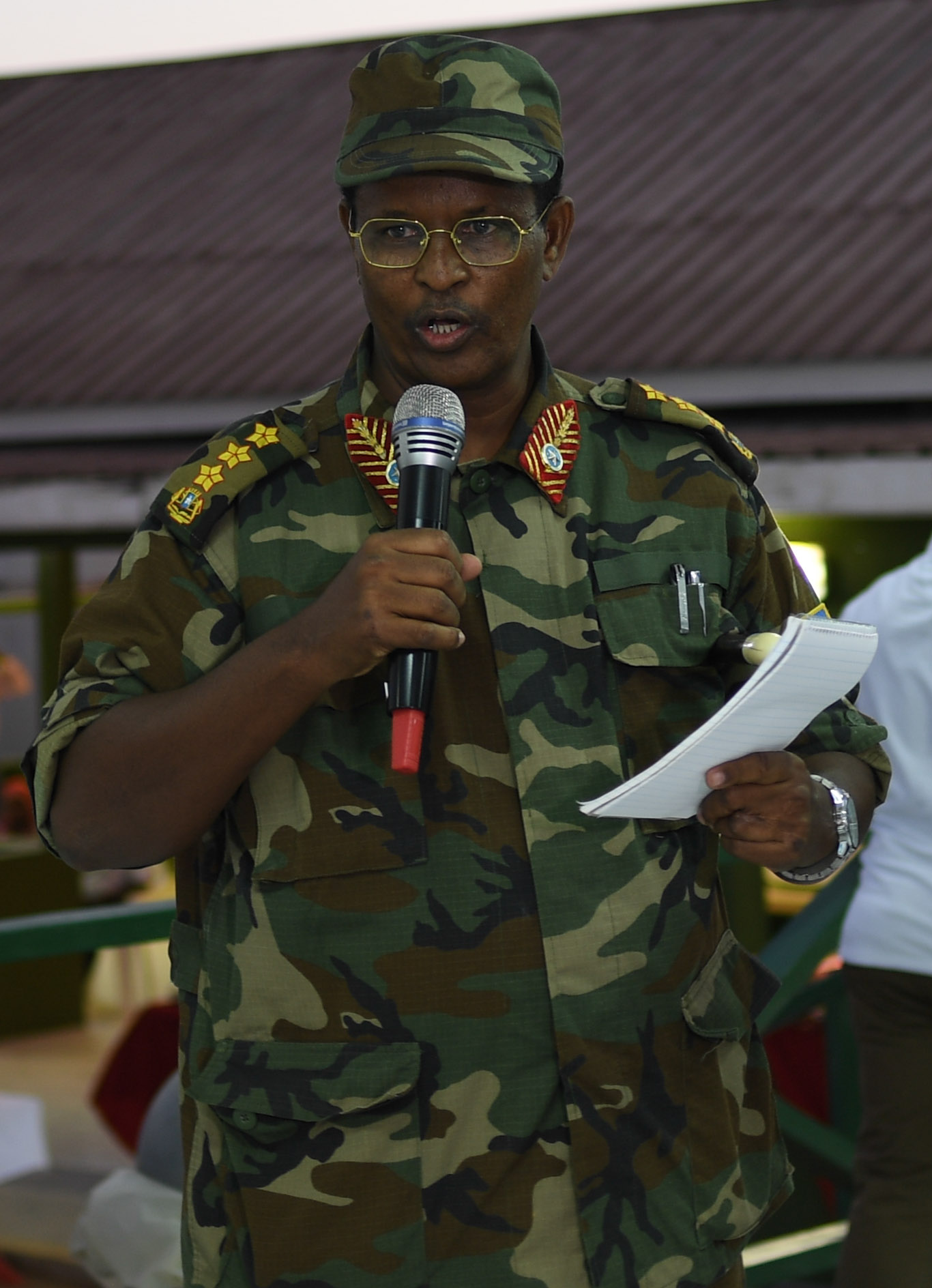
- Anod in 2018

1st Chief of Defence Force (Somalia)

Military service
- Allegiance: Federal Government of Somalia
- Branch/service: Somali National Army
- Rank: Major General
- Awards: Gold Medal for Bravery and Service

General Abdullahi Anod (Somali: Cabdulaahi Caanood, Arabic: عبد الله عنود) is a Somali military leader. He is a former commander of Somalia's presidential guard unit. On 25 June 2014, Anod was appointed the new Chief of the Somali National Army.

He replaced General Dahir Adan Elmi at the position. General Abdullahi Osman Agey was concurrently named as Anod's new Deputy Chief of Army.
