= Hussein Sheikh Abdirahman =

Somali judge and politician

Minister of Defence
- In office 1989–1990
- President: Siad Barre
- Preceded by: Aden Abdullahi Nur
- Succeeded by: ?

Personal details
- Born: 1941 Aware, Somali Region, Ethiopia
- Died: May 16, 2016 (aged 74-75) (death announced) Minneapolis
- Party: Somali Revolutionary Socialist Party
- Profession: Judge; Politician; Community advocate

Hussein Sheikh Abdirahman (Somali: Xuseen Sh. Cabdiraxmaan; Arabic: حسين شيخ عبد الرحمن) (1941 – c. May 16, 2016) was a Somali judge and politician. Abdirahman served as the Minister of Defence from 1989 to 1990 under President Siad Barre. He was the first civilian to be appointed Minister of Defence during the Barre regime, as all of Abdirahman's predecessors had been members of the military.

Abdirahman was born in 1941 in Aware, a town in the Aware district of Somali Region, Ethiopia.

Abdirahman spent much of his career working in Somalia's justice system before entering politics. At various times during his career, Abdirahman served as the chief of the magistrates court of Mogadishu, Attorney General, the commissioner of Sanaag region, and the chief of the appeals court of Mudug region.

Abdirahman's judicial career was noticed by President Siad Barre, the leader of the country's military junta. In January 1989 he was serving as Attorney General. On 30 January 1989, Barre appointed Abdirahman as Defence Minister, becoming the first civilian to head the defence ministry under Barre's rule. The appointment of Abdirahman sparked criticism against Barre, because Abdirahman had no military experience at the time. Abdirahman headed the Ministry of Defence from 1989 until 1990.

In 1991, Abdirahman immigrated from Somalia to the United States following the collapse of Barre's rule. He settled in Minnesota, where he became a community leader for the Somali American community in Minneapolis, as well as around the U.S.

Abdirahman died at a hospital in the Minneapolis, after being hospitalized for several months. His family announced his death on Monday, May 16, 2016.
