= Abdirashid Abdullahi Mohamed =

Somali politician

Rashid Abdullahi Mahamed MP
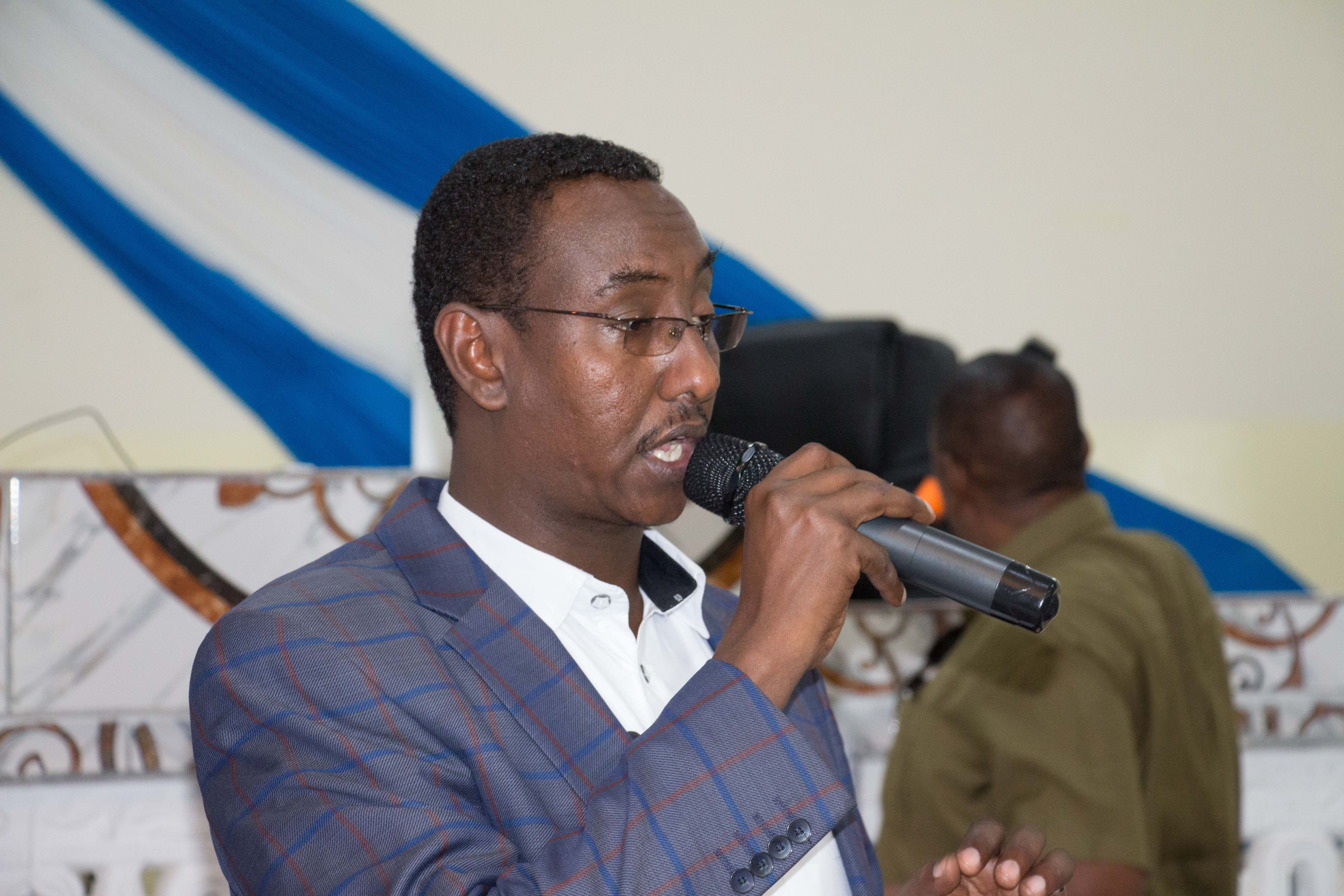
- Abdirashid Abdullahi Mohamed (August 2016)

Minister of Defence
- In office 29 March 2017 – 12 October 2017
- President: Mohamed Abdullahi Mohamed
- Prime Minister: Hassan Ali Khaire
- Preceded by: Abdulkadir Sheikh Dini

Rashid Abdullahi Mohamed (Somali: Rashiid Cabdullahi Moxamed) is a Somali politician. He is the former governor of the Bay region of Somalia. He also a former Somali Minister of Defence. On 29 March 2017, his inclusion nomination of cabinet's Prime Minister Hassan Ali Khaire appointment was approved by Federal Parliament of Somalia.
