= Abdirahman Haji Mumin =

Somali politician (1930–1990)

Minister of Defence
- In office 1966–1967
- Preceded by: Aden Isaq Ahmed
- Succeeded by: Haji Yusuf Iman Gulaid

Personal details
- Born: 10 May 1930 Bilaal, Italian Somalia (now Somalia)
- Died: 1990
- Party: Somali Youth League (SYL)

Abdirahman Haji Mumin (1930–1990) was Defence Minister of Somalia during Trust Territory of Somaliland under administration of Abdullahi Isa, he also served as Somali Minister of Defense under Aden Adde from 1966 to 1967. He served in the administration of Abdullahi Isa.
