= Abdihakim Dahir Said =

Abdihakim Dahir Said عبد الحكيم ضاهر سعيد
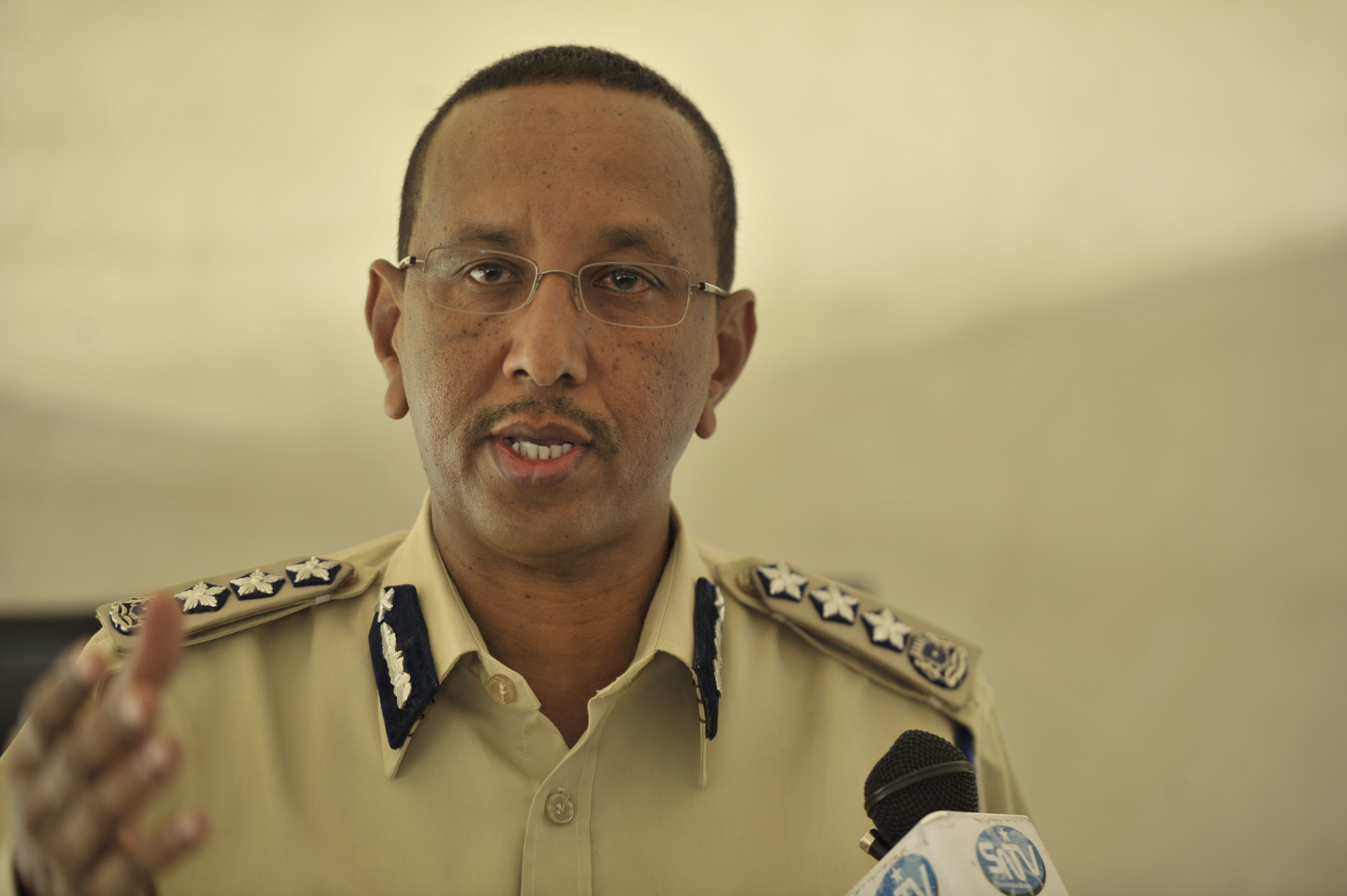

Former Chief of the Somali Police Force
- Incumbent
- Assumed office 6 April 2017 to 10 December 2017
- Prime Minister: Mohamed Hussein Roble
- Preceded by: Mohamed Sheikh Hassan
- In office 13 May 2013 – 9 July 2014
- Prime Minister: Abdiweli Sheikh Ahmed
- Preceded by: Shareif Sheikhuna Maye
- Succeeded by: Mohamed Sheikh Ismail

Personal details
- Party: Independent

Military service
- Allegiance: Somalia
- Branch/service: Police
- Rank: Brigadier General

Abdihakim Dahir Said (Somali: Cabdihakiin Dahir Saciid, Arabic: عبد الحكيم ضاهر سعيد) is a Somali police officer. He was the Chief of the Somali Police Force, having been appointed to the position on 13 May 2013 by Prime Minister Abdiweli Sheikh Ahmed. Said succeeded Shareif Sheikhuna Maye in office. Said's term ended on 9 July 2014, when he was replaced with Mohamed Sheikh Ismail. In April 2017, he was again appointed as the Chief of Somali Police.
