= 1979 Somali parliamentary election =

Parliamentary elections were held in Somalia on 30 December 1979. The elections were the first since 1969 and the first to be held under the new constitution approved in a referendum held in August, which had made the country a one-party state. As a result, the Somali Revolutionary Socialist Party (SRSP) was the only party to participate in the election, with voters being asked to vote yes or no to a single list of 171 candidates. A reported 99.95% of voters ultimately approved the list. The Assembly elected Siad Barre as President, who then nominated a further six members to the Assembly.

== Results ==
Party	Votes	%	Seats
Somali Revolutionary Socialist Party	3,982,532	99.95	171
Against	1,826	0.05	–
Appointed members			6
Total	3,984,358	100.00	177
Valid votes	3,984,358	99.96	
Invalid/blank votes	1,480	0.04	
Total votes	3,985,838	100.00	
Source: Inter-Parliamentary Union, Osman Haji,
