= Mareeg =

- Town
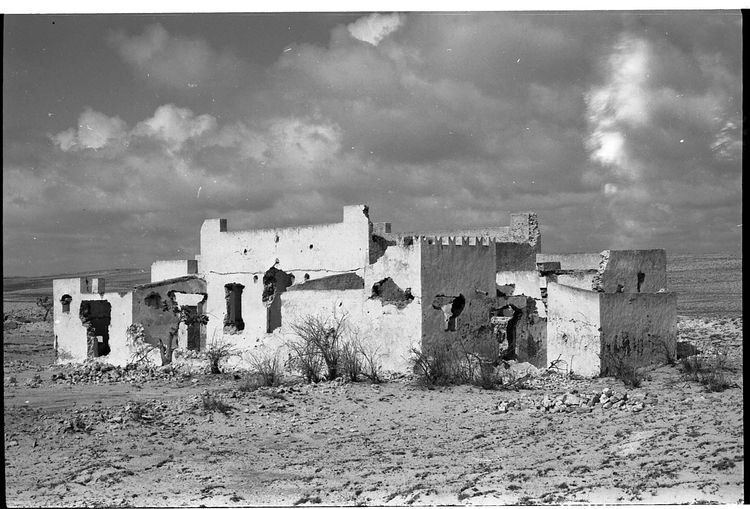
- Remains of an abandoned caravanserai at Mareeg, photographed by Neville Chittick in 1975.

- Location in Somalia
- Coordinates: 3°46′N 47°18′E
- Country: Somalia
- State: Galmudug
- Region: Galguduud
- District: El Dher District
- Time zone: UTC+3 (EAT)

Mareeg (also known as Mareg, Meregh and Märēg) is a locality in the Galguduud region of central Somalia, in the Galmudug state.

== History ==
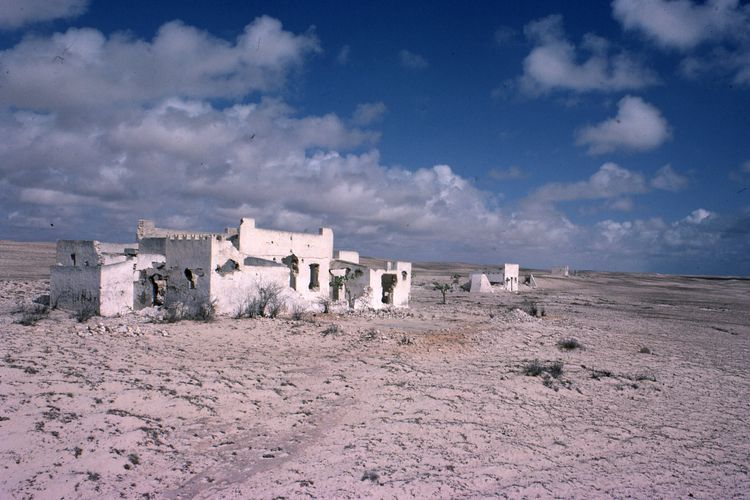
Ruins of Mareeg, capital of the Ajuran Empire, photographed by Neville Chittick in 1975.

The town was founded in the 13th century as the capital of the Ajuran Empire. It later came under the Hiraab Imamate after the fall of the Ajuran Empire in the late 17th century. In 1891, the religious figure Sheikh Daud Culusow, a Waceysle Abgaal Imam, established the modern town of Mareeg and a principality that also encompassed Ceel Buur, Masagaway, Xarardheere, alongside his two disciples; Xaaji Cumar Muudey and Macallin Cusman Kulmiye, also of the Waceysle subclan. Sheikh Cumar Muudey served as the judge of the town, and Macalin Cusman led the Quranic school. Sheikh Daauud founded a mosque, opened an Islamic court, and invited his people to a new era of Islamic rule. Sheikh Daud Culusow established the Sharia and found a standing army. The principality was under threat from the European Colonial project of Yusuf Ali Kenadid's dynasty in Hobyo and the Dervish movement forces coming from Beledweyne (named Bulo Macanne at the time). Both threats or dangers of whom were defeated decisively by Sheikh Daud Culusow and his forces.

According to the catalogo of the Museo della Garesa, coins from an early historical epoch were also recovered in the town.

== Notable residents ==
- Osman Haji Mohamed, Member of Parliament with the Somali Youth League.
- Daud Abdulle Hirsi , first chief of the army Somali armed forces
