= Osman Haji =

Somali Youth League MP

Osman Haji Mohamed Afrah Garuun
- عثمان حاجي محمد
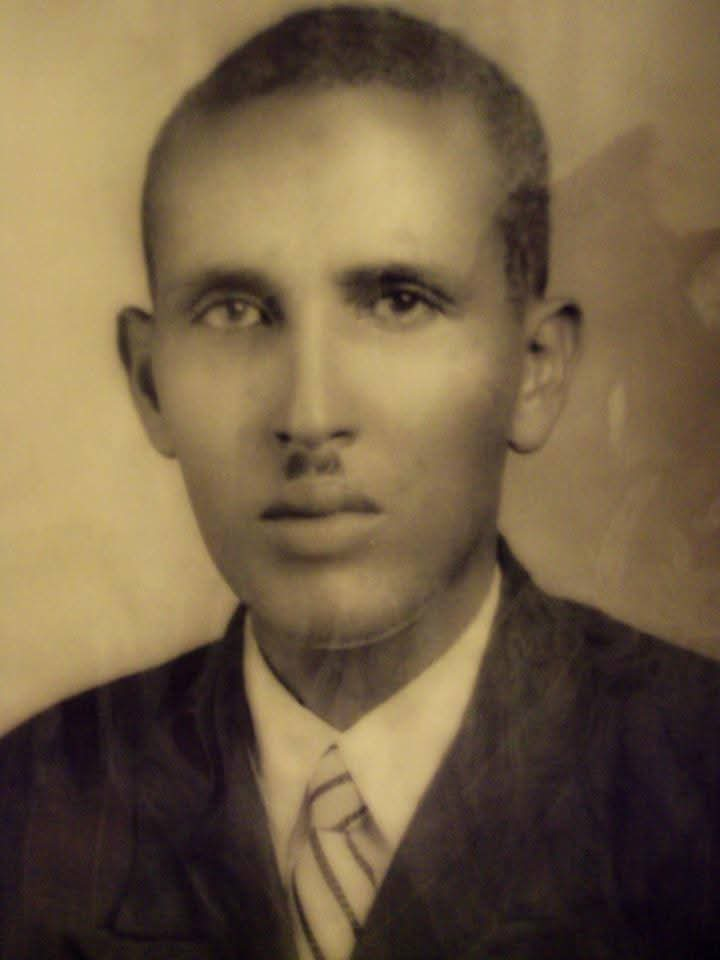
- Born: 1920; Mareeg, Somalia
- Died: July 28, 1982 (aged 61–62); Mogadishu, Somalia
- Other name: Osman Baketti
- Occupation: Member of Parliament

Osman Haji Mohamed (Somali: Cismaan Xaaji Maxamed, Arabic: عثمان حاجي محمد) (b. 1920 – d. July 28, 1982), also known as Osman Baketti, was a Somali politician. He was a prominent figure in the government of the Trust Territory of Somalia and the succeeding civilian administration of independent Somalia.

== Early years ==
Osman was born in 1920 in the town of Mareeg, situated in the El Dher District in central Somalia. The son of prominent local figure and hero Mohamed Afrah Garuun, he attended madrassahs in El Dher, before enrolling in a school in Mogadishu.

Growing up, he enjoyed reading poetry, running and horseback riding.

== Career ==
Osman joined the Somali Youth League (SYL) in 1944, prior to entering parliament. He was noted for his disciplined work and independence-oriented positions. As the first official political party in the territory, the SYL championed the cause of independence and social justice. Its early leaders were typically young, self-educated, intelligent, confident and determined.

In 1945, the Potsdam Conference was held, where it was decided not to return administration of Italian Somaliland to Italy. The United Nations opted instead in November 1949 to grant Italy trusteeship of Italian Somaliland through the new Trust Territory of Somaliland. However, it did so only under close supervision and on the condition — first proposed by the SYL and other nascent Somali political organizations that were then agitating for independence, such as the Marehan Union Party, Hizbia Digil Mirifle Somali (HDMS) (which later became Hizbia Dastur Mustaqbal Somali) and the SNL — that Somalia achieve independence within ten years. Osman subsequently became a member of the new-established Advisory Committee of Somalia.

During the trusteeship period in the 1950s, SYL representatives gained experience in legislative debates on political, economic and social issues that the soon-to-be independent territory would likely face. In the 1956 parliamentary elections, Osman was among the first seventy MPs (Deputato) elected. He represented the El Bur constituency, as El Dher was not yet a district. However, Osman endeavored to make El Dher a full district with two seats. After a few years of campaigning, he achieved this goal, establishing the new district of El Dher.

Noted for his patriotism, Osman was overwhelmingly re-elected by the El Dher electorate for a third term. He would serve in this capacity from 1960 to 1967.

On October 15, 1969, while paying a visit to the northern town of Las Anod, Somalia's then President Abdirashid Ali Shermarke was shot dead by one of his own bodyguards. His assassination was quickly followed by a military coup d'état on October 21, 1969 (the day after his funeral), in which the Somali Army seized power without encountering armed opposition — essentially a bloodless takeover. The putsch was spearheaded by Major General Mohamed Siad Barre, who at the time commanded the army.

Alongside Barre, the Supreme Revolutionary Council (SRC) that assumed power after President Sharmarke's assassination was led by Lieutenant Colonel Salaad Gabeyre Kediye and Chief of Police Jama Korshel. Kediye officially held the title of "Father of the Revolution," and Barre shortly afterwards became the head of the SRC. The SRC subsequently renamed the country the Somali Democratic Republic, arrested members of the former civilian government, banned political parties, dissolved the parliament and the Supreme Court, and suspended the constitution. Osman was among the politicians detained by the SRC, for allegedly having participated in an abortive counter-coup in 1970 with Kediye.

After a long career in Somali politics, Osman died on July 28, 1982, in Mogadishu.

== See also ==
- Haji Bashir Ismail Yusuf
- Haji Yusuf Iman Guled
- Salaad Gabeyre Kediye
