= 1986 Somali presidential election =

- 23 December 1986
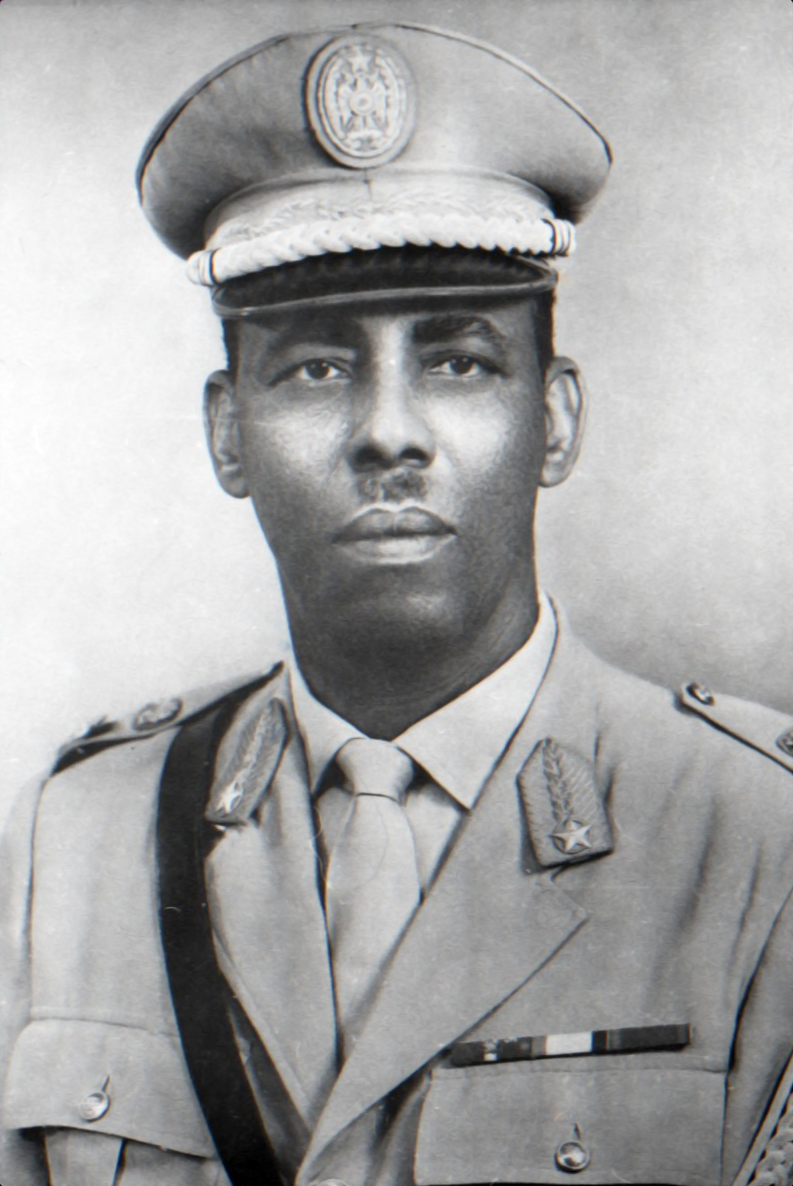
Nominee	Siad Barre
Party	SRSP
Popular vote	4,889,078
Percentage	99.97%
President before election
Siad Barre
SRSP
Elected President
Siad Barre
SRSP

Presidential elections were held in Somalia on 23 December 1986, the first time a direct election for President had been held. The country was a one-party state at the time, with the Somali Revolutionary Socialist Party (SRSP) as the sole legal political party. Its leader, incumbent President Siad Barre, was the only candidate. He was re-elected with fewer than 1,500 votes against his candidacy.

== Results ==
Candidate	Party	Votes	%
Siad Barre	Somali Revolutionary Socialist Party	4,887,592	99.97
Against		1,486	0.03
Total		4,889,078	100.00
Source: Nohlen et al.
