= Hussein Arab Isse =

Somali politician

Hussein Arab Isse حسين عرب عيسى
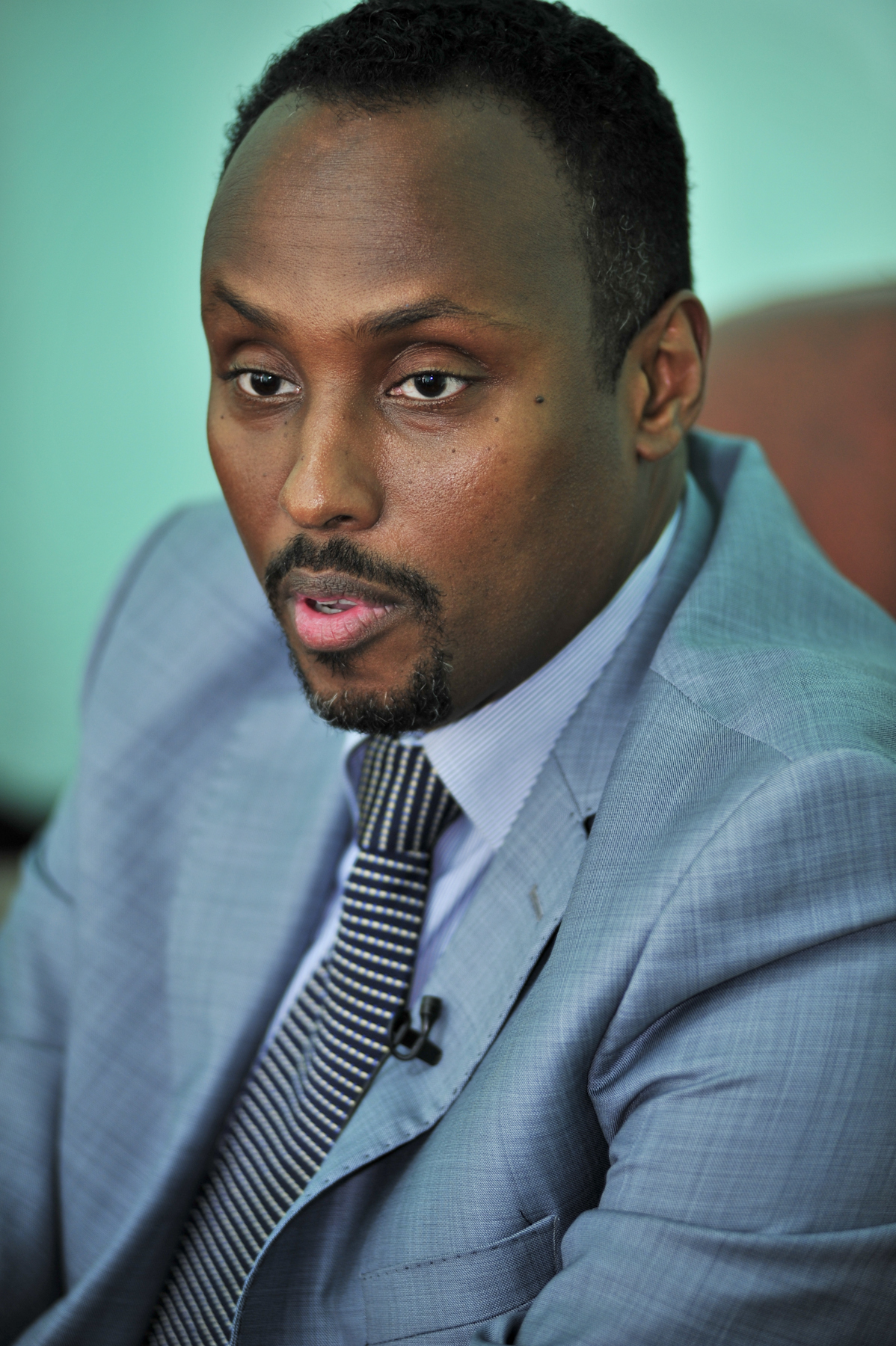

Minister of Defence of Somalia
- In office 20 July 2011 – 4 November 2012
- Preceded by: Abdihakim Mohamoud Haji-Faqi
- Succeeded by: Abdihakim Mohamoud Haji-Faqi

Deputy Prime Minister of Somalia
- In office 20 July 2011 – 4 November 2012
- Preceded by: Abdihakim Mohamoud Haji-Faqi
- Succeeded by: Fowsiyo Yusuf Haji Adan

Personal details
- Born: Mogadishu, Somalia
- Party: Transitional Federal Government (TFG)

Hussein Arab Isse (Somali: Xuseen Carab Ciise, Arabic: حسين عرب عيسى), also spelled Hussein Arab Issa, is a Somali politician. He was the Minister of Defence and the Deputy Prime Minister of Somalia from 20 July 2011 to 4 November 2012.

== Biography ==
Isse hails from the Reer Iidle sub-division of the Ciidagale Garhajis subclan of the wider Isaaq. He holds dual Somali and American citizenship.

== Career ==
On 20 July 2011, Isse was appointed Somalia's Minister of Defence and a Deputy Prime Minister by the new Premier Abdiweli Mohamed Ali. He succeeded Abdihakim Mohamoud Haji-Faqi in office.

On 18 October 2011, Isse and other Transitional Federal Government (TFG) officials hosted a Kenyan delegation in Mogadishu to discuss security issues cooperation against Al-Shabaab as part of the ongoing coordinated Operation Linda Nchi. Isse and Kenya's Minister of Defence Mohamed Yusuf Haji then signed an agreement to collaborate against the insurgent group. In early June 2012, Kenyan forces were formally integrated into AMISOM.

On 4 November 2012, Isse's term as Defence Minister of Somalia ended, as new Prime Minister Abdi Farah Shirdon reassigned Haji-Faqi to the portfolio.
