= Haji Yusuf Iman Guled =

Haji Yusuf Iman Guled حاجي يوسف إيمان جوليد

Minister of Defence of Somalia
- In office 1967–1969
- Prime Minister: Mohamed Haji Ibrahim Egal
- Preceded by: Abdirahman Haji Mumin
- Succeeded by: Hilowle Moalin Mohamed

Haji Yusuf Iman Guled (Somali: Xaaji Yuusuf Imaan Guleed, Arabic: حاجي يوسف إيمان جوليد) was a Somali politician.

== Biography ==
Guled was raised in Somalia. He served as the newly independent country's Minister of Defence from 1967 to 1969, and was a key figure in the nation's early civilian administration.

== See also ==
- Haji Bashir Ismail Yusuf
- Osman Haji
