= Bombardment of Burao and Hargeisa 1988 =

1988 events in the Somali Civil War

Bombing of Hargeisa and Burao (1988)
- Part of the Somaliland War of Independence
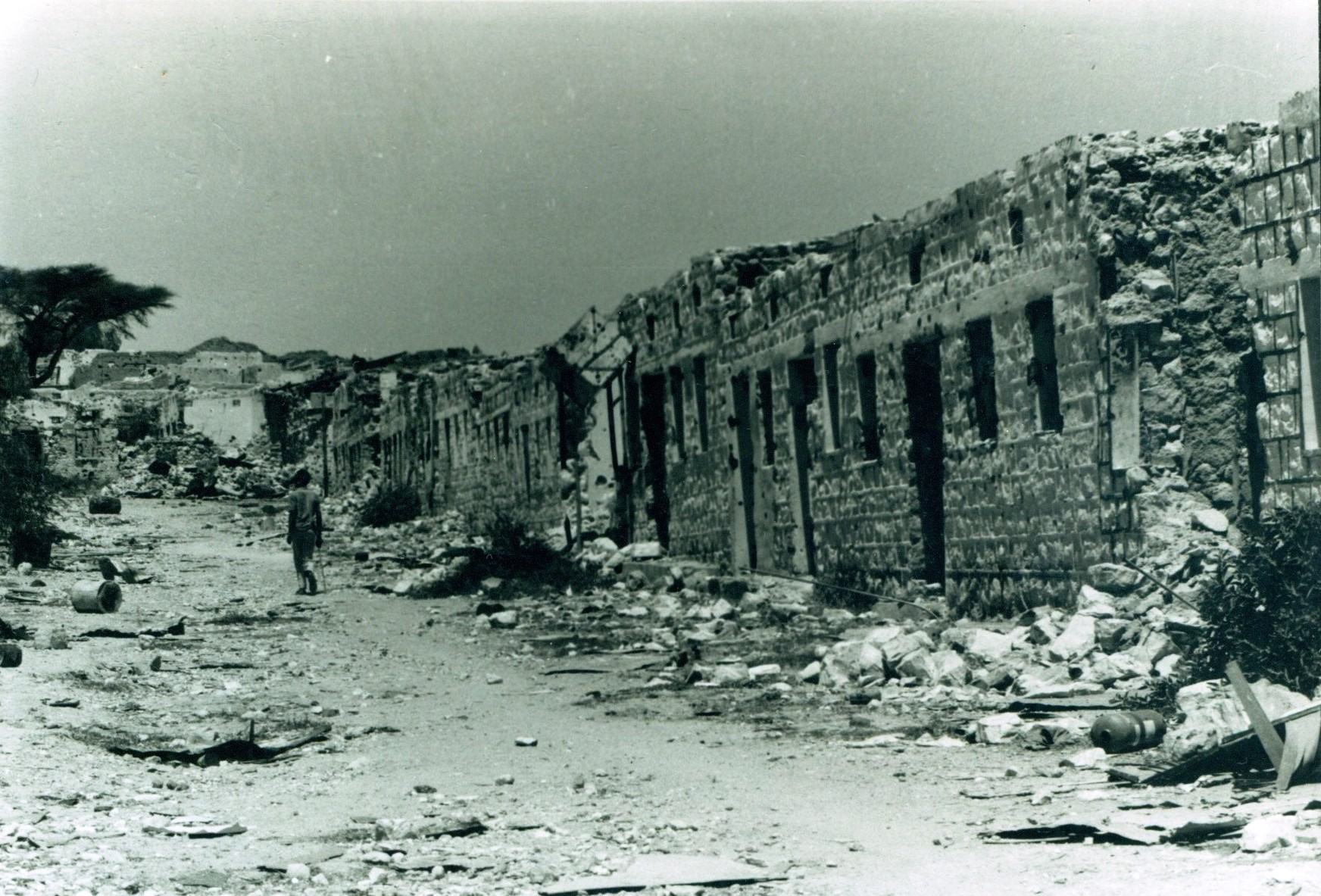
- Hargeisa after the bombardment campaign
Date	May–July 1988
Location	Hargeisa and Burao, Somaliland (then Northern Somalia)
Result	Somali Democratic Republic victory: 90% of Hargeisa destroyed; 70% of Burao destroyed; Civilian population devastated

Belligerents
Somalia	SNM

Commanders and leaders
Mohamed Siad Barre; Mohamed Said Hersi Morgan	Siilaanyo; Mohamed Farah Dalmar Yusuf †; Ibrahim Degaweyne; Mohamed Kahin Ahmed; Muse Bihi

Casualties and losses
Heavy	10,000–20,000 killed 500,000 displaced

The destruction of Hargeisa and Burao (Somali: duqayntii Hargeysa iyo Burco) occurred in 1988 during the Somaliland War of Independence. It was part of a counteroffensive launched by the Somali government under President Mohamed Siad Barre against the Somali National Movement (SNM), an opposition group active in northern Somalia (modern-day Somaliland).

The campaign involved indiscriminate aerial bombardments and ground assaults on the cities of Hargeisa and Burao, resulting in large-scale destruction and civilian casualties. It is estimated that 90% of Hargeisa and 70% of Burao were destroyed, displacing hundreds of thousands of civilians.

== Background ==
Throughout the 1980s, civil conflict proliferated throughout the Somali Democratic Republic as domestic opposition against the regime of Siad Barre intensified. The Somali National Movement (SNM), composed primarily of members of the Isaaq clan, sought to overthrow the government and establish autonomy in the northern regions.

At the end of May 1988, the SNM force of around 10,000 men launched an offensive and captured key areas in the major urban centers of Hargeisa and Burao. In response, the Somali regime initiated a massive military operation to retake the cities and crush the rebellion.

== Destruction of Hargeisa ==
General Said Hersi Morgan of the Somali National Army ordered the bombing of Hargeisa.

The city of Hargeisa, home to approximately 500,000 people at the time, faced heavy aerial bombardments by the Somali Air Force. Residential neighborhoods, markets, and infrastructure were targeted indiscriminately. It is reported that 90% of the city was destroyed, with widespread civilian casualties. Survivors described the city as being "reduced to rubble," with entire neighborhoods leveled. The destruction caused mass displacement, with most residents fleeing to refugee camps in neighboring Ethiopia. Some 5,000 civilians reportedly died in the northern part of the city which had suffered heavy shelling.

Some Somali Air Force pilots deserted rather than carry out attack on their own cities.

== Battle and Bombing of Burao ==
The SNM successfully captured the city of Burao on May 27, 1988, marking a significant victory for the group. However, the Somali regime retaliated by conducting aerial bombardments and artillery strikes, destroying 70% of the city's infrastructure. The destruction resulted in widespread loss of civilian life and the death of Mohamed Ali, a key SNM leader who played a prominent role in the battle.

== Aftermath ==
The destruction of Hargeisa and Burao had a catastrophic impact on northern Somalia.

- Estimates place the civilian death toll between 50,000 and 100,000.
- The widespread destruction displaced hundreds of thousands of people, many of whom fled to refugee camps in Ethiopia.
- The events of 1988 are recognized as war crimes, with Colonel Morgan and the Siad Barre regime blamed for their roles in the atrocities.
