= Abdullahi Boos Ahmed =

Somali politician

Minister of Posts and Telecommunications of Somalia
- Incumbent
- Assumed office 12 January 2015
- Prime Minister: Omar Abdirashid Ali Sharmarke

Personal details
- Born: Somalia
- Party: Independent

Abdullahi Boos Ahmed is a Somali politician.

He was appointed Minister of Defence in the transitional government from August 2009 to 2010. He was the Minister of Posts and Telecommunications of Somalia, appointed to the position on 12 January 2015 by Prime Minister Omar Abdirashid Ali Sharmarke.
