= Aden Isaq Ahmed =

Somali politician (born 1923)

Honorable Aden Isaq Ahmed Aden Isaaq Axmed أدن اساق أحمد
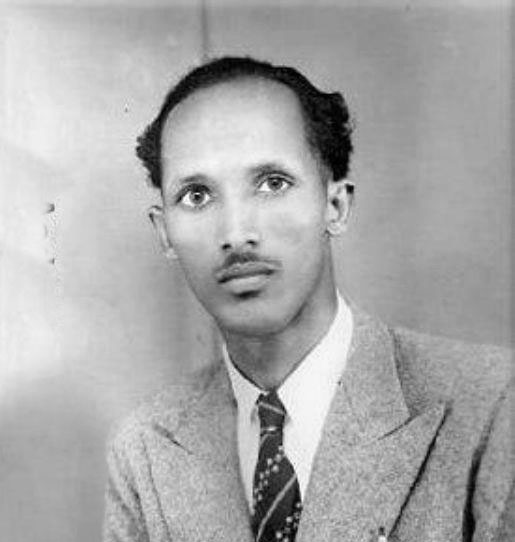

Minister of Public Education
- In office 1967–1969

Minister of Transportation & Communication
- In office 1966–1967

Minister of Defence
- In office 1964–1966
- Preceded by: Hilowle Moalin Mohamed
- Succeeded by: Abdirahman Haji Mumin

First Secretary (Senior Diplomat) under the Somali Ambassador of Moscow
- In office 1961–1963

Personal details
- Born: 1923 Awdal, British Somaliland (present-day Awdal, Somaliland)
- Died: 1989 (age 66-67)
- Profession: Statesman, Minister, Deputy Prime Minister and politician

Aden Isaq Ahmed (Somali: Aden Isaaq Axmed, Arabic: أدن اساق أحمد; 1923–1999) was a Somali politician and statesman who served as the Deputy Prime Minister of Somalia in the 1960s.

== History ==
Aden born in Awdal in 1923, he belonged to the Rer Ahamed (Reer Axamed), Gibril Yunus (Jibril Yoonis), Makahiil (Makahiil) section of the Gadabursi (Gadabuursi) or Samaron (Samaroon) clan. He served his country the Somali Republic as a Senior Diplomat in Moscow and was the second Somali man ever to set foot in the Russian capital. After arriving back in Somalia he took part in the elections to become a minister of parliament. He succeeded and served as the Minister of Defense, Minister of Transportation & Communication, Minister of Education. Prior to that he studied at the University of Oxford.

=== Career ===
- First Secretary (Senior Diplomat) under the Somali Ambassador of Moscow (1961–1963)
- Minister of Defence (1964–1966)
- Minister of Transportation & Communication (1966–1967)
- Minister of Public Education (1967–1969)
- Deputy Prime Minister of Somalia (1969)
- Somali Ambassador in Pakistan (1976–1984)
- Somali Ambassador in Oman (1984–1988)
