= Somali Police Force =

Law enforcement agency

Ciidanka Booliska Soomaaliya Somali Police Force قوات الشرطة الصومالية
- Logo of the Somali Police Force

- Flag of the Somali Police Force
- Abbreviation: SPF
- Motto: Kahortag iyo U adeegid (English: Protect and Serve)

Agency overview
- Formed: 1960; 66 years ago
- Preceding agency: Police Corps of Somalia (1910–1960)

Jurisdictional structure
- National agency: Somalia
- Operations jurisdiction: Somalia
- Governing body: Government of Somalia
- General nature: Local civilian police

Operational structure
- Headquarters: Mogadishu, Somalia
- Elected officer responsible: General Asad Osman Abdullahi, Ministry of Internal Security (Somalia)
- Agency executive: Maj General Asad Osman Abdullahi, Police Commissioner
- Divisions: 11: Criminal Investigation Division; Tributary Division; Traffic Division; Communications Unit; Training Unit; Women's Unit; Transport Department; Health Service; Somali Custodial Corps; Fire Brigade; Riot Unit; Rapid Response Team

Website
- police.gov.so

The Somali Police Force (SPF; Somali: Ciidanka Booliska Soomaaliyeed (CBS); Arabic: قوات الشرطة الصومالية, romanized: Qūwat al-Shurṭah al-Ṣūmālīyah) is the national police force and the main civil law enforcement agency of Somalia. As with most other police forces in the world, its duties include crime fighting, traffic control, maintaining public safety, counter-terrorism. It is under the jurisdiction of the Minister of Internal Security.

It served from 1960 to 1991 as one of the principal organs of the Somali Armed Forces and upon reorganisation distanced itself away from the Armed Forces. While organised at a national level, each arm reports to a county police authority, which in turn divides its force by local Police Divisions, headquartered at local police stations; the police force was later reconstituted at the start of the 21st century.

In an emergency, the police can be reached by dialing 991 from any telephone in Somalia.

== History ==
In 1884 the British formed an armed constabulary to police the Somaliland coast. In 1910 the British created the Somaliland Coastal Police, and in 1912 they established the Somaliland Camel Corps to police the interior.

In 1926 the colonial authorities formed the Somaliland Police Force. Commanded by British officers, the force included Somalis in its lower ranks. Armed rural constabulary (XirXiran) supported this force by bringing offenders to court, guarding prisoners, patrolling townships, and accompanying nomadic tribesmen over grazing areas.

In 1960, the British Somaliland Somaliland Scouts joined with the (Police Corps of Somalia) (1910–1960) to form a new Somali Police Force, which consisted of about 3,700 men. The authorities also organized approximately 1,000 of the force as the Daraawishta Booliska, a mobile group used to keep peace between warring clans in the interior. Until 1991, the government considered the SPF a part of the armed forces. In its inception in 1960, Mohamed Abshir Muse became the first commander of the police force.

In 1961, the SPF established an air wing, equipped with Cessna light aircraft and one Douglas DC-3. The unit operated from improvised landing fields near remote police posts. The wing provided assistance to field police units and to the Daraawishta through the airlift of supplies and personnel and reconnaissance. During the final days of Barre's regime, the air wing operated two Cessna light aircraft and two DO-28 Skyservants.

The late President of Somalia Siad Barre was among the senior officers and commanders formed under the colonial forces who led the Somali Police Force and Somali National Army after independence in 1960.

Under the parliamentary regime, police received training and material aid from West Germany, Italy, and the United States. Although the government used the police to counterbalance the Soviet-supported army, no police commander opposed the 1969 army coup.

Until its dissolution in 1976, the Ministry of Interior oversaw the Force's national commandant and his central command. After that date, the SPF came under the control of the presidential adviser on security affairs.

During the 1970s, German Democratic Republic (East Germany) security advisers assisted the SPF. After relations with the West improved in the late 1970s, West German and Italian advisers again started training police units.

Each of the country's administrative regions had a police commandant; other commissioned officers maintained law and order in the districts. After 1972, the police outside Mogadishu comprised northern and southern group commands, divisional commands (corresponding to the districts), station commands, and police posts. Regional governors and district commissioners commanded regional and district police elements.

Technical and specialized police units included the Tributary Division, the Criminal Investigation Division (CID), the Traffic Division, a Communications Unit, and a Training Unit.

By the late 1970s, the SPF was carrying out an array of missions, including patrol work, traffic management, criminal investigation, intelligence gathering, and counter-insurgency. The elite mobile police groups consisted of the Daraawishta and the Birmadka Booliska (Riot Unit). The Birmadka acted as a crack unit for emergency action and provided honor guards for ceremonial functions.

The Daraawishta, a mobile unit that operated in remote areas and along the frontier, participated in the Ogaden War.

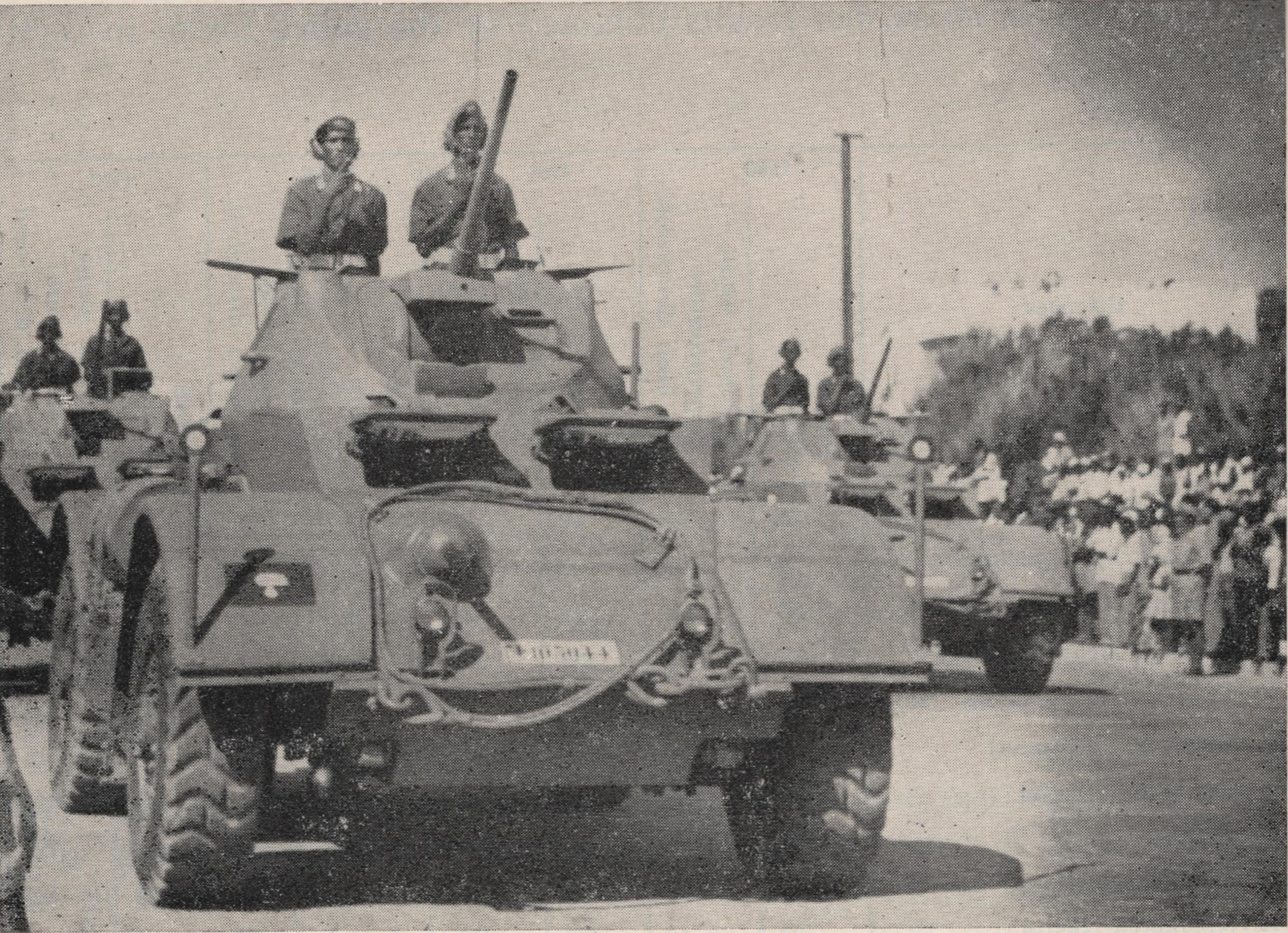
A Staghound armoured car of the Somali Police (probably Darawiishta) on parade sometime in the 1960-63 period

After the collapse of the Barre government and the outbreak of the Somali Civil War in 1991, both the Daraawishta and Birmadka forces essentially ceased to operate.

== Re-establishment ==
With the start of the 21st century, a new police force was re-established by the TFG. The Armo Police Academy, the first such training institute to be built in Somalia for decades, opened on December 20, 2005, at Armo, 100 kilometres south of Bosaso. The new Police force was funded by the UN.

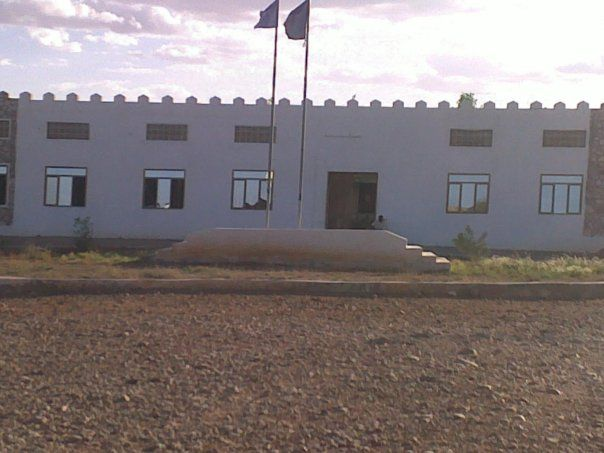
The First Somali Police Academy of Armo in Armo District.

Stig Jarle Hansen argued in 2007 that although the UNDP was financially supported by the governments of the United States and Norway, it repeatedly failed to ensure payment to the Somali police force that it at the time provided training to. This led to a high desertion rate of over 100%, as a majority of unpaid TFG policemen and soldiers abandoned their posts after only a few months of training. The UNDP's unsuccessful rule of law project and TFG policies created a situation whereby the soldiers who remained in service then resorted to pillaging and theft to sustain themselves, and squabbled over the little funds that were earmarked for them.

On 17 June 2009, Mogadishu's police chief Colonel Ali Said was killed during an attack on insurgent bases in the capital.

In June 2011, the Somali Police Force was given the responsibility of security in Km 4, Guriga Shaqalaha, Isgoyska Dabka and Makka Almukara road. The police also established posts in all of the Transitional Federal Government-controlled districts of Mogadishu.

Since Al-Shabaab was evicted from the capital in August 2011, the SPF is headquartered in Mogadishu and officers are trained locally. According to Police Commissioner Maya, the SPF expected to have an independent, fully established and well-equipped force following the end of the transitional period in August 2012. Turkey has also offered to train SPF officials to strengthen the police's enforcement capacity.

The United Nations Secretary General reported in January 2013 that :

"The United Nations continued to support the activities of the Somali Police Force, including the formulation of a strategic development plan. UNPOS facilitated the procurement of equipment and furniture for 10 police stations in Mogadishu and police headquarters and provided training to 38 Somali Police Force drivers and 5 fleet managers. UNDP continued to pay police stipends to 5,388 Somali Police Force officers on duty in Mogadishu, Baidoa and Galmudug, courtesy of the Government of Japan and the European Union. A total of 4,463 Somali Police Force officers were registered in Mogadishu using the biometric registration system, completing the registration for the capital."

As of August 2014, the Federal Government of Somalia was engaged in capacity-rebuilding for the SPF, with assistance provided by the U.S. Bureau for International Narcotics and Law Enforcement Affairs, the European Union Training Mission Somalia and the United Nations Mine Action Service.

UNDP continued to disburse stipends for the Somali Police Force until December 2015, through the support of the Government of Japan and the European Union.

== Training ==
As of January 2025, the SPC has two training academies, the first one in Armo near Bosaso in Puntland, and the second one in Mogadishu named General Kahiye Police Academy.

In May 2023, major renovations of General Kahiye Police Academy had begun. In February 2025, the commander of the SPF Asad Osman Abdullahi conducted a working inspection of the academy in Mogadishu which was still undergoing renovations.

== Structure ==
=== Criminal Investigation Division (CID) ===
The CID, which can operate throughout the country, handled investigations, fingerprinting and criminal records.

The Criminal Investigation Department is fully part of the Somali Police Force and is headquartered in Mogadishu with some 180 officers (and 27 in the stations).

The department is headed by a Director and a Deputy, who are assisted in their HQ by the directors of six CID divisions.

Since 2019, the United Nations Office on Drugs and Crime (UNODC) has been assisting the CID to train investigators and establish and support specialized units through the UNODC Criminal Investigation Program for Somalia funded by the United States Department of State Bureau for International Narcotics and Law Enforcement Affairs.

The objective of the Program is to enhance the investigation capacity of the Somali Police Force and CID, both at the Federal and Federal Member State level, to investigate serious and organized crime in accordance with international treaty obligations and standards, including the United Nations Convention against Transnational Organized Crime and the Protocols Thereto..

The SPF also has a Criminal Investigative Division (CID) in Mogadishu.

=== Somali Coast Guard ===
The SPF is currently only one of the two southern Somali institutions which has legal authority for maritime law enforcement, the other being the Somali Navy, up to 200 Nautical miles from the coastline, and has tried to maintain its maritime law enforcement role.

Six long-range patrol vessels (LRPVs) were ordered from Atlantic Marine and Offshore Group in July 2013 as part of a larger contract to build up the Somali Coast Guard. They were expected to be delivered by the end of the year. It was reported that the Atlantic Marine and Offshore Group would build, maintain and operate the coast guard fleet and would develop a coast guard training centre to train coast guard personnel, security officers and shore based support personnel. In Mogadishu the Atlantic Marine and Offshore Group were reported to be planning to establish an operational base, including a ship repair facility.

Six Damen Stan 5009 patrol vessel long-range patrol vessels were ordered for Somalia in 2014. They will be equipped with high-speed off-shore interceptor boats.

Somali Coast Guard operations will be managed in coordination with the Somali Coastguard Directorate.

=== EOD – explosive ordnance disposal unit ===
The SPF EOD counts 86 SPF officers in total and has benefited from several recent projects, mainly initiated and delivered by UNMAS.

In April 2014, the Government of Somalia in conjunction with the European Union Training Mission Somalia and the United Nations Mine Action Service trained the first ever Somali Police Explosive Ordnance Disposal teams.

=== Traffic Police Department ===
The SPF Traffic Police unit counts 140 officers and performs the for such unit usual tasks as well as the official escorts e.g. with motorcycles.

Traffic officers do operate in conditions that are not to underestimate as they are visible beacons of the authority, against whom Al Shabaab has directed specific threats in the past.

In 1961, the SPF established a Women's Unit. Personnel assigned to this small unit investigated, inspected, and interrogated female offenders and victims. Policewomen also handled cases that involved female juvenile delinquents, ill or abandoned girls, prostitutes, and child beggars.

Service units of the Somali police included the Gaadiidka Booliska (Transport Department) and the Health Service. The Police Custodial Corps served as prison guards. In 1971, the SPF created a fifty-man national Fire Brigade. Initially, the Fire Brigade operated in Mogadishu. Later, however, it expanded its activities into other towns, including Kismayo, Hargeisa, Berbera, Merca, Jowhar and Beledweyne.

=== Haramad Special Police Force ===
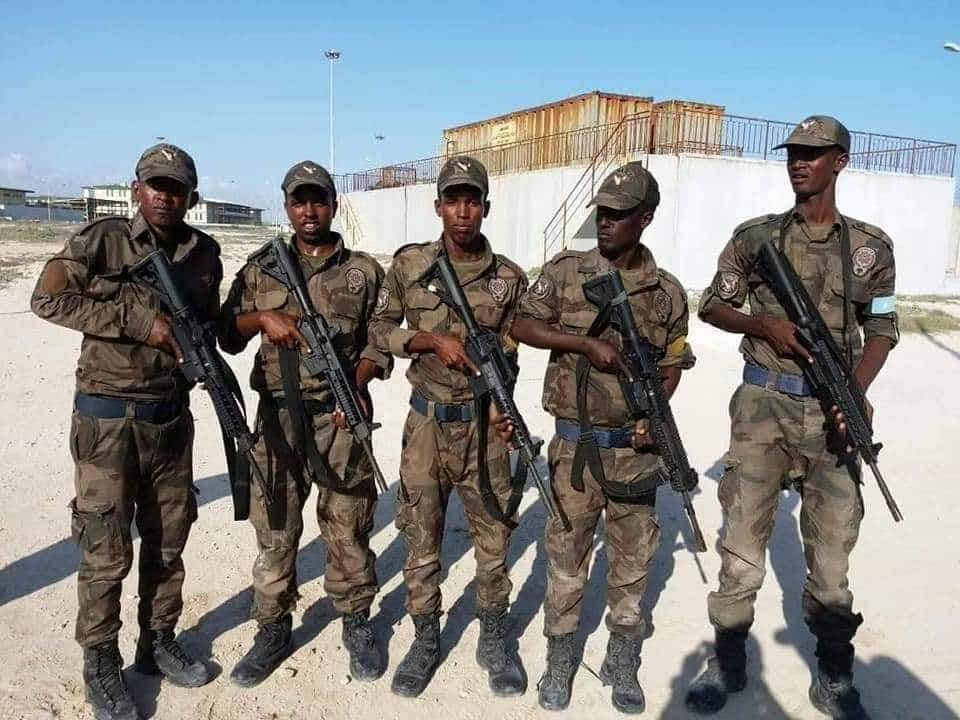
Somali Police Special Operations Battalion officer's known as Cheetah Commando's Haramcad, patrolling the Mogadishu Green Zone, the site of several highly sensitive sites such the International Airport, several embassies, as well as the headquarters of the UN in Somalia.

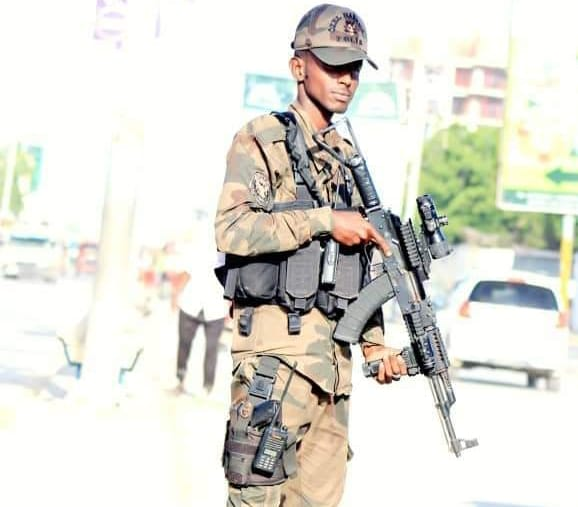
A Cheetah Commando officer man's a police check point during the Eid Holidays 2019 in Mogadishu, Somalia.

This Special Operations Command Battalion known as Ciidanka Booliska Gaarka ah ee Haramcad in Somali (Cheetah Unit), was inaugurated in March 2019 after the first company of 120 police cadets of a force that is envisage to number between 600 and 800 men, graduated from the Mountain Commando School and Training Center, in Isparta Turkey in February 2019.

This unit has several responsibilities, to assist the Somali National Army in Counter-Insurgency operations in urban areas of Somalia, as a mobile reserve force, to pacify & police areas captured by the SNA allowing it to focus on its primary mandate in the short term of destroying Al-Shabaab as a fighting force in Somalia.

As well as providing security for critical installations & infrastructure such as the Aden Adde International Airport in Mogadishu, and the Green Zone, as well as providing security to large public gathering's such as football fans during as Somali Football league match.

== Personnel and training ==
Beginning in the early 1970s, police recruits had to be seventeen to twenty-five years of age, of high moral caliber, and physically fit. Upon completion of six months of training at the National Police Academy in Mogadishu, those who passed an examination would serve two years on the force.

After the recruits completed this service, the police could request renewal of their contracts. Officer cadets underwent a nine-month training course that emphasized supervision of police field performance.

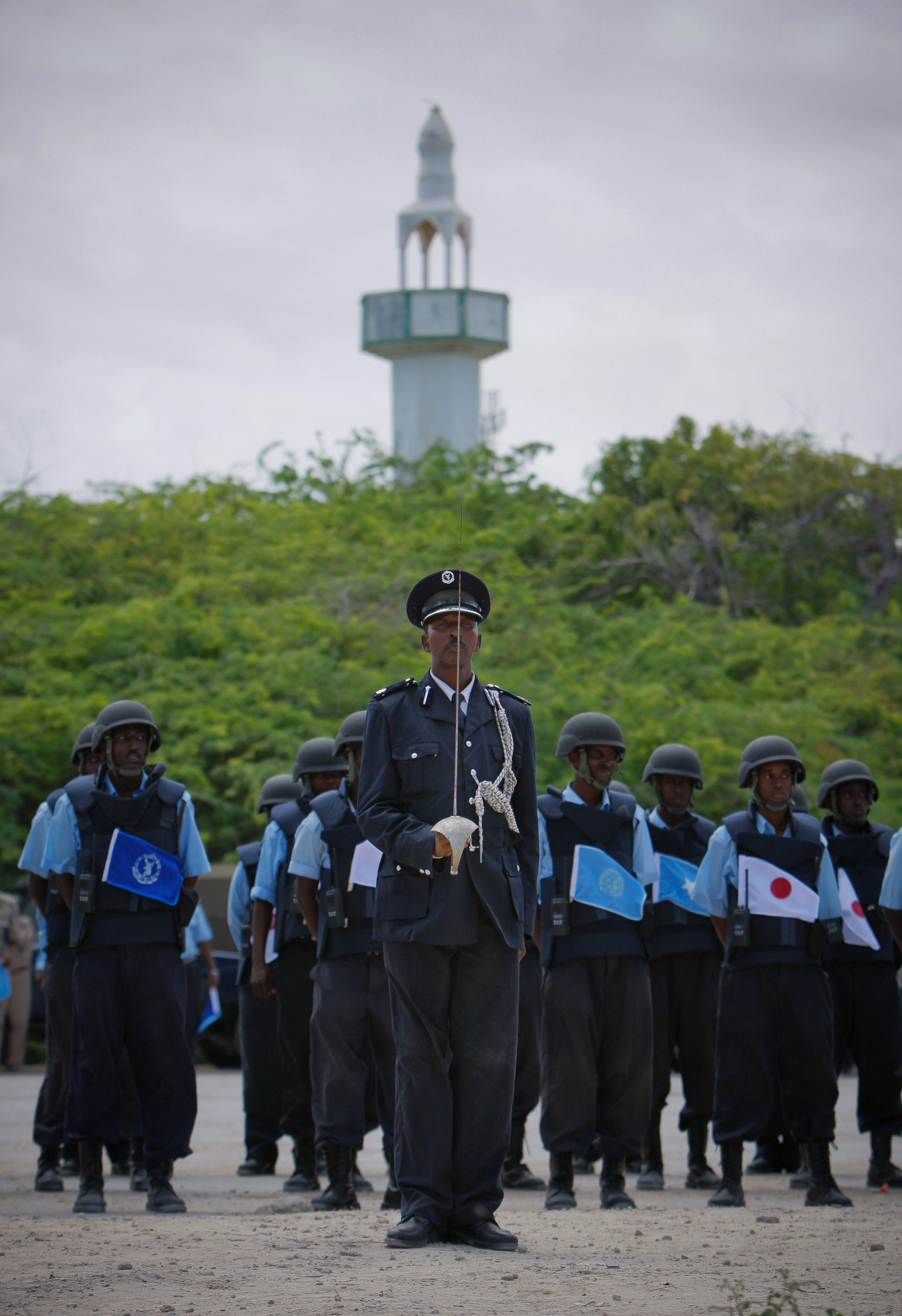
Somali Police Parade

Daraawishta members, or modern Dervishes, attended a six-month tactical training course. Birmaadka personnel received training in public order and riot control.

=== Heegan Strategic Police Plan ===
The overall vision of the Heegan plan is to support Somali Police Force (SPF) in a first time to establish basic police services in all the areas, second to upgrade the as such existing capacity of the SPF throughout the country, through reform, restructuring in a new policing model, with a new legal framework, while rehabilitating the specialized police services to their full operational potential, ensuring now the delivery of complete policing services for the Somali population.

The objective of the Heegan plan is to develop a realistic police plan under the Somali National Development Plan, linked with short, medium and longer-term Rule of Law programmes and in line with the federal vision, taking into account existing Somali and international police plans and projects. It aims at bringing together and prioritizing by urgency, all support provided under multiple instruments.

The Heegan plan should support the SPF to

- Rebuild the field capability of police forces in the reconquered territories and throughout the country, so that police officers get the necessary tools and skills to legally, safely and quickly fulfill their expected normal roles and duties.
- Deploy and establish sufficient police capacity in the reconquered territories, in order to release the military from their temporary role of ensuring security in the villages and towns that have been reconquered.
- Further continue to develop the skills capability of the Somali Police Force throughout the whole country so that officers can reliably undertake the full range of basic and more specialized tasks.

==== Uniform ====
The Somali Police Force and the Somali Custodial Corps wear different coloured berets, with police wearing blue berets and the Corps wearing green berets, also the beret pin for the police is silver and generally the beret pin for the Corps is gold. The police deploys several uniforms stylized after those from the armed forces (as the Police was and could be currently considered a branch of the armed forces as they do use woodland camouflage uniforms and have ranks with militaristic names and even has blue accents on the rank badges as opposed to the Army's red). Mainly the standard city police uses blue shirts, blue berets and black trousers and dress shoes with black shoulder boards whilst the Custodial Corps have a more militarised standard uniform with a khaki shirt and trousers with black dress shoes, however green shoulder boards are not generally worn, but are for more formal events like the founding of the armed forces and Independence Day.

== Agreements ==
In February 2014, a visiting delegation from Somalia led by Prime Minister Abdiweli Sheikh Ahmed met in Addis Ababa with Prime Minister of Ethiopia Hailemariam Desalegn to discuss strengthening bilateral relations between the two countries. Hailemariam Desalegn pledged his administration's continued support for the peace and stabilization efforts in Somalia, as well as its preparedness to assist in initiatives aiming to build up the Somali security forces through experience-sharing and training. The meeting concluded with a tripartite memorandum of understanding agreeing to promote partnership and cooperation, including a cooperative agreement to develop the police force.

In August 2014, the Somali and U.S. governments reached an agreement in Washington, D.C. stipulating that the United States would contribute $1.9 million toward security sector reform, development and capacity-building efforts in Somalia. The pact was signed by Finance Minister of Somalia Hussein Abdi Halane, U.S. Special Representative for Somalia James P. McAnulty, and Deputy Assistant Secretary for the Bureau for International Narcotics and Law Enforcement Affairs (INL) Todd Robinson. It is primarily slated to provide support to the Somali National Police Force's Criminal Investigative Division (CID), with an emphasis on implementing policies, practices and procedures that buttress citizen services and human rights. The INL will fund the initiative. The treaty is the second of its kind between the Somali government and INL.

In January 2015, Foreign Affairs Minister of Somalia Abdirahman Duale Beyle and a Turkish delegation signed a bilateral treaty in Mogadishu pertaining to police support.

== Equipment ==
=== Current police vehicles inventory ===
Somali Police vehicles have two liveries, white with blue doors and a solid blue colour with Police insignia and 888 displayed.

Name	Origin	Type	Ref
Suzuki DR 200	Japan	Dual-sport motorcycle	
Ford F150	United States	Pickup truck	
Toyota Hilux	Japan	Pickup truck	
Toyota Land Cruiser	Japan	Sport utility vehicle	
Volvo V70	Sweden	Station wagon	
Toyota ToyoAce	Japan	Prisoner transport vehicle	
Volkswagen Passat	Germany	Unmarked police car	
BMW M3	Germany	Unmarked police car	
MAN TGM Firetruck	Germany	Fire engine	

== Leadership ==
=== Chief of the Somali Police ===
Name	Took office	Left office	Note
General Abdi Hasan Awale "Qeybdiid"			
General Ashkir Abdi Faarah ''Jijiile''	5 January 1967	11 December 1994	Gobalka Galgaduud
General Ali Mohamed Hassan "Ali Madobe"		30 March 2011	
General Shariif Sheekhuna Maye	30 March 2011		
General Abdihakim Dahir Said "Saacid"	20 May 2013	9 July 2014	
General Mohamed Sheikh Ismail	9 July 2014	30 October 2014	
General Osman Omar Wehliye	30 October 2014	30 April 2015	Interim Police Chief
General Mohamed Sheikh Hassan	30 April 2015	5 April 2017	

=== Commissioners of the Somali Police ===
Name	Took office	Left office	Note
General Ali Hassan Mohamed "Looyaan"		16 March 2011	Replaced
General Osman Omar Wehliye	16 March 2011	30 October 2014	

The current Somali Federal Police Commissioner appointed in June 2018 is Brigadier General Bashir Abdi Mohamed "AMEERIKO", his is a 32-year Police Force veteran and was previously Director of the Criminal Investigation Department

.

== See also ==
- National Intelligence and Security Agency
- Somali Custodial Corps
