= Informal Preparatory Meeting on National Reconciliation =

A United Nations Economic Commission for Africa-sponsored meeting held in Addis Ababa, Ethiopia, January 4–8, 1993. Its purpose was to attempt to settle differences between the warring factions of the Somali Civil War. It led to a formal agreement at the Conference on National Reconciliation in Somalia, but factional fighting continued mostly unabated.

== Representatives ==
Organization	Representative Chairmen
Somali Africans Muki Organization (SAMO)	Mohamed Ramadan Arbow
Somali Democratic Alliance (SDA)	Mohamed Farah Abdullahi
Somali Democratic Movement (SDM)	Abdi Muse Mayow
Somali National Alliance (SNA)	Col. Mohamed Nur Aliyou
Somali National Democratic Union (SNDU)	Ali Ismael Abdi
Somali National Front (SNF)	General Omar Hagi Mohamed Hersi
Somali National Union (SNU)	Dr. Mohamed Ragis Mohamed
Somali Patriotic Movement (SPM)	General Aden Abdillahi Noor
Somali Patriotic Movement (SPM) (sna)	Col. Ahmed Omar Jess
Somali Salvation Democratic Front (SSDF)	General Mohamed Abshir Musse
Southern Somali National Movement (SSNM) (sna)	Col. Abdi Warsame Isaaq
United Somali Congress (USC) (sna)	General Mohamed Farah Aidid
United Somali Congress (USC)	Mohamed Qanyare Afrah
United Somali Front (USF)	Abdurahman Dualeh Ali
United Somali Party (USP)	Mohamed Abdi Hashi
