= Osman Omar Wehliye =

General Osman Omar Wehliye ًعثمان عمر ًآةآلئيآ

Chief of the Somali Police Force Interim
- In office 30 October 2014 – 30 April 2015
- Prime Minister: Abdiweli Sheikh Ahmed
- Preceded by: Mohamed Sheikh Ismail
- Succeeded by: Mohamed Sheikh Hassan

Commissioner of the Somali Police Force
- In office 16 March 2011 – 30 October 2014
- Prime Minister: Abdiweli Sheikh Ahmed; Abdi Farah Shirdon; Abdiweli Mohamed Ali
- Preceded by: Ali Hassan Mohamed

Personal details
- Party: Independent

General Osman Omar Wehliye "Gas-Gas" (Somali: Cismaan Cumaar Wehliye, Arabic: ًعثمان عمر ًآةآلئيآ) is a Somali military commander.

== Career ==
From March 2011 to October 2014, Wehliye served as the Commissioner of the Somali Police Force.

On 30 October 2014, he was appointed Interim Police Chief by Prime Minister Abdiweli Sheikh Ahmed, following the sudden death of former Police Chief Mohamed Sheikh Ismail. Wehliye's term as Police Commissioner ended on 30 April 2015, when Prime Minister Omar Abdirashid Ali Sharmarke appointed Mohamed Sheikh Hassan as the permanent Chief of Police.
