= Abdullahi Osman Agey =

Somali military commander

Abdullahi Osman Agey عبد الله عثمان إغآي
- Allegiance: Federal Government of Somalia
- Branch: Somali National Army
- Rank: General
- Commands: Deputy Chief of Army

General Abdullahi Osman Agey (Somali: Cabdulaahi Cismaan Cagey, Arabic: عبد الله عثمان إغآي) is a Somali military commander. He is the Deputy Chief of the Somali National Army, having been appointed to the position on 25 June 2014 in place of General Abdirisaq Khalif Hussein. General Abdullahi Anod was concurrently named as the new Chief of Army.
