= Mohamed Sheikh Ismail =

Mohamed Sheikh Ismail محمد الشيخ إسماعيل

Chief of the Somali Police Force
- In office 9 July 2014 – 30 October 2014
- Prime Minister: Abdiweli Sheikh Ahmed
- Preceded by: Abdihakim Said
- Succeeded by: Osman Omar Wehliye

Personal details
- Born: Somalia
- Died: 30 October 2014 Mogadishu, Somalia
- Party: Independent

Brigadier General Mohamed Sheikh Ismail (Somali: Maxamed Sheekh Ismaciil, Arabic: محمد الشيخ إسماعيل) was a Somali military commander. He served as the Chief of the Somali Police Force from July to October 2014.

== Career ==
On 9 July 2014, Ismail was appointed Chief of the Somali Police Force by Prime Minister Abdiweli Sheikh Ahmed. He succeeded Abdihakim Dahir Said in office.

In October 2014, Ismail was hospitalized at the Digfer Hospital in Mogadishu due to irregular blood circulation and pain. He died later in the month on 30 October of an apparent heart attack. President of Somalia Hassan Sheikh Mohamud, Prime Minister Abdiweli Sheikh Ahmed, and Federal Parliament Speaker Mohamed Osman Jawari all expressed their condolences to Ismail's family, noting that the late General was a nationalist figure. Mohamud also indicated that the federal government would arrange a state funeral service in the capital for Ismail.

Additionally, Ahmed announced that a five-member ministerial committee led by Religious Affairs Minister and Deputy Prime Minister Ridwan Hirsi Mohamed was established to investigate the circumstances of Ismail's sudden death. Senior Somali police officials subsequently flew Ismail's body out to Nairobi for an autopsy by high-level experts. Government officials indicated that the mysterious and rapid nature of the General's illness suggested that he was possibly poisoned. As part of their ongoing investigations, the police interrogated a restaurant owner whose establishment Ismail had visited the day before his death. They also arrested all of the medical personnel that were on duty during the General's hospitalization, including a physician and a nurse who had treated him. Ismail's body was later returned to Mogadishu for a state funeral.

On 30 October 2014, Prime Minister Ahmed appointed Ismail's deputy Osman Omar Wehliye (Gas Gas) as the Interim Police Chief.
