= Addis Ababa Agreement (1993) =

The Addis Ababa Agreement was a settlement reached at the 1993 Conference on National Reconciliation in Somalia.
