= Abdihakim Mohamoud Haji-Faqi =

Somali politician

Abdihakim Mohamoud Haji-Faqi عبد الحكيم محمود حاجي الفقي
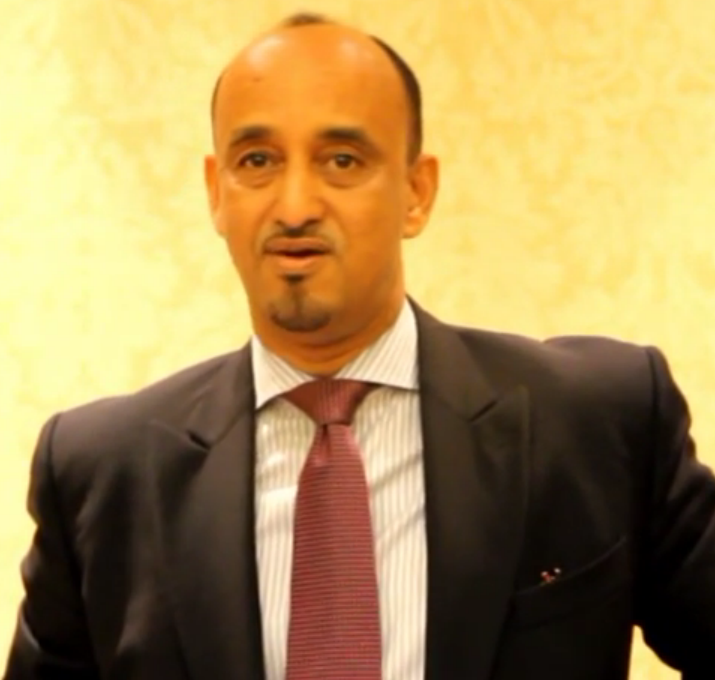

Minister of Defence of Somalia
- In office 4 November 2012 – 17 January 2014
- Preceded by: Hussein Arab Isse
- Succeeded by: Mohamed Sheikh Hassan
- In office 12 November 2010 – 20 July 2011
- Preceded by: Mohamed Abdi Gandhi
- Succeeded by: Hussein Arab Isse

Deputy Prime Minister of Somalia
- In office 12 November 2010 – 20 July 2011
- Succeeded by: Hussein Arab Isse

Personal details
- Born: Bay, Somalia
- Party: Independent

Abdihakim Mohamoud Haji-Faqi (Somali: Cabdixakiin Maxamuud Xaaji Fiqi, Arabic: عبد الحكيم محمود حاجي الفقي), also spelled Abdulhakim Mahamud Fiqi, is a Somali diplomat and politician. He twice served as the Minister of Defence of Somalia.

== Personal life ==
Haji-Faqi hails from the Bay region in southern Somalia. He belongs to the Dabarre sub group of the Rahanweyn clan.

Haji-Faqi was previously a diplomat in Canada.

== Career ==
On 12 November 2010, Haji-Faqi was appointed Minister of Defence of Somalia. He was also serving as one of three national deputy prime ministers of Somalia. His term as Defence Minister came to an end on 20 July 2011.

On 4 November 2012, Haji-Faqi was appointed Minister of Defence for a second time by the new Prime Minister, Abdi Farah Shirdon.

Among his first initiatives in office, Haji-Faqi led negotiations helping to secure the Arab League's support for the Somali federal government's campaign to end the longstanding arms embargo on Somalia. The blockade was eventually lifted on 6 March 2013, following the United Nations Security Council's unanimous adoption of Resolution 2093.

Haji-Faqi's second term as Minister of Defence ended on 17 January 2014, when new Prime Minister Abdiweli Sheikh Ahmed appointed Mohamed Sheikh Hassan as his successor.
