= Abdirisaq Khalif Elmi =

Somali military leader

Abdirizak Khalif Elmi ععبد الرزاق خليف علمي
- Military career
- Allegiance: Federal Government of Somalia
- Branch: Somali National Army
- Rank: General
- Commands: Deputy Chief of Army

General Abdirizak Khalif Elmi (Somali: Cabdirisaaq Khaliif Ciilmi, Arabic: عبد الرزاق خليف علمي) is a Somali military commander. He is the Deputy Chief of the Somali National Army, having been appointed to the position on 13 March 2013 in place of Abdikarin Yusuf Dhega Badan.
