= Mohamed Farah Abdullahi =

Leader of Somali Democratic alliance

Mohamed Farah Abdullahi, also known as Hansharo (Somali: Xansharo), was the leader of the Somali Democratic Alliance.

== History ==
The Somali Democratic Alliance was a paramilitary organization in the north western areas of Somaliland also known as SDA. It was founded in 1989. It represented the Gadabursi tribe inside the borders of Somaliland. Not to be confused with the Gadabursi organization Horyal Democratic Front which opposed the Derg in the Ethiopian borders also belonging to the Gadabuursi tribe. The leader was Mohamed Farah Abdullahi also known as Hansharo.
