= Somali Revolutionary Socialist Party =

Ruling party of Somalia from 1976 to 1991

- Somali name: Xisbiga Hantiwadaagga Kacaanka Soomaaliyeed
- Arabic name: الحزب الاشتراكي الثوري الصومالي
- Abbreviation: SRSP (English); XHKS (Somali)
- General Secretary: Siad Barre
- Founder: Abdulrahman Dhabdhable
- Founded: 26 June 1976 (50 years, 98 days) (founding congress) 1 July 1976 (50 years, 93 days) (election of first Central Committee)
- Dissolved: 26 January 1991 (35 years, 249 days)
- Headquarters: Mogadishu
- Ideology: Communism; Marxism–Leninism; Scientific socialism Islamic socialism Somali nationalism
- Political position: Far-left
- Colours: Blue and Red
- People's Assembly (1984): 171 / 177 (97%)

Party flag
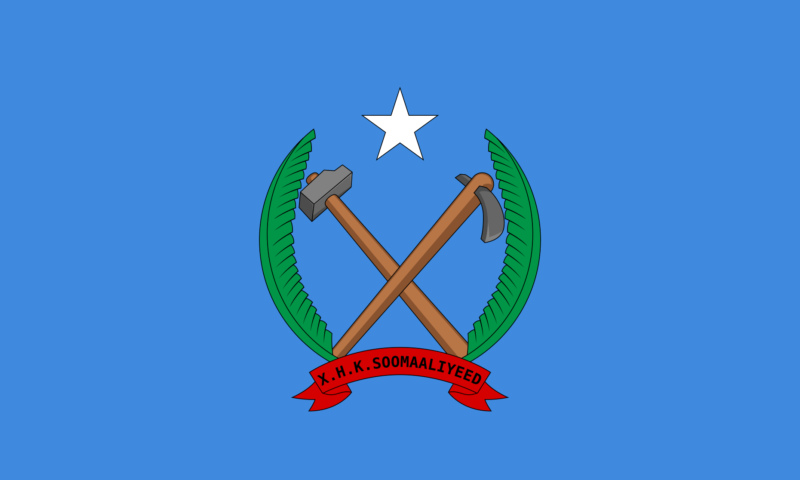

The Somali Revolutionary Socialist Party (SRSP, Somali: Xisbiga Hantiwadaagga Kacaanka Soomaaliyeed, XHKS, Arabic: الحزب الاشتراكي الثوري الصومالي, al-Ḥizb al-ishtirākī at-thawrī as-ṣūmālī) was the ruling party of the Somali Democratic Republic from 1976 to 1991.

== History ==
SRSP poster showing Ogaden as part of Greater Somalia

SRSP was created by the military regime of Siad Barre under Soviet guidance. A founding congress was held in June 1976. The congress elected a Central Committee, with Barre as the party general secretary. A five-member politburo, consisting of Barre, Lt. General Mohammad Ali Samatar (vice president), Major General Hussein Kulmiye Afrah (2nd vice president), Brig. Ahmad Sulaymaan Abdullah and Brig. Ismail Ali Abukor (who was later replaced by Brig. Ahmad Mahamuud Faarah) was constituted. Party cadres also included prominent socialists such as Abdi Hashi Abdullahi, Abdulrahman Aidiid, Mohamed F. Weyrah and (a well known socialist economist) and Abukar Sh. M Hussien.

During a brief period, prior to the escalation of conflict with Ethiopia in 1977, the SRSP developed relations with foreign communist parties, such as the Communist Party of the Soviet Union (CPSU) and Socialist Unity Party of Germany (SED). CPSU initiated a programme of assistance for the SRSP party school. After relations with the Eastern Bloc were ruptured, a group including SRSP CC member broke away to form splinter groups. This was even further accelerated by the failed military coup of April 9, 1978, popularly known as "Nova Aprile". In 1981 dissident factions would emerge as the Democratic Front for Salvation of Somalia.

When Barre's regime fell in 1991, the SRSP dissolved. In the same year the Somali National Front was organized by Barre loyalists.

SRSP poster

== Organisation ==
The SRSP was supposed to function as a political force transcending clan lines, but in reality there was little change in political practice. Power was concentrated to three clans. The party developed an intelligence branch, Baadhista xisbiga, which worked parallel to state intelligence and paramilitary groups. At most SRSP had around 20,000 members. The SRSP held its 3rd Congress in November 1986. A major reshuffle of the Central Committee took place.

== Role in Somali government ==
SRSP poster

The Seventh Article of the 1979 constitution of the Somali Democratic Republic clarified the role of the SRSP:

Authority and Leadership of the Party

1. The Somali Revolutionary Socialist Party shall be the only legal party in the Somali Democratic Republic; no other party or political organisation may be established.
2. The Somali Revolutionary Socialist party shall have supreme authority of political and socio-economic leadership in the Somali Democratic Republic.

== Congresses ==
No.	Date	Location
1st	27 June–3 July 1976	Mogadishu
Extraordinary	January 1979	Mogadishu
2nd	August 1982	Mogadishu
3rd	November 1986	Mogadishu

== Electoral history ==
=== Presidential elections ===
Election	Party candidate	Votes	%	Result
1980	Siad Barre	171	100%	Elected ✓
1986	Siad Barre	4,887,592	99.97%	Elected ✓

Note

After the 1979 election, the People's Assembly elected Barre President on 26 January 1980.

=== People's Assembly elections ===
Election	Party leader	Votes	%	Seats	+/–	Position	Result
1979	Siad Barre	3,982,532	99.95%	171 / 177	▲171	▲1st	Sole legal party
1984	Siad Barre	4,207,977	99.89%	171 / 177	Steady	1st	Sole legal party

== See also ==
- List of Islamic political parties
