= List of historical secret police organizations =

This is a list of historical secret police organizations. In most cases they are no longer current because the regime that ran them was overthrown or changed, or they changed their names. Few still exist under the same name as legitimate police forces.

== Agencies by country ==
=== Afghanistan ===
- Khedamat-e Etelea'at-e Dawlati (KHAD) (Government Intelligence Service), active in the Democratic Republic of Afghanistan
  - WAD

=== Albania ===
- Sigurimi (Directorate of State Security), active in the People's Socialist Republic of Albania

=== Algeria ===
- Département du Renseignement et de la Sécurité (Department of Intelligence and Security)

=== Angola ===
- Directorate of Information and Security of Angola (Direcção de Informação e Segurança de Angola) (DISA), active in the People's Republic of Angola

=== Argentina ===
- Sección Especial de Represión al Comunismo (SERC) (Special Section for the Repression of Communism)
- División de Información Política Antidemocrática (DIPA) (Political Anti-democratic Information Division)
- Secretariat of Intelligence (SIDE)

=== Austria ===
- Geheime Staatspolizei (Secret State Police), active in the Austrian Empire

=== Bangladesh ===
- Jatiya Rakkhi Bahini (JRB) (National Defense Force) was a Bangladeshi para-military force formed in 1972 by the Sheikh Mujibur Rahman government.

Initially formed to curb the insurgency and maintain law and order the force became involved in numerous charges of human rights abuse including political killings, shooting by death squads, and rape. It was seen as the armed wing of the ruling Awami League and it swore an oath of loyalty to Sheikh Mujibur Rahman. The Force was disbanded and merged with the Bangladesh Army following the August 15th 1975 coup which dislodged Sheikh Mujibur Rahman from power.

=== Bolivia ===
- Servicio Especial de Seguridad (SES) (Special Security Service)

=== Brazil ===
- 4th Auxiliary Police Bureau
- Departamento de Ordem Política e Social (DOPS) (Department of Political and Social Order), active during the Estado Novo (1937-1946) and the military dictatorship (1964–1985)
- Departamento de Operações Internas-Centro de Operações de Defesa Interna (DOI-CODI) (Internal Operations Department-Centre for Internal Defence Operations), active during the military dictatorship (1964–1985)

=== Bulgaria ===
- Komitet za dǎržavna sigurnost (KDS) (The Committee for State Security), most commonly referred to as the State Security, or DS, active in the People's Republic of Bulgaria

=== Cambodia ===
- Santebal – secret police during the Khmer Rouge period

=== Cameroon ===
- Centre National d'Étude et de Recherche (National Centre for Study and Research)

=== Central African Republic ===
- Force spéciale de défense des institutions républicaines (FORSIDIR) (The Presidential Lifeguard)
- Unité de sécurité présidentielle (USP) (Presidential Security Organisation – acted as the main secret organisation before and after FORSIDIR)
- Office central de répression du banditisme (OCRB) (Central Office of Banditry Repression)

=== Chad ===
- Direction de la Documentation et de la Sécurité (DDS) (Directorate of Documentation and Security)

=== Chile ===
- Dirección de Inteligencia Nacional (DINA) (National Intelligence Directorate), active during the regime of Augusto Pinochet
- Central Nacional de Informaciones (CNI) (National Information Centre), active during the regime of Augusto Pinochet

=== China ===
- Jinyiwei (Ming Dynasty) (1368–1661)
- Eastern Depot (Ming Dynasty) (1420-1644)
- Western Depot (Ming Dynasty) (1477-1482, 1508-1510)
- Internal Depot (Ming Dynasty) (1508-1510)
- Bureau of Investigation and Statistics (Republic of China) (1938–1946)

=== Colombia ===
- Administrative Department of Security Departamento Administrativo de Seguridad (DAS) (1960–2011)

=== Congo, People's Republic of ===
- General Directorate for State Security (French: Direction Générale de la Sécurité de l'État)

=== Croatia, Independent State of ===
- Ravnateljstvo za javni red i sigurnost (RAVSIGUR) (Directorate for Public Order and Security) / Glavno ravnateljstvo za javni red i sigurnost (GRAVSIGUR) (General Directorate for Public Order and Security)
- Ustaška nadzorna služba (UNS) (Ustaše Surveillance Service)

=== Cuba ===
- Bureau for the Repression of Communist Activities (Batista government)

=== Czechoslovakia ===
- Státní bezpečnost / Štátna bezpečnosť (StB / ŠtB) (State Security), active in the Czechoslovak Socialist Republic

=== Dominican Republic ===
- Servicio Inteligencia Militar (SIM) – Military Intelligence Service under Rafael Trujillo

=== Egypt ===
- State Security Investigations Service (Mabahith Amn al-Dawla al-'Ulya)

=== Finland ===
- Etsivä keskuspoliisi (EK) (1919–1937) (transl. "Detecting central police")
- Valtiollinen poliisi (Valpo) (1937–1949) (transl. "State police")

=== Germany ===
- Preußische Geheimpolizei (Prussian Secret Police) – active in the Kingdom of Prussia, the German Confederation, the North German Confederation, the German Empire and the Weimar Republic; merged in the Gestapo
- Geheime Staatspolizei (Gestapo) (Secret State Police) – active in Nazi Germany
- Geheime Feldpolizei (Secret Field Police) – The Wehrmacht's version of the Gestapo
- SS-Sicherheitsdienst (SS Security Service) – The intelligence agency of the Nazi Party and the SS
- Ministerium für Staatssicherheit (MfS or Stasi) (Ministry for State Security) – active in the German Democratic Republic during the Cold War

=== Greece ===
- Organization for the Protection of the People's Struggle (OPLA)
  - National Civil Guard
  - People's Civil Guard
- Greek Military Police, active as a secret police force during the Greek military junta

=== Guatemala ===
- Cuerpo de Detectives (Detectives Corp)
- Policía Judicial (Judicial Police)
- Policía Militar Ambulate (PMA) (Mobile Military Police)
- Guardia de Hacienda (Palace Guard)
- Centro de Servicios Especiales de la Presidencia (Centre for Special Presidential Services)

=== Haiti ===
- Service d'Information (SD) (Information Service)
- Milice de Volontaires de la Sécurité Nationale (MVSN) (Militia of National Security Volunteers, better known as the Tonton Macoutes), active during the Duvalier dynasty

=== Honduras ===
- Departamento Nacional de Investigaciones (DNI) (National Investigation Department)

=== Hong Kong ===
- Special Branch (British Hong Kong) (1934-1995)

=== Hungary ===
- Államvédelmi Osztály (ÁVO) (State Protection Department)
- Államvédelmi Hatóság (ÁVH) (State Protection Authority)

=== Indonesia ===
- Komando Pemulihan Keamanan dan Ketertiban (Kopkamtib) (Security and Order Restoration Command), active during the regime of Suharto

=== Iran ===
- Sazeman-i Ettelaat va Amniyat-i Keshvar (SAVAK) (National Organization for Intelligence and Security), active in the Imperial State of Iran

=== Iraq ===
- Shurta (The Shurṭa), secret police of the Abbasid caliphs active during the Abbasid Empire
- Jihaz Al-Mukhabarat Al-A'ma (Mukhabarat) (Iraqi Intelligence Service), active in Ba'athist Iraq

=== Ireland ===
- Criminal Investigation Department (CID)

=== Italy ===
- Organizzazione di Vigilanza Repressione dell'Antifascismo (OVRA) (Organization for Vigilance and Repression of Anti-Fascism), active in Fascist Italy and the Italian Social Republic under the rule of Benito Mussolini

=== Japan ===
- Tokubetsu Kōtō Keisatsu (Tokkō) (Special Higher Police)
- Kempeitai (Military Police Corps), secret military police of the Imperial Army, later the army and navy
- Tokubetsu Keisatsutai (Tokkeitai) (Special Police Corps), secret military police of the Imperial Navy, duties later assumed by the Kenpeitai

=== Mexico ===
- Dirección Federal de Seguridad (DFS) (Federal Security Directorate)
- División de Investigaciones para la Prevención de la Delincuencia (DIPD) (Investigation Division for the Prevention of Delinquency)

=== Mongolia ===
- Dotood Yam (Ministry of Internal Affairs), active in the Mongolian People's Republic

=== Mozambique ===
- National Service of Popular Security (SNASP)

=== Nicaragua ===
- Dirección General de Seguridad del Estado (DGSE) (Directorate-General of State Security)
- Ministerio de Seguridad Interior (MSI) (Ministry of Internal Security)

=== Nigeria ===
- Nigerian Security Organization (NSO)

=== Ottoman Empire ===
- Teşkilât-ı Mahsusa (Special Organization)

=== Paraguay ===
- Pyraguës (Between 1814 and 1840, nicknamed Hairy Feet by civilians)
- División Técnica de Represión del Comunismo (Technical Division for the Repression of Communism), active during the El Stronato period, the single-party military dictatorship of Alfredo Stroessner
- Departamento de Investigaciones de la Policía (DIPC) (Police Investigations Department), active during the El Stronato period, the single-party military dictatorship of Alfredo Stroessner

=== Peru ===
- Seguridad del Estado (State Security)

=== Philippines ===
- Metrocom Intelligence and Security Group, active during the rule of Ferdinand Marcos
- National Intelligence and Security Authority or NISA, active during the rule of Ferdinand Marcos. Headed by Marcos' trusted military man, General Fabian Ver, who was also the commander of presidential security and in 1981, was appointed as chief of staff of the Armed Forces of the Philippines.

=== Poland ===
- Urząd Bezpieczeństwa Publicznego (UBP) (1945–1954) – Office of Public Safety, active in the Polish People's Republic
- Służba Bezpieczeństwa (SB) (1956–1989) – Security Service of the Ministry of Internal Affairs), active in the Polish People's Republic

=== Portugal ===
- Polícia Preventiva (Preventive Police): 1918–1919, active in the First Portuguese Republic
- Polícia de Segurança do Estado (State Security Police): 1919, active in the First Portuguese Republic
- Polícia de Defesa Social (Social Defense Police): 1919–1926, active in the First Portuguese Republic
- Polícia de Informações (Informations Police): 1926–1931, active during the Ditadura Nacional period
- Polícia de Vigilância Política e Social (Political and Social Surveillance Police): 1933, active during the Ditadura Nacional period
- Polícia de Vigilância e de Defesa do Estado (State Defence and Surveillance Police): 1933–1945, active during the Estado Novo regime under the rule of António de Oliveira Salazar
- Polícia Internacional e de Defesa do Estado – PIDE (International and State Defence Police): 1945–1968, active during the Estado Novo regime under the rule of António de Oliveira Salazar
- Direcção-Geral de Segurança (Directorate-General of Security): 1968–1974, active during the Estado Novo regime under the rule of Marcelo Caetano

=== Republic of China (Taiwan) ===
- Taiwan Garrison Command

=== Roman Empire ===
- Agentes in rebus
- Frumentarii
- Cohors Praetoria (SPQR) [The Praetorian Guard] – An ancient Roman institution in charge of the Roman emperor's safety.

=== Romania ===
- Direcția Poliției și Siguranței Generale (Siguranța) [The Directorate of Police and General Safety], active in the Kingdom of Romania
- Departamentul Securităţii statului (Securitatea) [The Department of State Security], active in Bolshevik Romania

=== Russian monarchy ===
- Oprichniki (1565–1573), under Ivan the Terrible
- Third Section of His Imperial Majesty's Own Chancellery (1825–1880), under Nicholas I of Russia
- Separate Corps of Gendarmes (1836–1917)
- Okhrana (Okhrannoye otdeleniye = The Guard Department) [1866–1917]

=== Rwanda ===
- Service Central de Renseignements (SCR) [Central Information Service]

=== El Salvador ===
- Organización Democrática Nacionalista (ORDEN) [Nationalist Democratic Organization]
- Frente Democrático Nacionalista (FDN) [Nationalist Democratic Front]

=== Singapore ===
- Special Branch

=== Somalia ===
- National Security Service, active in the Somali Democratic Republic
- Hangash (Military Intelligence Unit), active in the Somali Democratic Republic
- Victory Pioneers (Neighbourhood watch), active in the Somali Democratic Republic
- Dhabar Jabinta (Division of military police), active in the Somali Democratic Republic
- Red Berets (Presidential bodyguards), active in the Somali Democratic Republic

=== South Africa ===
- Republican Intelligence (RI), active during the Apartheid era
- Bureau of State Security (BOSS), active during the Apartheid era

=== Soviet Union ===
- Soviet secret police
- All-Russian Extraordinary Commission (Cheka, 1917–22)
- State Political Directorate (GPU, 1922–23)
- Joint State Political Directorate (OGPU, 1923–34)
- People's Commissariat for Internal Affairs (NKVD 1934–46)
- Main Directorate of State Security (GUGB 1934–41)
- People's Commissariat for State Security (NKGB, Feb Jul-1941/1943–46)
- Ministry for State Security (MGB, 1946–53)
- Committee for State Security (KGB, 1954–91)

=== Spain ===
- Servicio de Información Militar (Military Information Service), active in the Second Spanish Republic during the Spanish Civil War
- Brigada Político-Social (BPS) (Political-Social Brigade) / Brigada de Investigación Social (BIS) (Social Investigation Brigade), active in Francoist Spain
- Servicio Central de Documentación (SECED) (Central Documentation Service)
- Servicio de Inteligencia de la Guardia Civil (Intelligence Service of the Civil Guard)

=== Syria ===
National Security Bureau

- Air Force Intelligence Directorate
- General Intelligence Directorate
- Political Security Directorate
- Military Intelligence Directorate

=== Uganda ===
- Public Safety Unit
- State Research Bureau

=== United States ===
- Mississippi State Sovereignty Commission, largely confined to the State of Mississippi to resist desegregation.
- Alabama State Sovereignty Commission, largely confined to the State of Alabama to resist desegregation.
- Louisiana State Sovereignty Commission, largely confined to the State of Louisiana to resist desegregation.
- Florida Legislative Investigation Committee, largely confined to the State of Florida to resist desegregation.
- COINTELPRO, a series of illegal projects by the Federal Bureau of Investigation.
- CONUS Intel, an illegal surveillance project by the U.S. military that led to a political scandal.
- LAPD Red Squad, a unit of the Los Angeles Police Department that primarily targeted leftist organizations.

=== Uruguay ===
- Organismo Coordinador de Actividades Anti-Subversivas (Anti-Subversive Activities Co-ordination Organization)

=== Venezuela ===
- Dirección de Seguridad Nacional (DSN, Directory of National Security)

=== South Vietnam ===
- Social and Political Research Service (Sở Nghiên Cứu Xã Hội Chính Trị) (during the regime of Ngô Đình Diệm)

=== Yugoslavia ===
- Department for People's Protection (OZNA, 1944–1946), active in Democratic Federal Yugoslavia
- State Security Administration (UDBA, 1946–1991), active in the Socialist Federal Republic of Yugoslavia
- Counterintelligence Service (KOS, 1946–1991)
- State Security Service (SDB, 1991–2002), active in the Federal Republic of Yugoslavia
- Security Administration (1992–2002)

=== Zaire ===
- Centre Nationale de Documentation (CND) (National Documentation Center) – 1969-early 1980s
- Agence Nationale de Documentation (AND) (National Documentation Agency) – Early 1980s – August 1990
- Service National d'Intelligence et de Protection (SNIP) (National Service for Intelligence and Protection) (August 1990 – May 1997)

== See also ==
- List of fictional secret police and intelligence organizations
- List of defunct intelligence agencies
- List of secret police organizations
- Police
- Secret police
