= Isaaq genocide =

1987–1989 genocide of Isaaq in northern Somalia

- Part of Somaliland War of Independence
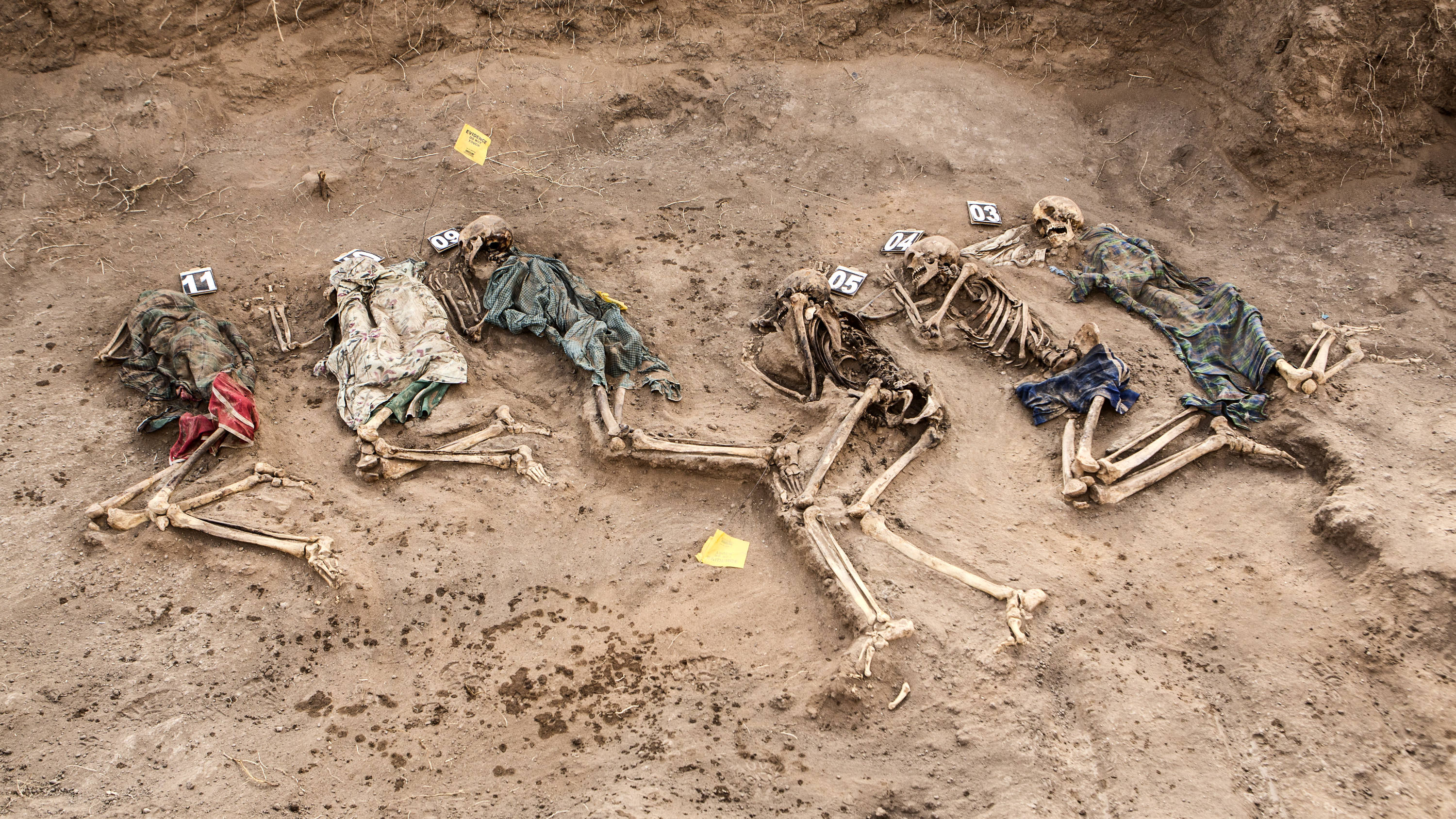
- Exhumed skeletal remains of victims of the Isaaq genocide
- Location: Somali Democratic Republic
- Date: 1987–1989
- Target: Isaaq population
- Attack type: Genocide, genocidal massacre, state terrorism, mass murder, forced disappearance, crimes against humanity, war crime, democide
- Deaths: 50,000–200,000
- Perpetrator: Somali Democratic Republic

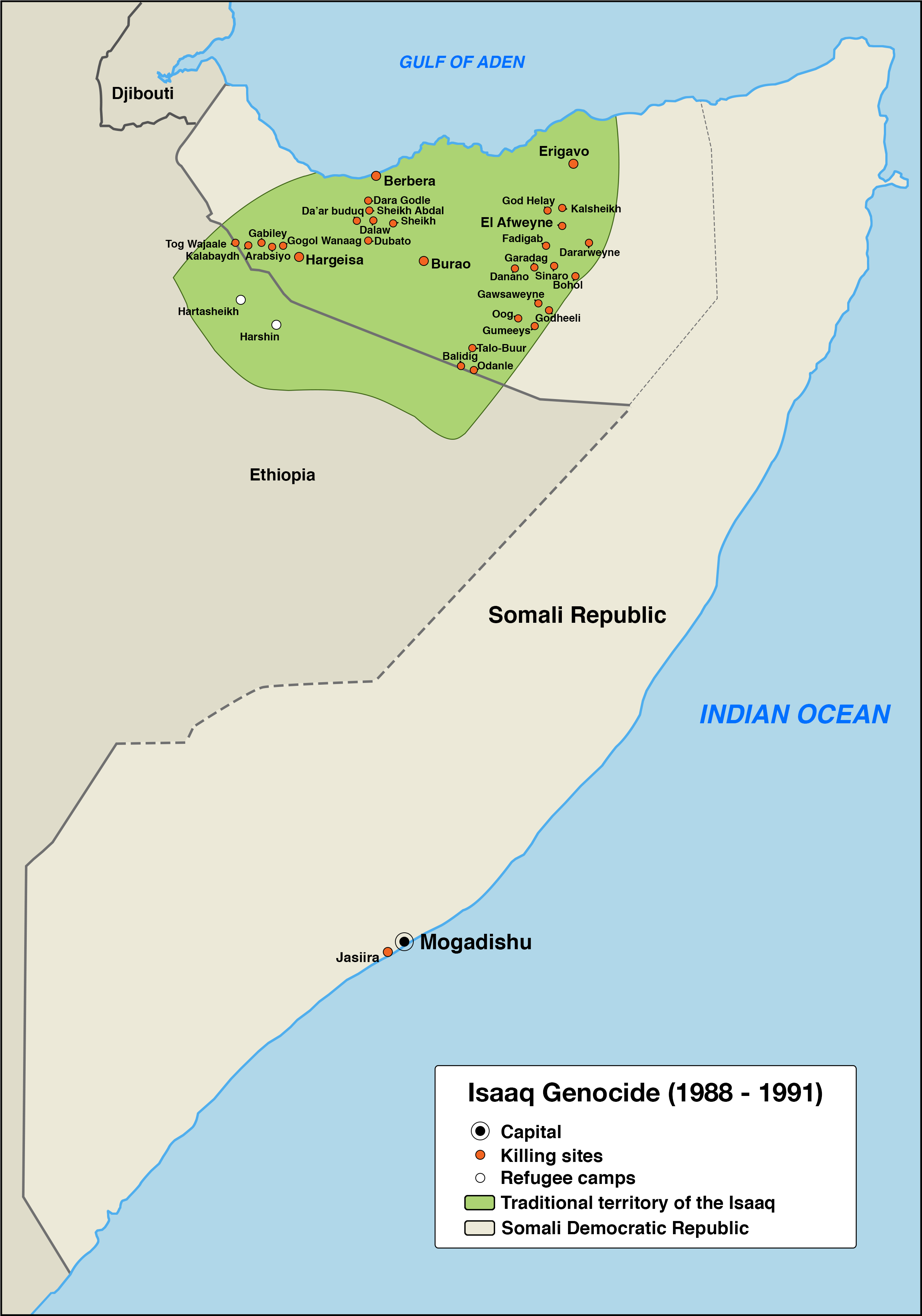
Map of the sites related to the Isaaq genocide

The Isaaq genocide (Note: Somali: Xasuuqii beesha Isaaq; Arabic: الإبادة الجماعية لقبيلة إسحاق) also known as the Hargeisa Holocaust, was the systematic, state-sponsored genocide of Isaaq civilians between 1987 and 1989, during the Somaliland War of Independence. It was carried out under the dictatorship of Siad Barre, president of the Somali Democratic Republic. The number of civilian deaths is estimated to be between 50,000 and 200,000.

The genocide, which escalated after the Somali National Movement (SNM)'s 1988 Northern Somalia offensive, was marked by intense fighting that included SNM attacks on Ogaden refugee camps. These refugees, who had arrived after the 1977 Ogaden War, were viewed by the SNM as a paramilitary force used by the state to colonize Isaaq land. The genocide included the levelling and complete destruction of the largest and second largest cities in Somaliland, Hargeisa (which was 90 percent destroyed) and Burao (70 percent destroyed), respectively. In addition, up to 500,000 Somalilanders, primarily of the Isaaq clan, fled across the border as refugees to Hart Sheik, Ethiopia, in what was described as "one of the fastest and largest forced movements of people recorded in Africa," which resulted in the creation of the world's then-largest refugee camp. An additional 400,000 Somalilanders were internally displaced. The scale of destruction led to Hargeisa becoming known as the 'Dresden of Africa'. The killings happened during the Somali Civil War and have been referred to as a "forgotten genocide".

In the countryside, the persecution of Isaaq included the creation of a mechanised section of the Somali Armed Forces dubbed as Dabar Goynta Isaaqa (lit. 'The Isaaq Exterminators') consisting entirely of non-Isaaqs (mainly Ogaden); this unit conducted a "systematic pattern of attacks against unarmed, civilian villages, watering points and grazing areas of Somaliland, killing many of their residents and forcing survivors to flee for safety to remote areas". This resulted in entire villages being depopulated and towns getting plundered. Rape was also used as a weapon against Isaaqs. Rakiya Omaar of Human Rights Watch states that this unit, along with other branches of the military, were responsible for terrorising Isaaq nomads in the countryside. Dabar Goynta Isaaqa would later turn into a system of governance where local officials would put the most hard-line policies into effect against the local Isaaq population. The Somali government also planted one million land mines within Isaaq territory.

In 2001, the United Nations commissioned an investigation on past human rights violations in Somalia, specifically to find out if "crimes of international jurisdiction (i.e. war crimes, crimes against humanity or genocide) had been perpetrated during the country's civil war". The investigation was commissioned jointly by the United Nations Coordination Unit (UNCU) and the Office of the United Nations High Commissioner for Human Rights. The investigation concluded with a report confirming the crime of genocide to have taken place against the Isaaqs in Somalia. United Nations investigator Chris Mburu stated:

Based on the totality of evidence collected in Somaliland and elsewhere both during and after his mission, the consultant firmly believes that the crime of genocide was conceived, planned and perpetrated by the Somali Government against the Isaaq people of northern Somalia between 1987 and 1989.

== Background ==
=== Postcolonial era ===
The first Somali state to be granted its independence from colonial powers was Somaliland, a former British protectorate that gained independence on 26 June 1960. The rest of what came to be known as Somali Republic was under Italian rule under the title Trust Territory of Somaliland (also known as Somalia Italiana). Shortly after Somaliland gained independence, it was to form a hasty union with its southern neighbour to create the Somali Republic. Henceforth British Somaliland was referred to as the northern (or north-western) region of the Somali Republic, whilst the former Italian colonial state was referred to as the south.

Within British Somaliland the Isaaq constituted the majority group within the protectorate with Dir and Harti groups also having sizeable populations to the west and east of Isaaq respectively.

The union of the two states proved problematic early on when in a referendum held on 20 June 1961 to approve the provisional constitution that would govern the two ex-colonial territories was rejected by half of the population in the State of Somaliland (the north-west of nascent Somali Republic), the major cities of the former British protectorate voted against the ratification of the constitution – Hargeisa (72%), Berbera (69%), Lasanod (67), Burao (65), (Erigavo (69%), Borama (87%), – all returned negative votes. This was in contrast to the south (ex-Italian colony) which returned a strong support for the constitution (and four times the expected vote numbers in the south, indicating electoral fraud, an example of this is a small southern village called Wanla Weyn registered a yes vote higher than the 100,000 votes counted in all of the north), this was major signal of discontent coming from the north only a year after forming the union. Another example of the simmering discontent in the north was a coup attempt by northern officers that was thwarted in 1961.

=== Social, political and economic marginalisation ===
The northern dissatisfaction with the constitution and terms of unification was a subject that the successive civilian governments continued to ignore. The northerners, especially the majority Isaaq and Harti, believed that the unified state would be divided federally (north and south) and that they would receive a fair share of representation post-unification. The south proceeded to dominate all of the important posts of the new state, this included the President, Prime Minister, Minister of Defence, Minister of Interior and Minister of Foreign Affairs posts all given to politicians hailing from the south. The political marginalisation that majority of northerners felt was further exacerbated by economic deprivation, the north received just under 7 percent of nationally disbursed development assistance by the late 1970s, as more than 95% of all development projects and scholarships were distributed in the south. One example is cited by Hassan Megag Samater, the former director in charge of the Ministry of Education in Somaliland, he states that he had handed his post in 1966 with the northern region having "several hundred schools at all levels, from elementary schools to college. By the last year of the Barre regime, there was not a single school functioning at full strength."

=== 1969 coup ===
In October 1969, the military seized power in a coup following the assassination of President Abdirashid Ali Shermarke and the ensuing political parliamentary debate on succession, which ended in a deadlock. The army banned political parties, suspended the constitution and closed the National Assembly, General Siad Barre was chosen as the head of state and presided over the Supreme Revolutionary Council. The new regime outlawed political dissent and employed a heavy handed approach in managing the state. The United Nations Development Programme stated that "the 21-year regime of Siyad Barre had one of the worst human rights records in Africa." The new regime became a client state of the Soviet Union and on the first anniversary of the coup officially adopted scientific socialism as its core ideology.

== Prelude ==
=== Ethio-Somali War ===
Successive Somali governments had continually supported the cause of Somali irredentism and the concept of 'Greater Somalia', a powerful sentiment many Somalis carried, as a core goal of the state. This particularly had strong support from the Isaaq clan, who notably sent many volunteers, especially in 1976, as they joined WSLF guerrilla insurgencies and sent many volunteers a year before the war took place. Another factor behind the strong support from the Isaaq was that the border that was drawn between Ethiopia and Somalia cut off important grazing grounds for Isaaq tribesmen. Barre, along with the Supreme Revolutionary Council, to entrench their rule and in an attempt to regain the Somali Region of Ethiopia, launched a war against Ethiopia in 1977; this war was referred to in Somalia as 'The War for Western Somalia'. The Soviet Union, which at the time was allied to both Somalia and Ethiopia turned against Barre, and (with their allies) provided enough support to the Ethiopian army to defeat the Somali forces and force a withdrawal from the Somali region of Ethiopia.

=== Displacement of Isaaq and arming of refugees ===
All of Somalia felt the impact of the Ogaden War defeat; however, the northern region (where Isaaqs live) experienced the majority of the physical and human destruction due to its geographical proximity to the fighting. Somalia's defeat in the Ethio-Somali War caused an influx of Ethiopian refugees (mostly ethnic Somalis and some Oromo) across the border to Somalia. By 1979, official figures reported 1.3 million refugees in Somalia, more than half of them were settled in Isaaq lands in the north. This has caused a great deal of burden on both the local Isaaqs and state apparatus, especially coming off a costly war with Ethiopia, Somali studies scholar I. M. Lewis noted that "the stark fact remained that the economy of the country simply did not possess the resources to absorb so many uprooted people."

The presence of such a large number of refugees, especially when Somalia's total population at the time was 4.1 million (UN estimates) meant that virtually one out of every four people in Somalia was a refugee. The Barre regime exploited the presence of such a large number of refugees as means of seeking foreign aid, as well as a vehicle to displacing those deemed hostile to the state, notably the Isaaqs, Human Rights Watch noted that:

"Northerners [Isaaqs] were dismissed from and not allowed to work in government offices dealing with refugee affairs, so that they would not discover the truth about the government's policies. Instead, refugees registered with UNHCR were given jobs in the offices dealing with refugee matters."

As the state became increasingly reliant on international aid, aid resources allocated for the refugees caused further resentment from the local Isaaq residents, especially as they felt no effort was made on the government's part to compensate them for bearing the burden of the war. Furthermore, Barre heavily favoured the Ogaden refugees, who belonged to the same clan (Darod) as him. Due to these ties, the Ogaden refugees enjoyed preferential access to "social services, business licenses and even government posts." As expressed animosity and discontent in the north grew, Barre armed the Ogaden refugees, and in doing so created an irregular army operating inside Isaaq territories. The regime's use of armed refugees against local Isaaq populations in the north is also referenced in an Africa Watch report:

"[M]any Ogadeni refugees were recruited into the WSLF. The WSLF was ostensibly being trained to fight Ethiopia to regain the Ogaden [Western Somalia], but, in fact, terrorized the Isaak [Isaaq] civilian population living in the border region, which came to fear them more than the Ethiopian army. Killings, rape and looting became common."

Barre was essentially ensuring the loyalty of the Ogaden refugees through continued preferential treatment and protection at the expense of the local Isaaq who were not only bypassed for economic, social and political advancement but also forcefully suppressed by both the Somali Armed Forces and the Ogaden refugee militias.

The settlement of Ogaden refugees in Isaaq territory, and the arming of these groups (which effectively created a foreign army in the north), further antagonised local Isaaq population. The armed Ogaden refugees, together with members of the Marehan and Dhulbahanta soldiers (who were provoked and encouraged by the Barre regime) started a campaign of terror against the local Isaaqs as they raped women, murdered unarmed civilians, and prevented families from conducting proper burials. Barre ignored Isaaq complaints throughout the 1980s, this, along with Barre's repression of criticism or discussions of the widespread atrocities in the north had the effect of turning the long-standing Isaaq disaffection into open opposition.

==== Creation of refugee Ogaden militia ====
The government started a program of creating paramilitary groups among the Ogaden refugees as well as conscripting them into the national army, it also encouraged the creation of armed militia groups among members of the Darod (the clan of Siad Barre). The Somali Army managed the training of both groups, and costs incurred, including any expenditure for their arms and equipment, radio communications, and fuel, came from the army's budget.

One of the militias formed by the Ogaden refugees was the WSLF, officially created to fight Ethiopia and "reclaim ethnic Somali territory" in Ethiopia but it was used primarily against local Isaaq civilians and nomads. A Human Rights Watch's Africa Watch report states, "The WSLF was ostensibly being trained to fight Ethiopia to regain the Ogaden, but, in fact, terrorized the Isaak civilian population living in the border region, which came to fear them more than the Ethiopian army. Killing, rape, and looting became common."

As for the looting, the Ogaden refugees from Ethiopia ransacked homes that were vacated by Isaaq civilians out of clan hatred. The Isaaqs' entrepreneurial disposition was also a factor in the large-scale looting, which the Ogadenis saw as 'undeserved':

In northern Somalia, the Isaaq clans confronted a massive influx of Ogadeni refugees from eastern Ethiopia whom Siyad encouraged to loot property, attack people, and destabilize cities. An instrument of oppression, the Ogadeni and the regular Somali army were viewed as alien forces sent to oppress the Isaaq. Clan animosity intersected with class hatred as rural Ogadeni clansmen harassed Isaaq entrepreneurs with a visceral hatred, convinced that their wealth and urban commodities were undeserved. The Isaaq tell hilarious but pathetic stories about Ogadenis who stole modern household appliances from homes in Hargeisa, Borama and Burao, then retreated with their "trophies" to use them in the remote pasture lands devoid of electricity.

As the WSLF, supported by the Barre regime, continued to attack and commit atrocities against the Isaaq, a delegation was sent to meet President Barre in 1979 to request making a stop WSLF abuses. Despite promises made to the Isaaq elders, the violence against civilians and nomads by WSLF continued.

The continued abuse of WSLF and the government's indifference to the suffering of Isaaq civilians and nomads prompted many Isaaq army officers to desert the army with a view to creating their own armed movement to fight Ethiopia, one that would also intimidate the WSLF and discourage further violence against Isaaq civilians. Their new movement, supported and financed by Isaaqs, was named Afraad (the fourth unit) and became operational in 1979. The Isaaq movement of Afraad immediately came into conflict with the Ogaden clan's faction of WSLF in the form of several bloody encounters between the two groups. Afraad's objective was to push the WSLF out of their strongholds (Isaaq territory), whereas the WSLF responded by retaliating further against Isaaq civilians living in the border region.

The situation was further exacerbated by the appointment of Mohamed Hashi Gani, a cousin of President Siad Barre and fellow Marehan Darod, as the military commander of the northern regions with headquarters in Hargeisa in 1980. Gani's rule was especially harsh against Isaaq, he removed them from all key economic positions, seized their properties and placed the northern regions under emergency laws. He also ordered the transfer of Afraad away from the border region, giving the WSLF complete control of the border region, thus leaving Isaaq nomads in the area without any protection against WSLF violence.

A United Nations inspection team that visited the area in 1988 reported that the Ethiopian refugees (Ogaden) were carrying weapons supplied by the Somali Army. The UN team reported that, with the Somali Army's encouragement, the Ogadeni refugees carried out extensive looting in several northern towns.

=== Isaaq uprising ===
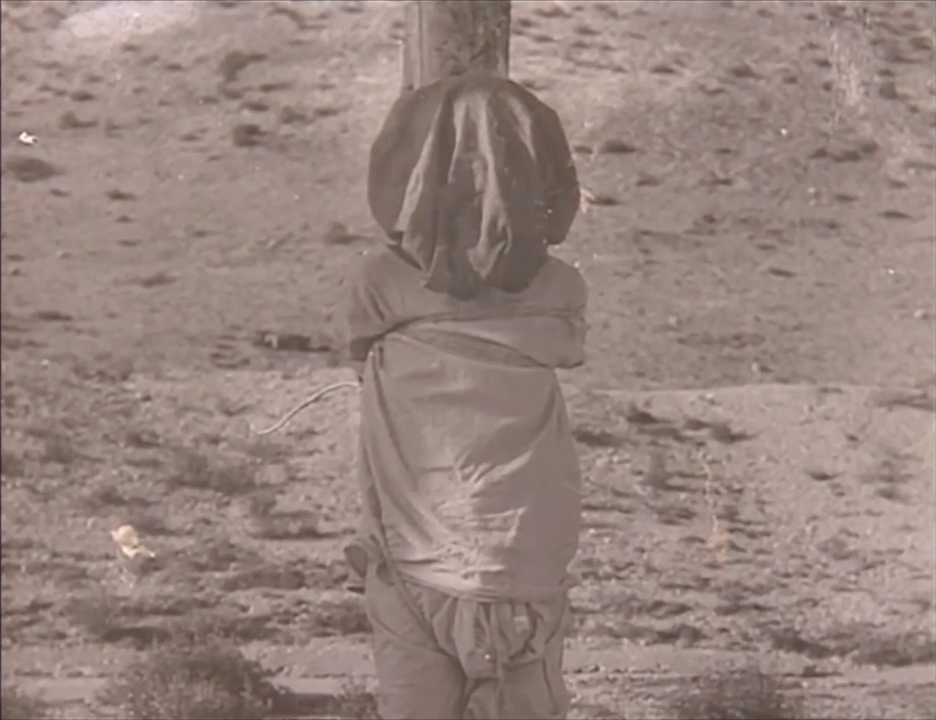
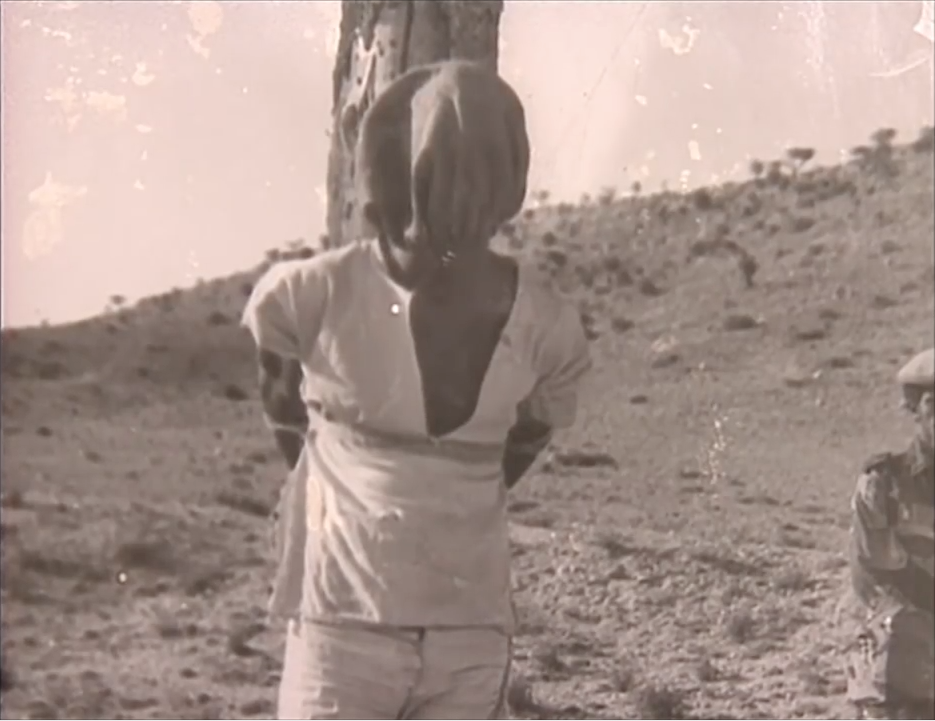
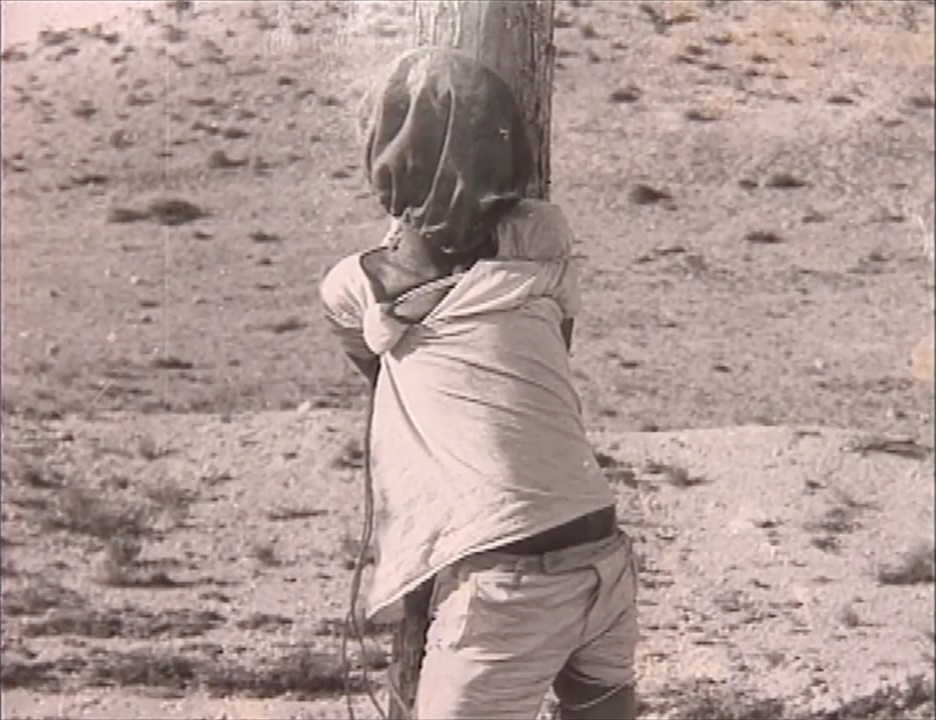
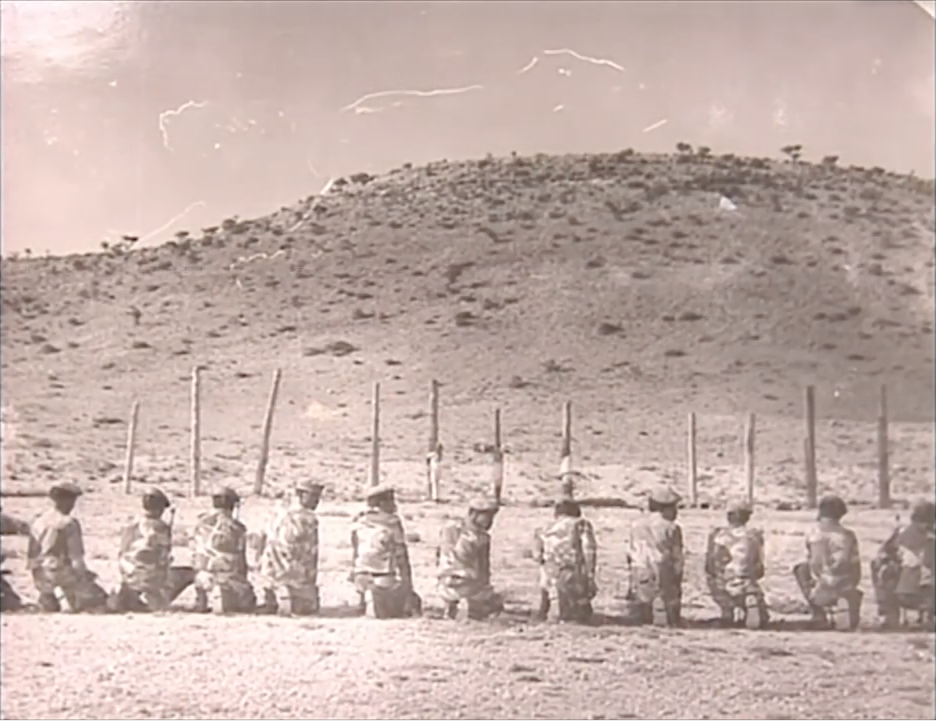
Summary executions of Hargeisa Isaaqs happened at Badhka, close to a hill in the outskirts of the city, where 25 soldiers shot blindfolded victims whose hands and feet were tied.

By early 1978 the Barre regime had full control of the Somali state's economic apparatus, including large amounts of foreign aid which were deployed "using selective redistribution to ensure loyalty to the regime". The Barre regime's oppressive policies against the Isaaq continued when in 1981, the Barre regime declared economic warfare on Somalis from the northwest and specifically the Isaaq. This was a major cause of the eventual fall of the Barre regime in 1991. It led a group of Isaaq businesspeople, students, former civil servants and former politicians who lived in the United Kingdom to found the Somali National Movement (SNM) in London in April 1981. Initially, the aim of the various groups that merged to create the SNM was not to create an armed liberation front, but rather these groups formed as a direct response to the harsh policies enacted by the Barre regime against the Isaaqs. However, the official position changed following the meeting of the newly formed SNM Congress in October 1981 to one of liberation "with the expressed aim of ridding Somalia of Barre and instituting a democratic government in Somalia that would be inclusive of and based on the clan system". Ideologically, the SNM was a Western-leaning movement and was described as "one of the most democratic movements in the Horn of Africa".

A Human Rights Watch testimony before the United States Congress' Africa Subcommittee on 14 July 1988 stated that the actions of the Barre government have "created a level of violence unprecedented in scope and duration in Somalia". The testimony of Aryeh Neier (co-founder of HRW) explains the context in which the SNM was formed:

Since 1981, with the formation of the SNM, northern Somalia has seen the worst atrocities. Serious human rights violations, including extra-judicial executions of unarmed civilians, detentions without trial, unfair trials, torture, rape, looting and extortion, have been a prominent feature of life in the towns and countryside in the northern region since 1981. To deprive the SNM of a civilian base of support in their area of operation, those living in rural areas between Hargeisa and the Ethiopian border have suffered particularly brutal treatment. A scorched earth policy that involved the burning of farms, the killing of livestock, the destruction of water-storage tanks and the deliberate poisoning of wells, has been pursued actively by the military. The principal towns have been subjected to a curfew for several years; arbitrary restrictions on the extension of the curfew have facilitated extortion by soldiers and curfew patrols. Internal travel is controlled through military checkpoints .... The existence of the SNM has provided a pretext for President Barre and his military deputies in the north to wage a war against peaceful citizens and to enable them to consolidate their control of the country by terrorizing anyone who is suspected of not being wholeheartedly pro-government. Years of sustained state violence have created a serious level of political unrest in the region.

The atmosphere of lawlessness has enabled soldiers to harass civilians for extortion. Many Somalis have reported that military and security officers only respond to inquiries by detainees' relatives with promises to secure their release in exchange for cash payments. Civilians living in Burao and Hargeisa have frequently been forbidden to hold funerals for relatives shot dead by the military and curfew patrols until they have paid a ransom. Rape of young and older women is routine. They will only be released from detention centers, even after being raped, if the family pays a ransom. No soldier or member of the security forces has ever been disciplined or prosecuted for abuses, which highlights the general lack of accountability.

By 1982 the SNM transferred their headquarters to Dire Dawa in Ethiopia, as both Somalia and Ethiopia at the time offered safe havens of operation for resistance groups against each other. From there the SNM successfully launched a guerrilla war against the Barre regime through incursions and hit and run operations on army positions within Isaaq territories before returning to Ethiopia. The SNM continued this pattern of attacks from 1982 and throughout the 1980s, at a time the Ogaden Somalis (some of whom were recruited refugees) made up the bulk of Barre's armed forces accused of committing acts of genocide against the Isaaq people of the north. It was clear then that the Barre regime had labelled the entire Isaaq population as enemy of the state. To weaken support for the SNM within the Isaaqs, the government enacted a policy of systematic use of large-scale violence against the local Isaaq population. A report by Africa Watch stated that the policy was "the outcome of a specific conception of how the war against the insurgents should be fought," with the logic being to "punish civilians for their presumed support for the SNM attacks and to discourage them from further assistance".

In addition to state-sponsored violence, other means of crushing the Isaaq uprising included the government's continuation of its policy of political repression and harsh economic measures; this included withholding international food aid donations to the Isaaq. This was especially harsh as food aid accounted for nearly half of all food consumption in Somalia in the 1980s.

=== Planning and preparation ===
==== Letter of Death ====
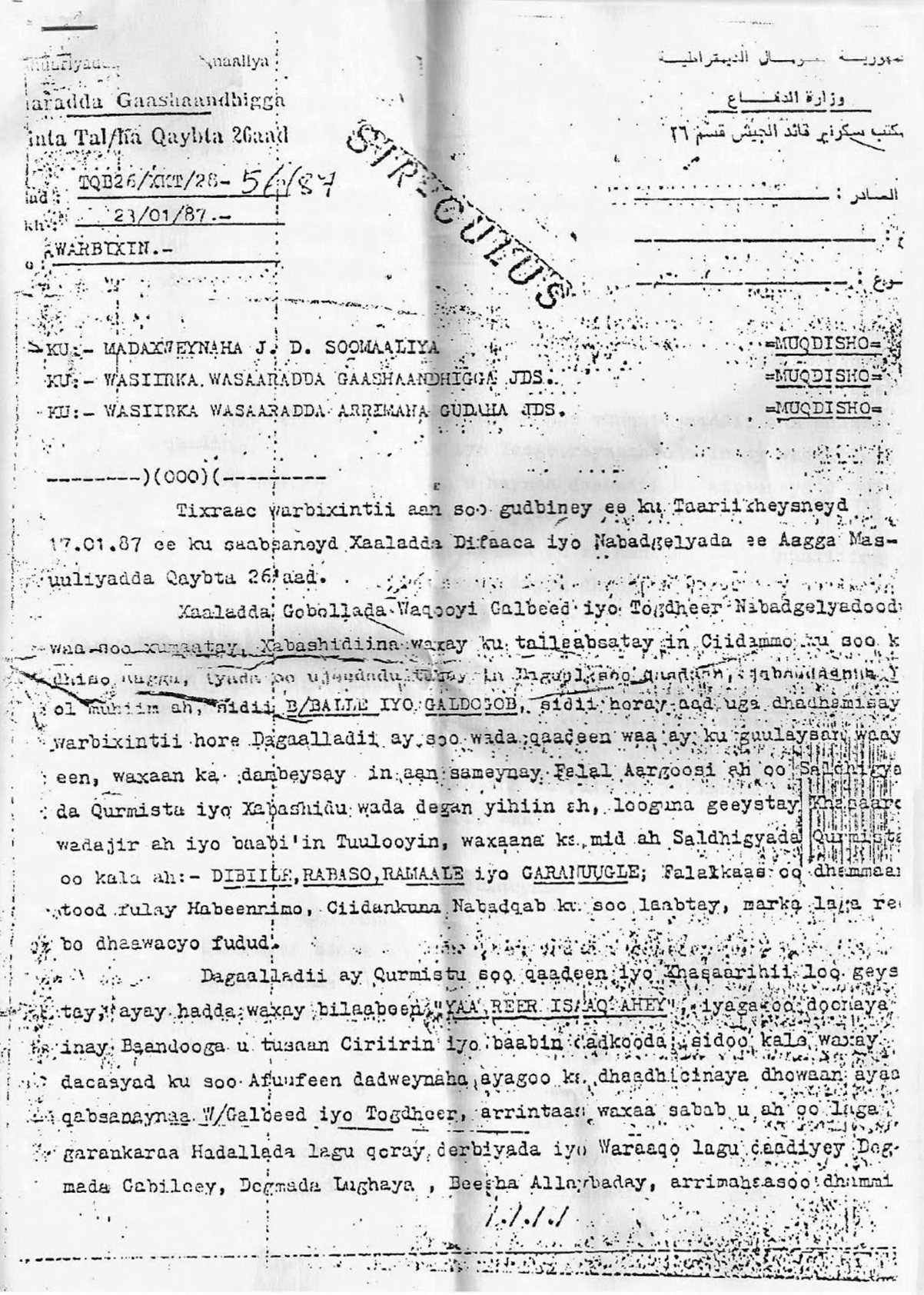
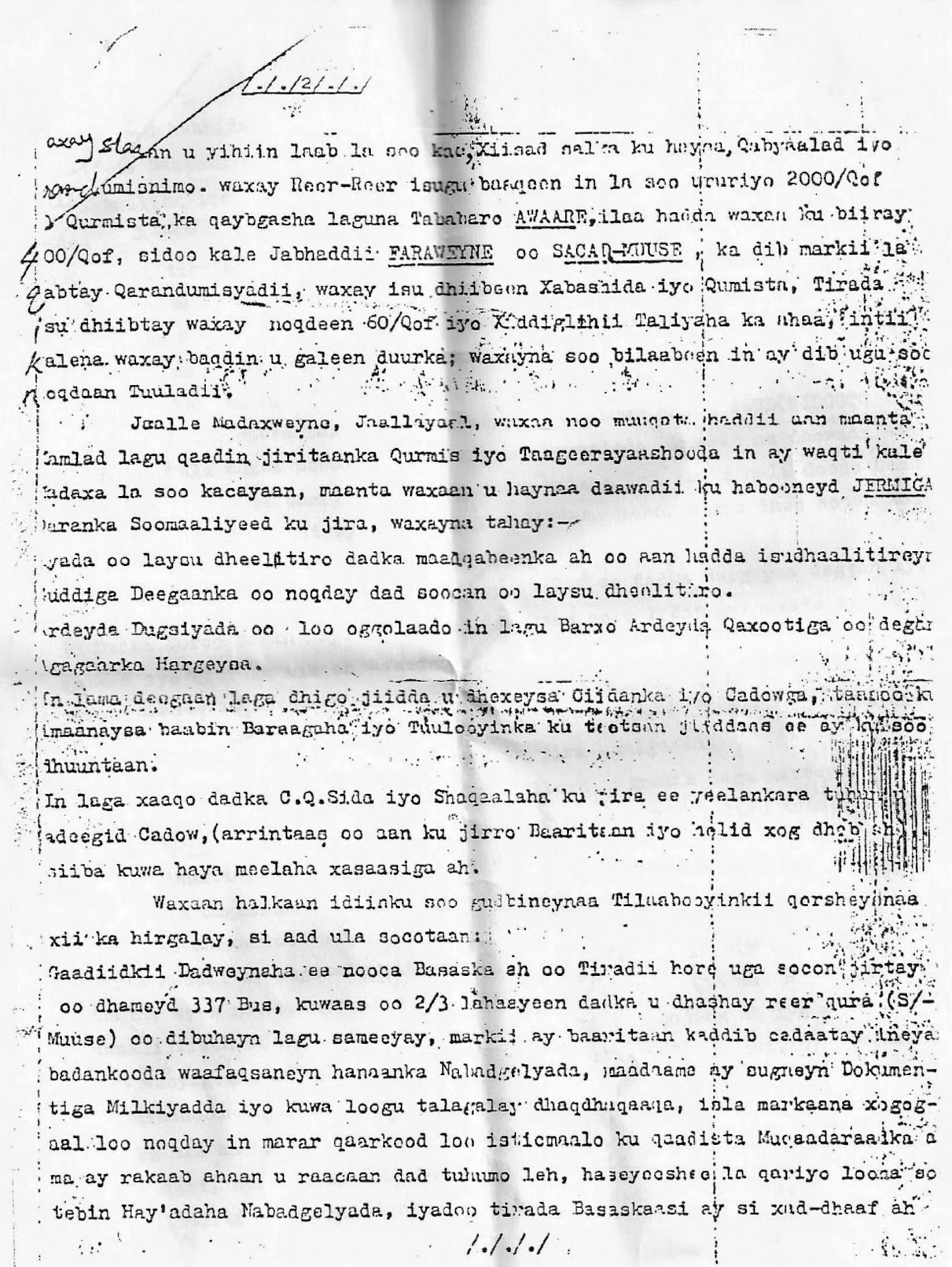
Letters of Death by General Mohammed Said Hersi Morgan, the son-in-law of dictator Siad Barre, a policy letter with the proposed "final solution" to Somalia's "Isaaq problem"

In January 1986, Barre's son-in-law and viceroy in the north General Mohammed Said Hersi Morgan, who was Barre's bodyguard before he married his daughter reportedly told Isaaq nomads at a waterhole "if you Isaaqs resist, we will destroy your towns, and you will inherit only ashes".

General Morgan (later to be known as the Butcher of Hargeisa) was also responsible for the policy letter written to his father-in-law during his time as the military governor of the north, this letter came to be known as 'The Letter of Death', in which he "proposed the foundations for a scorched-earth policy to get rid of 'anti-Somali germs'".

The policy letter (also known as the Morgan Report) was officially a top secret report to the president on "implemented and recommended measures" for a "final solution" to Somalia's "Isaaq problem". Morgan writes that the Isaaq people must be "subjected to a campaign of obliteration" in order to prevent the Isaaq from "rais[ing] their heads again". He continued: "Today, we possess the right remedy for the virus in the [body of the] Somali State." Some of the "remedies" he discussed included: "Balancing the well-to-do to eliminate the concentration of wealth [in the hands of Isaaq]." In addition, he called for "the reconstruction of the Local Council [in Isaaq settlements] in such a way as to balance its present membership which is exclusively from a particular people [the Isaaq]; as well as the dilution of the school population with an infusion of [Ogaden] children from the Refugee Camps in the vicinity of Hargeisa".

More extreme recommendations included: "Rendering uninhabitable the territory between the army and the enemy, which can be done by destroying the water tanks and the villages lying across the territory used by them for infiltration"; and "removing from the membership of the armed forces and civil service all those who are open to suspicion of aiding the enemy – especially those holding sensitive posts".

In discussing the unusually frank tone of the report, Hassan Abdi Madar states:

"The report is addressed to the President of the SDR, the Minister of Defence, and Minister of Interior. The latter, Major-General Ahmed Suleiman Abdalla, is also a son-in-law of the President, and Third Deputy Prime Minister. Since President Barre is also the Minister of Defence -- the previous holder of that portfolio, General Mohammad Ali Samatar, having been promoted Prime Minister on January 30, 1987 -- the report is seemingly confined to family members. This would explain its extreme frankness in specifying certain clans as targets for implemented and recommended punitive action."

Other aims of the policy included arming other clans in the region and encouraging them to fight the dominant Isaaq:

"Since it has become evident that the Isaaq were, by act and intent, with the SNM; and since we could not see them giving up the line they have pursued so deceptively for some time; and to forestall them; we arranged for the other inhabitants of the North continuous meetings and a mobilization campaign designed to rouse them to action and to raise their level of awareness. This was intended to strengthen their unity and to surround Somali unity with a defensive wall. Among those inhabitants are: the Awdal people, the various sections of Western Somalis [including Ogaden refugees], the Las Qorey people, and the Daami people, etc. There is no doubt that the unity of these people will restore the balance of the scales which are now tipped in favour of the Isaaq. If they attack their tasks energetically, their unity will also undoubtedly humble those who arrogantly maintain that they own the North when the reality is otherwise."

=== Extrajudicial executions ===
Victims of extrajudicial execution by government soldiers left in a Hargeisa street, June 1988, Amnesty International

The system of indiscriminate killings employed by the government following SNM offensives had a galvanising effect on opposition to the government among both Isaaq nomads and city-dwellers. The military was operating under the assumption that if the SNM was active in a particular area, residents must be supporters of the rebels. According to Human Rights Watch's Africa Watch, hundreds of Isaaqs have been executed and subjected to other reprisals based on such suspicions.

These killings started after the SNM escalated its incursions into the Isaaq majority cities in the north. On every encounter between the SNM and government forces, "the army would conduct a sweep of the area where the incident occurred. Massacres followed, as did the killing of livestock, the use of landmines to blow up reservoirs, the burning of huts, arrests and detentions. The entire population in the area was regarded as 'the enemy'."

The following are a selection of the numerous episodes of extrajudicial executions of Isaaq civilians collected by Human Rights Watch's Africa Watch:

Select extrajudicial killings
No.	Location	Number of victims	Date	Details
1	Gogol Wanaag (near Arabsiyo)	6	15 October 1984	A farmer's wife was arrested in Gogol Wanaag, accused of sheltering an SNM fighter. In addition to arresting several others, six Isaaq men were executed on the spot, including two elderly brothers, their two sons, and the son-in-law of one of the elderly men who was visiting from abroad. Their huts were burned and their animals killed. They were all accused of assisting the farmer's wife to shelter the SNM fighter. The sixth man was charged with being a member of the SNM and accompanying the SNM fighter who escaped. The villagers were not allowed to bury the dead men for five days.
2	Boqol Jirreh (a section of Hargeisa neighbouring a military compound)	26	17 November 1984	A mobile military court sentenced 26 Isaaqs to death. The group was split into 9 civilians and 17 SNM fighters, and many of the victims were nomads. Their property and assets were also seized. A group of Hargeisa elders was also seized to witness the 'proceedings' of the court, so they would 'talk sense' to the residents of Hargeisa.
3	Burao	43	December 1984	Many of the 43 victims had been detained in the city's central prison for some time on different charges. In December, as the SNM's presence in the mountains around Sheikh became known to the government, all charges against the 43 Isaaq men were dropped, and they were all accused of association with the SNM. They were 'tried' before a Mobile Military Court and executed the same afternoon. Originally 45 Isaaq men were due to be executed; at the last minute two wealthy men were spared due to the size of the loans they owed the banks.
4	Gabiley and Tog Wajaale	25	14 March 1988	A Mobile Military Court sentenced 25 Isaaq men to death; they were executed the same day. They were shot as a reprisal when a major military offensive against the SNM in the vicinity failed; some of the victims were very old men.

== Genocide ==
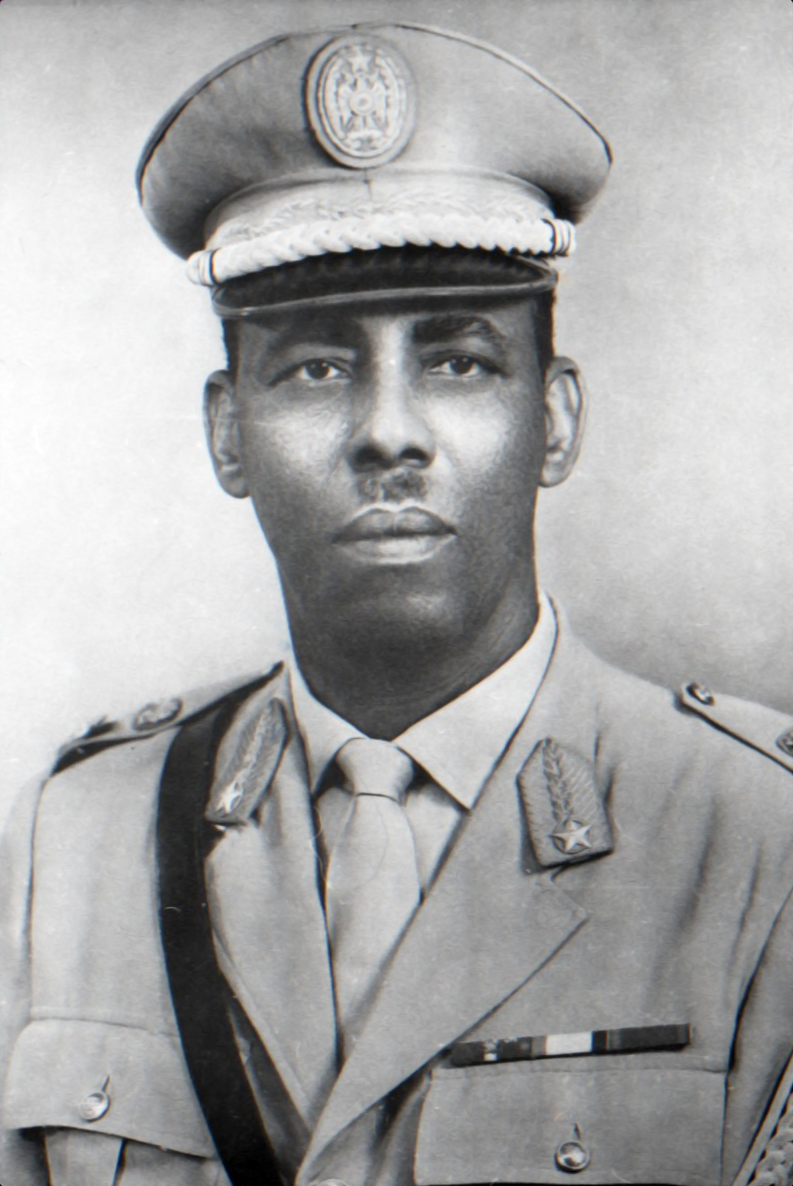
Somali dictator Siad Barre, instigator of genocide.

During the ongoing conflict between the forces of the Somali National Movement and the Somali Army, the Somali government's genocidal campaign against the Isaaq took place between May 1988 and March 1989. According to Alex de Waal, Jens Meierhenrich and Bridget Conley-Zilkic:

What began as a counterinsurgency against the Somali National Movement rebels and their sympathizers, and escalated into a genocidal onslaught against the Isaaq clan family, turned into the disintegration of both government and rebellion and the replacement of institutionalized armed forces with fragmented clan-based militia. The genocidal campaign ended in anarchy, and the state collapse that followed bred further genocidal campaigns by some of the militia groups that then seized power at a local level.

In 1987, Siad Barre, the president of Somalia, frustrated by lack of success of the army against insurgents from the Somali National Movement in the north of country, offered the Ethiopian government a deal in which they stop sheltering and giving support to the SNM in return for Somalia giving up its territorial claim over Ethiopia's Somali Region. Ethiopia was in agreement and a deal was signed on 3 April 1988 that included a clause confirming agreement not to assist rebel organisations based in each other's territories. The SNM felt the pressure to cease their activities on the Ethiopia–Somalia border, and decided to attack the northern territories of Somalia to take control of the major cities in the north. The brutal nature of the Siad Barre government response was unprecedented, and led to what Robin Cohen described as one of the "worst civil wars in Africa".

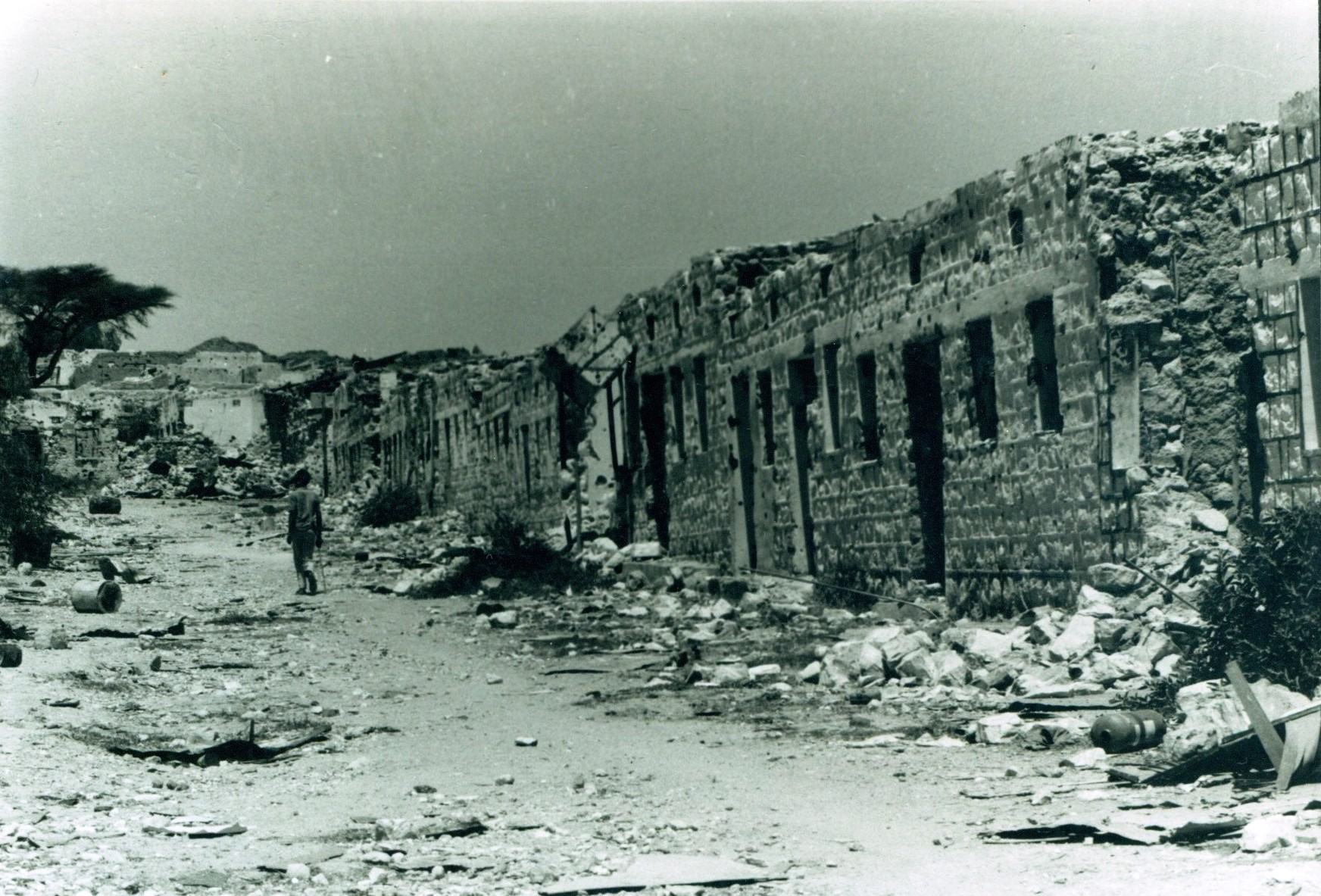
Up to 90% of Hargeisa (2nd largest city of the Somali Republic) was destroyed.

Barre's response to the SNM attacks was of unparalleled brutality, with explicit aims of handling the "Isaaq problem", he ordered "the shelling and aerial bombardment of the major cities in the northwest and the systematic destruction of Isaaq dwellings, settlements and water points". The Siad Barre regime targeted civilian members of the Isaaq group specifically, especially in the cities of Hargeisa and Burco, and to that end employed the use of indiscriminate artillery shelling and aerial bombardment against civilian populations belonging to the Isaaq clan.

Bruce Jentleson, former director of the Sanford School of Public Policy, describes the massacre of Isaaq civilians as follows:

Government forces responded with "appalling savagery", targeting the entire Isaaq civilian population with arrests, rape, mass executions, and indiscriminant shooting and bombing, Hundreds of thousands of Isaaq refugees fled for their lives across the Ethiopian border; government warplanes strafed them as they fled. As many as fifty thousand Somalis died, and the city of Hargeisa was virtually levelled in what outside analysts depicted as a genocidal campaign by the Barre regime against the Isaaq.

The use of large-scale aerial bombardment was unprecedented in the history of African civil unrest. The brutal response of the Siad Barre government did not stop there. In discussing the systematic way in which the government targeted Isaaq people to inflict as much loss in property and life, Waldron and Hasci published the following account:

General Mohammed Said 'Morgan', one of Siad Barre's sons-in-law, [was given] the opportunity to put into operation further elements of a pacification plan he had drawn up earlier. Government forces reacted with appalling savagery to the SNM seizure of Burao and near capture of Hargeisa. The response culminated in the bombing and artillery bombardment of Hargeisa to a point of virtual destruction. Civilian refugees fleeing towards the border were bombed and gunned down indiscriminately. It was seen, probably rightly, as an attack on the whole Isaaq people...

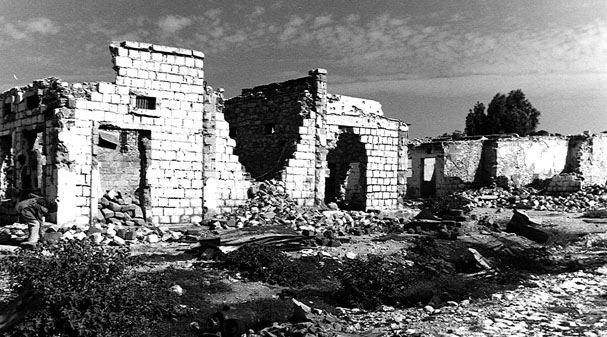
The attack on Hargeysa combined the use of artillery shelling and aerial bombardment.

Within the first three months of the conflict, Isaaqs fled their cities on such a large scale that cities of the north became devoid of their population. Civilian Isaaqs were "killed, imprisoned under severe conditions, forced to flee across the border, or became displaced in the far-off countryside".

The Siad Barre government adopted a policy that "any able-bodied Isaaq who could help the SNM had to be killed. Those who could be of financial help or influence to the SNM, because of social status, were to be put in prison." Though this policy did not exclude children or the elderly, the result was that "more than 90% of the people killed were between the ages of 15-35 years."

Somali historian Mohamed Haji Ingiriis refers to "the state-sponsored genocidal campaigns leveled at the Isaaq clan-group", which he notes is "popularly known in public discourses as the 'Hargeisa Holocaust'" as a "forgotten genocide".

A number of genocide scholars (including Israel Charny, Gregory Stanton, Deborah Mayersen, and Adam Jones) as well as international media outlets, such as The Guardian, The Washington Post and Al Jazeera among others, have referred to the case as one of genocide.

=== 27 May: Burao ===
The Somali National Movement attacked and captured the city of Burao (then the third largest city in the country) on Friday 27 May. They captured the town in two hours and immediately took over the military compound at the airport (where the largest number of soldiers were stationed), the Burao central police station and the prison, where they freed political prisoners (including schoolchildren) from the city's main jail. The government forces retreated, regrouped at Goon-Ad just outside the city, and in the late afternoon, entered the centre of town. According to reports by Human Rights Watch's Africa Watch, the soldiers, upon entering the city, went on a rampage on 27 and 28 May. This included "dragging men out of their houses and shooting them at point blank range," and summary killing of civilians; the report also noted that "civilians of all ages who had gathered in the centre of town, or those standing outside their homes watching the events, were killed on the spot. Among the victims were many students." There was also widespread looting by the soldiers, and some people were reportedly killed as a result.

Following the first two days of the conflict, angered by the extent to which Isaaqs welcomed the SNM incursion, and frustrated by their inability to contain the SNM advance, the military started attacking the civilian population without restraint "as if it was the enemy". The military used "heavy artillery and tanks, causing severe damage, both to civilians and to property. Bazookas, machine guns, hand grenades, and other weapons of mass destruction were also directed against civilian targets in Hargeisa, which had also been attacked as well as in Burao."

A United States Congressional General Accounting Office team reported the Somali government's response to the SNM attack as follows:

The Somali army reportedly responded to the SNM attacks in May 1988 with extreme force, inflicting heavy civilian casualties and damages to Hargeisa and Burao....The Somali military resorted to using artillery and aerial shelling in heavily populated urban centres in its effort to retake Burao and Hargeisa. A majority of the refugees we interviewed stated that their homes were destroyed by shelling despite the absence of SNM combatants from their neighbourhoods....The refugees told similar stories of bombings, strafings, and artillery shelling in both cities and, in Burao, the use of armored tanks. The majority saw their houses either damaged or destroyed by the shelling. Many reported seeing members of their families killed in the barrage....

Refugee interviews conducted by Africa Watch described how the government separated the non-Isaaqs from the Isaaqs before the attack was initiated:

As soon as the fighting broke out, the government used loudspeakers to sort the civilians out into Darood and Isaak. They would shout, "Who is from Galkayo? Mogadishu? Las Anod? Garoe?" [Non-Isaaq territory]. They appealed to the non-Isaaks to leave so they could burn the town and all those who remained behind. Most of the people from these towns left; the government provided them with transportation.

==== Aerial bombardment and destruction of Burao ====
Somali Air Force aircraft started intense aerial bombardment of Burao on Tuesday 31 May. Burao, then the third largest city in Somalia was "razed to the ground", and most of its inhabitants fled the country to seek refuge in Ethiopia. Foreign aid workers who fled the fighting confirmed that Burao was "emptied out" as a result of the government's campaign.

=== 31 May: Hargeisa ===
Hargeisa was the second largest city of the country, it was also strategically important due to its geographic proximity to Ethiopia (which made it central to military planning of successive Somali governments). Preventing the city from falling to the SNM became a critical goal of the government both from a military strategy standpoint and the psychological impact such loss would have.

As news of the SNM advance on Burao reached government officials in Hargeisa, all banks were ordered to close, and army units surrounded the banks to prevent people from approaching. Both electricity and water-supply lines were cut from the city, and residents resorted to fetching water from streams, and due to it being the rainy season they were also able to collect water from rooftops. All vehicles (including taxis) were confiscated to control the movement of the civilian population; this also ensured sufficient transport was available for the use of military and government officials. Top government officials evacuated their families to the capital Mogadishu. The period between 27–31 May was marked by much looting by government forces as well as mass arrests. Killings in Hargeisa started on 31 May.

A curfew was imposed on 27 May starting at 6:00 p.m.; the army began systematic house-to-house searches, looking for SNM fighters. On the following day the curfew started earlier at 4:00 pm; the third day at 2:00 pm; and on the fourth day at 11:00 am.

Anticipating fighting to start, people stockpiled food, coal, and other essential supplies. Government forces looted all warehouses and shops, with the open market of the city being one of their prime targets. Soldiers raided mosques and looted their carpets and loudspeakers. Later, civilians would be killed inside mosques. A significant number of civilian deaths at the time occurred as a result of government soldiers robbing them; those who refused to hand valuables (watches, jewellery and money) or were not quick enough to comply with soldiers' demands were shot on the spot. Another major cause of civilian deaths was food robbery; this was reportedly because the soldiers were not being supplied by the government.

==== Mass arrests in Hargeisa ====
The government, upon hearing of the SNM attack on Burao, began rounding up Isaaq men fearing they would assist an SNM attack on Hargeisa. Detainees were taken to several locations including Birjeeh (a former military headquarters of the 26th Division of the Somali Armed Forces), Malka-Durduro (a military compound), the Central Prison of Hargeisa, the headquarters of NSS (National Security Service), the headquarters of the Military Police as well as other secret detention centres. Isaaq military officers were one of the first groups to be arrested. According to Human Rights Watch's Africa Watch, some 700 Isaaqs from the armed forces were brought to one prison; this particular prison was already overcrowded, and an additional 70 military personnel were then also brought for detention (40 from Gabiley and 30 from Hargeisa). Arrests were done at such a scale that, to make room for the Isaaq detainees, all non-Isaaqs were released, including those sentenced to death or life imprisonment for murder and drug-related offences. Some of those released to make room for Isaaq detainees were given arms and made guards over Isaaq detainees whilst others joined the military.

==== The Hargeisa campaign ====
The SNM attack on Hargeisa started at 2:15 a.m. on 31 May. The government forces took a day or two to devise a plan by which they could defeat the SNM. Their counter-attack started with the use of heavy weapons. These included long-range artillery guns that were placed on the hilltops near the Hargeisa Zoo; artillery guns were also placed on the hilltops behind the Badhka (an open ground used for public executions by the government). They then began to shell the city. The Human Rights Watch report includes testimony by foreign relief workers evacuated to Nairobi by the United Nations. One of them was Jean Metenier, a French hospital technician in Hargeisa, who told reporters upon arrival at Nairobi airport that "at least two dozen people were executed by firing squad against the wall of his house and the corpses subsequently dumped on the streets to serve as an example." The attacks on civilians were the result of the military's realisation the local Isaaq population of Hargeisa welcomed the SNM attack. This was the military's attempt at "punishing the civilians for their SNM sympathies" as well as an attempt to "destroy the SNM by denying them a civilian base of support".

==== Aerial bombardment and destruction of Hargeisa ====
Artillery shelling of Hargeisa started on the third day of the fighting and was accompanied by large-scale aerial bombing of the city carried out by aircraft of the Somali Air Force. Somali government aircraft "took off from the Hargeisa airport and then turned around to make repeated bombing runs on the city".

The scale of destruction was unprecedented, up to 90 percent of the city (then the second largest city in Somalia) was destroyed, (United States embassy estimated 70 percent of the city was damaged or destroyed). The testimony of Aryeh Neier, the co-founder of Human Rights Watch, confirms the large-scale nature of government attacks against civilians:

In an attempt to dislodge the SNM, the government is using artillery and air bombardment, especially Hargeisa and Buroa, daily, aiming particularly at civilian population targets. Reports from eyewitnesses speak of the town of Hargeisa as mere rubble, devastated to the point that it is barely recognizable even to its inhabitants.

The Guardian reported the scale of destruction as follows:

The civil war left Hargeisa in ruins: 80 percent of the building in the town were destroyed, many of them by the aerial bombardment of General Siad Barre's Zimbabwean mercenary pilots. The view from the air is of a town without roofs. The exposed pale green and blue plaster walls reflect the sunlight.

Many of the houses are boarded up because of the small anti-personnel mines scattered by Gen Siad Barre's forces when tens of thousands of Hargeisa residents fled. What was not destroyed was looted.

Other descriptions of what took place in Hargeisa include:

Siad Barre focused his wrath (and American-supported military might) against his Northern opposition. Hargeisa, Somalia's second city and the former capital of British Somaliland, was bombed, strafed and rocketed. Some 50,000 people are believed to have lost their lives there as a result of summary executions, aerial bombardments and ground attacks. The city itself was destroyed. Streams of refugees fleeing the devastation were not spared by government planes. The term "genocide" came to be used more and more frequently by human rights observers.

Amnesty International confirmed the large-scale targeting and killing of civilian population by Somali government troops. The campaign had destroyed Hargeisa, causing its population of 500,000 to flee across the border and the city was "reduced to a ghost town with 14,000 buildings destroyed and a further 12,000 heavily damaged". The Congressional General Accounting Office team noted the extent to which residential districts were especially targeted by the army:

Hargeisa, the second largest city in Somalia, has suffered extensive damage from artillery and aerial shelling. The most extensive damage appeared to be in the residential areas where the concentration of civilians was highest, in the marketplace, and in public buildings in the downtown area. The U.S. Embassy estimated that 70 percent of the city has been damaged or destroyed. Our rough visual inspection confirms this estimate.

Much of Hargeisa appears to be a "ghost town," and many homes and buildings are virtually empty. Extensive looting has taken place even though the military has controlled the city since late July 1988. We were told that private property was taken from homes by the military in Hargeisa. Homes are devoid of doors, window frames, appliances, clothes, and furniture. The looting has resulted in the opening of what are called "Hargeisa markets" throughout the region, including Mogadishu and Ethiopia, where former residents have spotted their possessions. One observer remarked that Hargeisa is being dismantled piece by piece. We were told that long lines of trucks heavily laden with Hargeisa goods could be seen leaving the city, heading south towards Mogadishu after the heavy fighting had stopped.

The Governor of Hargeisa estimates the present population to be around 70,000, down from a pre-conflict population figure of 370,000. However, the current residents of Hargeisa are not believed to be the former Issak residents. Observers believe that Hargeisa is now composed largely of dependents of the military, which has a substantial, visible presence in Hargeisa, a significant number of Ogadeni refugees, and squatters who are using the properties of those who fled.

The report also stated that the city was without electricity or a functioning water system, and that the Somali government was "actively soliciting multilateral and bilateral donors for reconstruction assistance" of cities primarily destroyed by the government's own forces.

=== Berbera ===
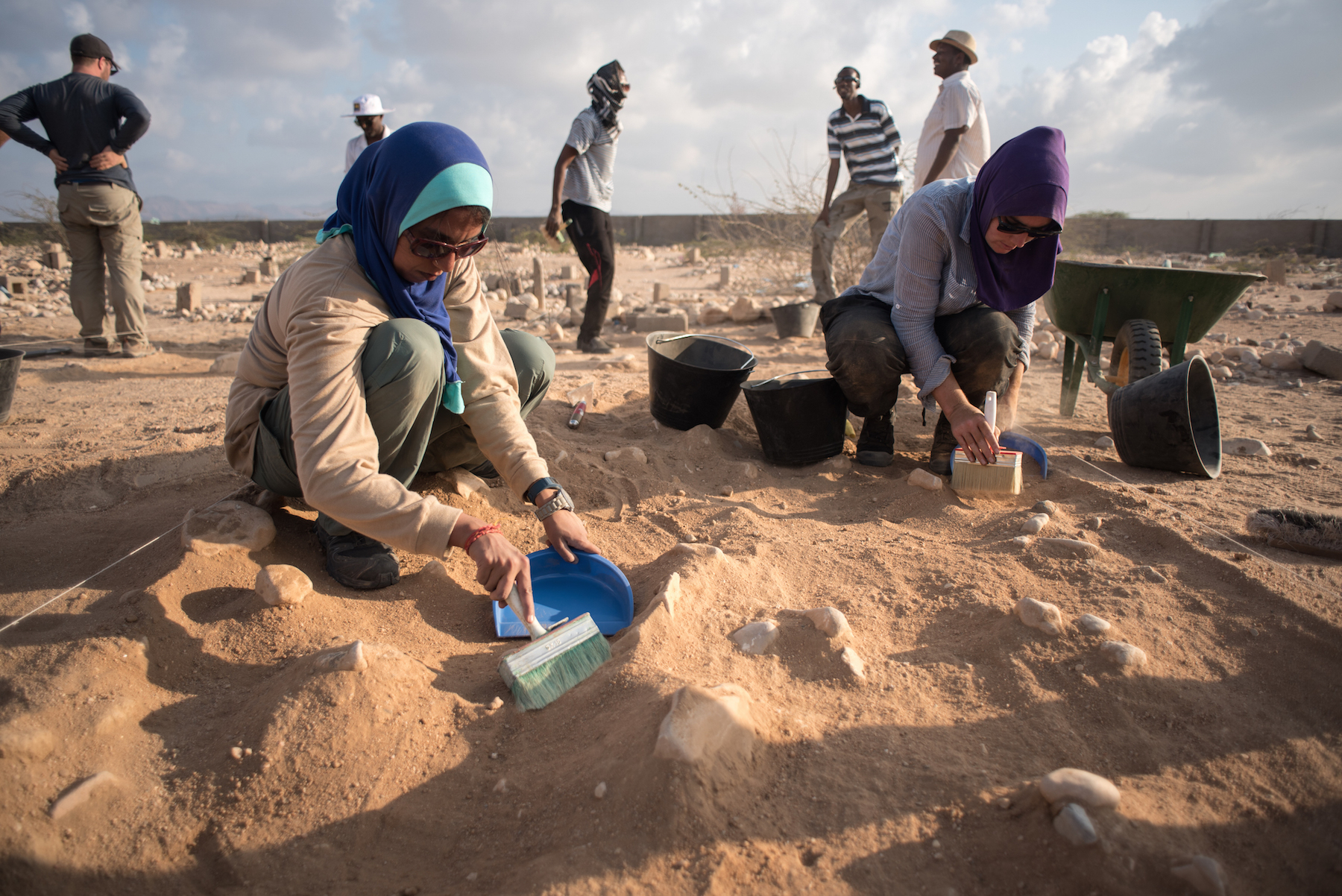
A forensic investigator brushes away soil from the top of a mass grave containing 17 bodies buried 30 years prior in Berbera

Berbera, a city on the Red Sea coast, at the time the principal port of Somalia after Mogadishu, was also targeted by government troops. Atrocities committed in Berbera by the government against Isaaq civilians were especially brutal—Human Rights Watch reported that Berbera had suffered "some of the worst abuses of the war" even though the SNM had never launched an attack on Berbera like they did on Burao and Hargeisa.

Government attacks on Berbera included mass arrests, wanton killing of civilians, confiscation of civilian property, especially cars, luggage, and food at the city's port, which were taken to Mogadishu. Modes of transport belonging to Isaaq civilians were confiscated by force; only military transport was allowed in the city.

==== Mass arrests ====
Immediately after the SNM attack on Burao, the government started a campaign of mass arrests in Berbera. Many Isaaq businessmen and elders were arrested as the government suspected they would support an SNM attack on Berbera.

Between 27 May and 1 June, planes which brought soldiers from Mogadishu carried Isaaq detainees on the return flight. The killing of detainees started when orders came from Mogadishu to cease the transfer of detainees. Arrests usually happened at night and were carried out by the Hangash forces.

==== Arrests and killings of Isaaq passengers on the ship "Emviyara" ====
On 21 June, a ship called 'Emviyara' had docked at the port of Berbera. The passengers were Somalis deported from Saudi Arabia after being imprisoned there before the war broke out. They were deported due to accusations by Saudi authorities of irregularities in their residence documents. Human Rights Watch reports that "out of about 400 passengers, 29 men identified themselves as Isaaks. There were many others, but they claimed to be from other clans." The commander of the Hangash forces at Berbera and his deputy, Calas and Dakhare respectively, "sorted out the passengers according to their clan". Those confirmed to be Isaaq were taken to the Hangash compound where their belongings and money were confiscated. Some were severely tortured and had become permanently paralyzed as a result of the torture. Eight of the passengers detained were killed; the remaining 21 were imprisoned in Berbera and later released.

==== Mass killings ====
Atrocities committed by government forces in Berbera are especially notable because no fighting between government forces and SNM had taken place there, and as such the government had no pretext to commit atrocities against Isaaq civilians in Berbera (and other Isaaq settlements not attacked by SNM). According to Human Rights Watch, the city had suffered "some of the worst abuses of the war even though the SNM never attacked Berbera".

As soon as news of the SNM's attack on Burao reached government authorities in Berbera, the city was completely blocked, and hundreds of people were arrested. "More than 700 experienced worse deaths than had occurred elsewhere in the region." Methods of killing included the slitting of throats, garrotting, the cutting of the back of the neck, and getting severely disabled by beating with clubs before getting shot. The killings took place near the airport at a site about 10 kilometers from Berbera, and were conducted at night. The victims were killed in batches of 30-40. Most of them were men of fighting age that "the army feared would join the SNM," and a few women were also among the victims.

Between June and the end of September, government forces as well as armed Ethiopian (Ogadeni) refugees continued to raid the immediate vicinity of Berbera as well as the villages between Berbera and Hargeisa. The attacks included the burning of villages, the killing of villagers, the raping of women, confiscation of livestock, and the arrest and detention of elders in Berbera. Some of these villages included Da'ar-buduq, which lies half-way between Hargeisa and Berbera; Dara-Godle, which lies 20 kilometers southwest of Berbera; Sheikh Abdal, near the central Mandera Prison; Dubato; Dala, located east of Mandera Prison; and Lasa-Da'awo.

The genocide continued in Berbera as late into the conflict as August 1990, when a group of 20 civilians was executed by the military in reprisal for an SNM ambush that happened in Dubar, near Berbera, the incident demonstrated that "the genocide continued in Berbera longer than other cities."

===== Burning of Isaaq civilians in Berbera =====
Human Rights Watch's Africa Watch also reported the case of 11 Isaaq men, some of whom were nomads, being arrested by the government on the outskirts of Berbera. They were accused of helping the SNM. The Marine Commander of Berbera, Colonel Muse 'Biqil', along with two other senior military officers, ordered the 11 nomads to be burnt alive. The burnt nomads were buried in a spot about 10 kilometers east of Batalale, a communal beach and tourist spot in Berbera.

=== Erigavo ===
Like Berbera, Erigavo was an Isaaq-inhabited city that the SNM did not attack; it has experienced no armed conflict between the SNM and the Somali army for at least several months, yet civilian Isaaqs have suffered both killings and arrests there at the hands of the army and other government forces.

The army started its campaign in Erigavo soon after the outbreak of fighting in Burao and Hargeisa. Hundreds of civilians were killed, and SNM forces did not reach that part of the country until 1989. One incident following a brief capture of the town in 1989 saw 60 Isaaq elders, who could not escape the city due to the difficult mountainous terrain, get taken out of their homes by government forces and were "shot by a firing squad against a wall of the public relations office". Several large mass graves were found in Erigavo in 2012. On 16 March 1989, SNM forces captured and held Erigavo for three hours before leaving the town. Despite an agreement between Somalian authorities and Isaaq elders that the Somalian military would not engage in reprisals against the civilian population, the Somalian army reportedly bombarded the town and then went in, killing an estimated 500 remaining members of the Isaaq clan. A woman who had visited the town the following month, and who was interviewed by Africa Watch in London, described the incident:

I was told that the SNM had attacked the town at the end of March and killed a lot of soldiers; the militias had fled; two days later, the militias returned and killed a lot of Isaak civilians. People were apparently shot even inside mosques. There are mass graves everywhere. I left Erigavo on 23 July

In January 1989, Oxfam Australia (at the time known as Community Aid Abroad), an aid agency which was based in Erigavo and ran a primary healthcare program for the Sanaag region, withdrew its program after operating for eight years in Somalia. It published a report "to draw attention to recent events in Somalia which have resulted in civil war, a huge refugee problem, persecution of a large section of the population along tribal lines and widespread human rights violations". The report denounced the "lack of basic freedom and human rights" in Somalia, which resulted in the agency's decision to leave Somalia due to what it described as a "drastic decline in security and human rights". The report noted that the agency's staff have reported "many violations of human rights for which they believe the Somali Government must take the main responsibility". In describing the government's response to the SNM offensive, the report observed:

The government response to the attack has been particularly brutal and without regard to civilian casualties – in fact there is ample evidence that civilian casualties have been deliberately inflicted so as to destroy the support base of the SNM, which is composed mainly of people from the Isaaq tribe. Following the SNM attacks on the major towns of Hargeisa and Burao, government forces bombed the towns – causing over 400,000 people to flee the atrocities across the border into Ethiopia, where they are now located in refugee camps, living in appalling conditions, with inadequate water, food, shelter and medical facilities.

In Sanaag region, access to villages by CAA staff was denied by the military and project resources such as vehicles and drugs misappropriated by government officials. This combined with poor security, made primary health work impossible and endangered the lives of staff, leading to a withdrawal by the agency. Project staff were frequently harassed by the military even when attending medical emergencies, and on one occasion shots were fired.

Whilst human rights have been deteriorating for some years in Somalia...we believe that the government must bear a particularly heavy responsibility for events over the last six months.

With regards to atrocities specific to Erigavo, the report noted:

The military occupation of Erigavo has resulted in widespread suffering for the people of that area, forcing many people to flee to the bush, including most of the population of Erigavo. It is believed that the military gave the elders of the village money in payment for boys as young as twelve and thirteen years of age. Untrained and disciplined, these youths were armed with AK47s and sent to patrol the town, unsure and ignorant of how to use their newly acquired power.

The report noted one case where a 13-year-old girl from Erigavo was raped by six government soldiers; it also stated that "looting, raping and bashing are commonplace." In a separate case, a man leaving Erigavo with money and food was "robbed, beaten and shot by the military". His body was then "dumped in the town and was eaten to the waist by hyenas".

In describing the Somali government policies in the region, Peter Kieseker, a spokesman for the CAA, commented: "Genocide is the only word for it."

=== El Afweyne ===
In El Afweyn in the Sanaag region and its surrounding territory, "over 300 persons were killed in October 1988 in revenge for the death of an army officer who was killed by a rebel-laid landmine."

Oxfam Australia (formerly known as Community Aid Abroad) described the situation in El Afweyn as follows:

It is known that many people have fled from the town of Elafweyn following bombing attacks by the government forces. A "scorched earth" policy applied to the villages in the Elafweyn plains. These displaced people are hiding in the bush without adequate access to food and medical supplies.

=== Sheikh ===
When news of the outbreak of fighting in Burao reached Sheikh, government-armed Ogadeni refugees in the area, as well as the army units stationed there, started to kill civilians and loot their homes. The government continued to commit atrocities in Sheikh despite the lack of SNM activity there. There were also widespread arrests of Isaaq men in the area; they were usually detained at a nearby military compound.

=== Mogadishu ===
The government's victimisation of the Isaaq was not limited to northern regions susceptible to SNM attacks. During the period of unrest in the north of the country, the government started arresting civilian Isaaq residents of the capital, Mogadishu. Those arrested Isaaqs included businessmen, Somali Airlines staff, army officers, employees of relief agencies, and civil servants. Similar to the case in Berbera, Erigavo, Sheikh and other towns in the north, there was no SNM activity in Mogadishu, moreover, Mogadishu was geographically removed from the situation in the north of the country due to its position in the southern regions, nevertheless the Somali government committed to its policy of persecution of Isaaq civilians in Mogadishu.

Over 300 Isaaq detainees were held the National Security Service headquarters, at Godka, another NSS facility (prison), at a military camp at Salaan Sharafta, at Laanta Bur Prison, a maximum security prison 50 kilometers from Mogadishu. They were taken out of their homes in Mogadishu in the middle of the night of 19 July 1989. Most of the detainees were released only after bribes were paid.

The small hotels of Mogadishu were searched by the government at night, and their guests were sorted into Isaaqs and non-Isaaqs; the Isaaqs would then be subsequently detained.

On government orders, all Isaaq senior officials were proscribed from leaving the country for fear they would join the SNM. One example of this is the case of Abdi Rageh, a former Isaaq military officer, who was forcibly removed from a flight leaving for Frankfurt. Another example of this policy is the arrest of Omar Mohamed Nimalleh, a businessman and a former colonel in the police who was arrested at the airport on his way to Kenya on a business trip.

==== Jasiira beach massacre ====
On 21 July 1989, following religious disturbances that occurred a week earlier, 47 middle-class Isaaq men living in the capital city of Mogadishu were taken from their homes in the middle of the night; they were then transported to Jasiira, a communal beach west of Mogadishu, and summarily executed. These men included professionals, businessmen, and teachers.

According to Claudio Pacifico, an Italian diplomat who at the time was the second in command at the Italian Embassy in Mogadishu and was present in the city at the time, it was the commander of the armoured division of the Somali army, General Ibrahim Ali Barre "Canjeex", who personally oversaw the midnight arrests of the Isaaq men and their transfer to Jasiira beach.

=== Attacks on Isaaq nomads by Ogadeni refugees in the countryside ===
The countryside was an area of operations for the government-armed Ethiopian (Ogadeni) refugees. Human Rights Watch reported that the refugees often "rampaged through villages and nomadic encampments near their numerous camps and claimed the lives of thousands of others, mostly nomads".

According to a foreign aid-agency official who was in the north after the fighting broke out:

the Siyad Barre government was so eager to arm the Ogaden refugees that it enlisted workers of the civilian National Refugee Commission – which administers the Ogaden refugee camps – to help distribute weapons... 'Now all the camps are heavily armed' an experienced Western aid official said. Some of the camps' adult males are thought to have headed for the bush to avoid being drafted by the government... Many others are said to have accepted weapons from the government and left their camps in search of Isaaqs ... Recent travellers in the north added that many Ogaden Somalis from the UN refugee camps – and a fair number of another pro-government group, the Oromo, have been seen carrying American M-16 rifles.

The Ogadeni refugees formed militant groups that hunted Isaaq civilians around Bioley, Adhi-Adais, Saba'ad, Las-Dhureh, Daamka and Agabar refugee camps. In many cases, the Isaaq victims were left unburied "to be eaten by wild beasts".

=== Strafing of Isaaq refugees ===
Atrocities committed by Barre's forces against Isaaqs included the strafing (i.e., machine gunning from aircraft) of fleeing refugees until they reached safety at the Ethiopian borders.

African historian Lidwien Kapteijns describes the ordeal of Isaaqs refugees fleeing their homes as follows:

Throughout this period, the whole civilian population appears to have become a target, in their homes and anywhere they sought refuge. Even during their long and harrowing exodus – on foot, without water or food, carrying the young and weak, giving birth on the way – across the border to Ethiopia, planes strafed them from the air.

Genocide scholar Adam Jones also discusses this particular aspect of the Siad Barre's campaign against the Isaaq:

In two months, from May to July 1988, between 50,000 and 100,000 people were massacred by the regime's forces. By then, any surviving urban Isaaks – that is to say, hundreds of thousands of members of the main northern clan community – had fled across the border into Ethiopia. They were pursued along the way by British-made fighter-bombers piloted by mercenary South African and ex-Rhodesian pilots, paid $2,000 per sortie.

Despite the government's continued refusal to grant international human rights organisations and foreign journalists access to the north to report on the situation, The New York Times reported the strafing of Isaaq refugees as part of its coverage of the conflict:

Western diplomats here said they believed that the fighting in Somalia, which has gone largely unreported in the West, was continuing unabated. More than 10,000 people were killed in the first month after the conflict began in late May, according to reports reaching diplomats here. The Somali Government has bombed towns and strafed fleeing residents and used artillery indiscriminately, according to the officials.

=== Use of mercenaries by the Somali government ===
In addition to using both air and ground military capabilities against the Isaaq, the Somali government also hired South African and Rhodesian mercenaries to fly and maintain its fleet of British Hawker Hunter aircraft and carry out bombing missions over Isaaq cities.

In addition to the "systematic destruction of Isaaq dwellings, settlements and water points", bombing raids were conducted on major cities in the northwest regions inhabited mainly by Isaaq on orders of President Barre.

The Guardian reported the brutal campaign by the Somali government against the Isaaq:

Hundred of Thousands of people have been killed, dispersed or bombed out of their homes in northern Somalia after government military operations which Western aid workers say are little short of genocide.

The action has been concentrated on the three northern towns of Hargeisa, Berbera and Burao where some 20,000 people are believed to have died in recent bombing raids by the government ... Many thousands of others are being systematically denied food because Somali forces are deliberately holding up essential supplies. Aid officials said that up to 800,000 people – almost all of them Issaq nomads – have been displaced as a result of the civil war. A quarter of these, and possibly as many as 300,000, were now struggling to survive in wretched conditions in refugee camps in Ethiopia while a similar number had been forced to leave Africa. The fate of those who can no longer be traced remains largely unknown.

... Until about eight months ago, the urbanised population of Issaqi were concentrated in Hargeisa, Berbera and Burao. Although few journalists have been authorised to visit the area, tens of thousands of people are understood to have died during a series of bombing raids on the towns last August conducted mainly by mercenaries recruited in Zimbabwe.

... "they just bombed and bombed and bombed," an [aid] agency man, recently returned from Somalia said. Hargeisa which originally had a population of 350,000, was 70 percent destroyed, Burao was "devastated" in the same raids.

Issaqis who survived the bombings are said to have been rounded up in the streets by Somali troops and summarily shot. Mass graves have since been found as well as corpses which were left to rot in the streets where they fell.

The people now living in the three towns are believed to be totally non-Issaqi or military personnel who have been deputed to guard what has been retaken from the SNM.

=== Government use of land-mines ===
A particularly enduring aspect of the conflict was the Somali government's use of anti-personnel land-mines in Isaaq cities. An emblematic aspect of Siad Barre's government's "policy of genocide towards the Issak group of clans" was the laying of "over one-million unmarked mines, booby traps and other lethal devices in the Northern Region..." over the duration of the conflict. The exact number of landmines is unknown but estimated to be between one and two million, most of them planted in what was then known as northern Somalia.

The anti-personnel mines were used to target Isaaq civilians returning to cities and towns as they were planted in "streets, houses and livestock thoroughfares to kill, maim and deter return". Most of the mines were "scattered across pastoral lands or hidden near water holes or on secondary roads and former military installations".

In February 1992, Physicians for Human Rights sent a medical team to the region to examine the scale of the problem of land-mines left over from the 1988–1991 conflict, they have described the situation as follows:

They [mines] are most prevalent in the countryside surrounding two of Somaliland's principal cities, Hargeisa and Burao, and in the pastoral and agricultural lands west of Burao. Now that the civil war has ended, the victims of mines have been principally civilians, many of whom are women and children.

The Somali army mined and blew up many of Hargeisa's principal buildings such as "the Union Hotel and a private maternity clinic near the Sha'ab girls School", this was done in an attempt to clear the area between them and the SNM. Residential properties which were near important government offices were also blown up.

The Somalia Handbook for U.S. armed forces notes that "the landmine problem in Somalia can be described as a general problem in the southern sectors of Somalia and a very serious problem in the northern sectors." In describing the prevalence of land-mines especially in the countryside surrounding cities inhabited by Isaaq, the Somalia Handbook states, "Large patterned minefields, exceeding 100,000 mines have been emplaced in sections surrounding the city. Extensive boobytrap activity has also been reported from Hargeysa."

==== Mining of grazing and agricultural land ====
The use of landmines by government forces against civilians was especially damaging in this particular region due to the majority of Isaaqs (and other northern Somalis) being pastoral nomads, reliant on the grazing of sheep, goats, and camels. A report commissioned by the Vietnam Veterans of America Foundation describes the ramifications of this tactic as follows:

The Siad Barre government also mined rural areas to disrupt the economy and the nomadic population, who were seen as the base of support of the SNM. Agarey, Jajabod, Dalqableh, Ubaaleh, Adadley and Farjano-Megasta were affected. Dry-season grazing land and areas close to permanent water sources at higher elevation were particularly hard hit. There are landmines at such high-altitude grazing areas between Burao and Erigavo. Large areas of grazing land in Zeyla were also mined... One consequence of landmines was the cessation of sheep exports to Saudi Arabia and Yemen.

One of the most densely mined areas in the north were the agricultural settlements around Gabiley and Arabsiyo. It is reported that thousands of people were affected by mining in that area, by either abandoning their farmlands entirely due to land-mines or by severe restrictions on farming due to the presence of mines in their fields or the roads network.

==== Mining of civilian homes ====
Physicians for Human Rights describe one tactic employed by Barre's troops in their campaign against the Isaaq people of the north:

One of the cruelest – and clearly unlawful – tactics used by Siad Barre's troops was the deliberate mining of civilian homes. In 1988, government forces shelled and bombed the capital of Hargeisa. Before fleeing, many residents buried their valuables in holes dug in the floors or courtyards of their homes. Upon discovering these stashes, soldiers removed the jewellery and other valuables and placed booby-traps or mines in these hiding places. After the fighting ceased, many of those who had fled returned to their homes in the first months of 1991 only to be injured or killed by these hidden explosives... Some families were said to be squatting outside their houses because they were afraid to enter.

... Siad Barre's forces deliberately mined wells and grazing lands in an effort to kill and terrorize nomadic herders whom the army viewed as protectors of the SNM. While direct evidence is not available, most observers agree that Siad Barre's forces undertook this extensive mining to prevent resettlement by the predominantly Isaak nomads and agriculturists.

The British mine-clearing company Rimfire, contracted by the United Nations High Commissioner for Refugees to conduct de-mining activities has identified land-mines from 24 countries in Somalia. The majority were from the Czech Republic, Russia, Pakistan and Belgium.

==== Use of land-mines at water sources ====
The Barre government also mined water sources during its campaign against Isaaq civilians. This was especially harsh due to the region's semi-arid climate and frequent water shortages. Hargeisa's main water supply, the Gedebley reservoir and its pumping station, were surrounded with minefields by the government. The deep water wells at Sab'ad refugee camp was also surrounded by a minefield. A report published by Mines Advisory Group noted, "At Ina Guha, 42 out of 62 small water reservoirs were mined and unusable". At Tur Debe, government forces destroyed wells by using mines as demolition explosives. The water well at Selel-Derajog was "destroyed and cemented over by government forces...". Similarly "all water sources in Dalqableh were mined, as was the main watering point for nomads between Qorilugud and Qabri Huluul. Water reservoirs at War Ibraan and Beli Iidlay were mined."

=== Reported acquisition of chemical weapons ===
During the government campaign against the Isaaq in 1988 and 1989, numerous credible reports by the US and international media reported that Somalia had received shipments of chemical weapons from Libya. NBC News reported a story on 12 January 1989 that the Reagan Administration "had information eight months earlier that Libyan President Muammar Gaddafi gave Somalia chemical weapons". The US State Department denied the account, but NBC stood by its story when questioned by a Congressional office. Two weeks later, on 25 January The Washington Post reported that the government of Gen. Mohammed Siad Barre "is stockpiling chemical weapons in warehouses near its capital, Mogadishu". These reports state that canisters of the nerve gases Soman and Sarin were unloaded from a Libyan Airlines civilian flight to Mogadishu on 7 October. The British Foreign Secretary Geoffrey Howe stated that the British Government was "deeply concerned" about authoritative reports that chemical weapons had been received in Somalia. The Somali government, represented by Prime Minister Mohammad Ali Samatar has denied possession of chemical weapons.

== Targeting of other groups ==
The Isaaq clan was not the only target of violence. Many other Somali communities, such as the Umar Mahmud sub-lineage of Majeerteen also became the victims of the violence and war. A US Country Study handbook describes the Barre regime retaliation against the Umar Mahmud following a failed coup attempt in 1978 which resulted in 2,000 Umar Mahmuud civilians dying in Mudug. According to Rebecca Richards, the violence in the north and northwest was disproportionate but affected many communities, particularly Isaaq. The shelling, aerial bombing, and associated mass deaths in many communities particularly targeted the members of the Isaaq clan, states Richards, and this systematic state violence was linked to the belief that these groups were obtaining assistance from the Ethiopian government. The harsh reprisals, widespread bombing and burning of villages followed every time there was an attack by SNM believed to be hiding in Ethiopia.

Taisier M. Ali states that Barre assuaged the Majerteen and targeted other groups like the Hawiye. According to Ali, "with funds and clan appeals, he [Barre] was able to entice the bulk of SSDF fighters to return from Ethiopia and participate in his genocidal wars against the Isaq in the north and later against the Hawiye in the South, including Mogadisho".

According to some observers such as the International Crisis Group, while the violence under Barre affected many communities in Somalia, "no other Somali community faced such sustained and intense state-sponsored violence" as the Isaaq. African historian, Lidwien Kapteijns in discussing the targeting of Isaaq people as a distinct group in relation to other groups also targeted by the Barre government states:

Collective clan-based violence against civilians always represents a violation of human rights. However, when its goal is to exterminate and expel large numbers of people based on their group identity alone, it becomes clan cleansing. No one has suggested this term for the collective brutalization of the people of Mudug [Majerteen]. However, for the Northwest [Isaaq], this and even stronger terms (such as genocide) are regularly used. The scale and character of the collective clan-based violence committed against Isaaq civilians – who, although they were not the only civilians brutalized by the government, were especially targeted – suggest that this dimension of state-violence in the Northwest [Isaaq territory] indeed amounts to clan cleansing.

According to Mohamed Haji Ingiriis, the atrocities during the reign of Barre were not an isolated event nor unusual in Somalia's history. Barre also targeted the Hawiye. But, states Ingiriis, Barre extermination campaigns against other clan groups reflected the deep-seated historic cycles of repressions by the clan that gains dominant power then marginalizes other clans.

== See also ==
- Burundian genocides
- Rwandan genocide
- Factions in the Somali Civil War
- Genocides in History
- Mass killings under communist regimes
- Somali Civil War (2009–present)
- War in Darfur
- War in Somalia (2006–2009)
- Ethnic cleansing of the Rahanweyn
