= Treasury Police =

Treasury Police may refer to:

- United States Treasury Police
- United States Mint Police
- Treasury Police (El Salvador)
- Guardia de Hacienda (Guatemala)
