= Rakiya Omaar =

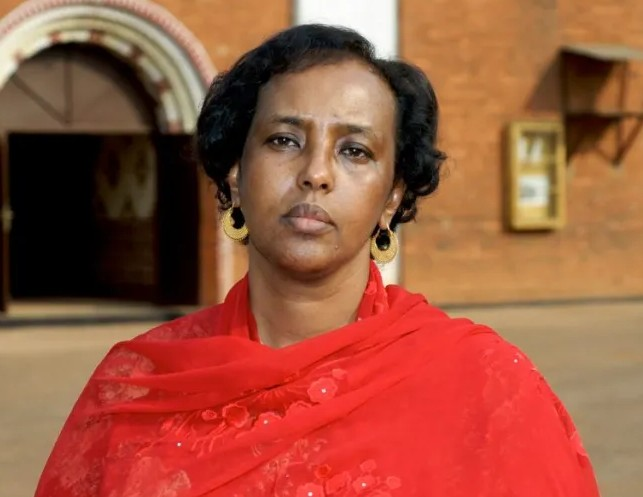
- Born: 1956 (age 69–70); Hargeisa, Somaliland Protectorate
- Education: Political science
- Alma mater: Oxford University
- Occupation: Human rights activist
- Relatives: Mohamed Abdullahi Omaar; Rageh Omaar

Rakiya Abdullahi Omaar (Somali: Rakiya Cabdullahi Omaar, Arabic: راكية عبد الله عمر ) is a human rights activist, lawyer, and writer known for her work on African conflicts, humanitarian crises, and human rights advocacy. She was a founding member and former executive director of Africa Watch (now part of Human Rights Watch) and later co-founded the London-based organization African Rights.

Her report called Somalia: a government at war with its own people, documented instances of human rights abuses in northern and southern Somalia. The report has been widely received and cited to substantiate the Isaaq genocide

== Early life ==
Rakiya was born in 1956 to her father, Abdillahi Omaar, and her mother, Sahra Abdulqadir. She has four siblings: her brother Mohamed, her sister Saynab, and her brother Rageh.

Her father, Abdullahi Omar, founded one of the first Arabic-language newspapers in Hargeisa, Al Liwa, in 1958. The paper's co-founder and editor-in-chief was Ahmed Jim’ale, who later became the first chairman of the Somali National Movement. In 1967, Rakiya's father moved his business operations to London. And in 1973, he moved the family to the United Kingdom so that his children could receive an education.

Rakiya's father Abdillahi Omaar, died in Hargeisa on 7 June 2009. In an obituary written by former Somaliland presidential advisor Ahmed Arwo, who described him as a longstanding and indispensable supporter of the Somali National Movement. Based in London throughout the conflict, Abdillahi provided sustained financial and political backing to every successive SNM leaderships. Arwo described him as “a firm pillar” of the SNM cause from abroad, quoting that Silanyo, chairman of the SNM and later President of Somaliland had personally acknowledged that Abdillahi had relieved the SNM at its most critical moment.

Ahmed Arwo writes:

Xilligii halganka SNM waxuu ahaa tiir adag oo u fadhiya London, isagoo taakuleyn jiray Hoggaanka kasta oo SNM soo maray, sida uu sheegay Guddoomiyaha Kulmiye Axmed Siilanyo, oo qiray inuu meelo adag SNM cabdillahi Oomaar ka kaafiyey oo gurmadkiisu furdaamiyey.

Translation:

During the SNM struggle, he was a strong pillar in London, supporting every SNM leader, according to Kulmiye Chairman Ahmed Siilanyo, who admitted that he helped the SNM leader...... Abdillahi Oomaar helped us overcome difficult times and that his support opened the way.

== Career ==
=== Human Rights Watch ===
Rakiya holds degrees in history from the University of Oxford, law from the University of Cambridge, and political science from the University of Geneva. After her studies, she became involved in human rights work and African political issues.

In 1988, Rakiya established Africa Watch, a branch of the United States-based organization Human Rights Watch, and began investigating human rights issues in northern Somalia.

In January 1990, as the executive director of Africa Watch, Rakiya published a comprehensive report titled Somalia: A Government at War with Its Own People, which detailed systemic human rights violations and state-sponsored atrocities committed by the Siad Barre regime against the Isaaq clan in northern Somalia following the outbreak of civil war in May 1988. Based on extensive testimonies she and her organization gathered from civilian refugees in Djibouti and the United Kingdom, Rakiya documented that between 50,000 and 60,000 non-combatants were killed by government forces through summary executions, intense artillery shelling, and aerial bombardment of residential areas, including the near-total destruction of Hargeisa and Burao. Furthermore, she exposed a scorched-earth strategy aimed at dismantling the socio-economic base of the Isaaq, characterized by the burning of villages, the deliberate destruction of water reservoirs through landmines, the slaughter of livestock, and the mass displacement of over 400,000 people to refugee camps in Ethiopia, while calling upon international partners, particularly the United States, to halt foreign assistance to the abusive regime.

During 1992, as the famine in Somalia grew worse, she initially called for more international involvement and armed guards to protect food supplies. After that, She opposed the large-scale U.S. and U.N. military intervention in Somalia, arguing that reconstructing the civil society destroyed by Siad Barre required gradual, laborious efforts rather than the brusque irruption of military force. She pointed out that Mogadishu was already flooded with cheap food, mortality rates had dropped, and local relief efforts by the ICRC and Save the Children were managing losses far more successfully than the U.N. contingent. She publicly protested the deployment scale on programs like Today and Crossfire, warning that an invading force entering without consulting Somalis would turn foreign relief workers into targets for terrorist reprisals, render the vital work of Somali clan leaders and doctors impossible, and create armed enclaves that would become mass-killing famine camps due to epidemics. Instead, she advocated for a solution following the diplomatic strategy of former U.N. Special Envoy Mohamed Sahnoun, which involved negotiating with constructive elements of Somali society. In December 1992, because these public protests contradicted the official posture of Human Rights Watch, which welcomed the military intervention, executive director Aryeh Neier dismissed her for serious public misrepresentation of the organization's policy.

In July 1993, Rakiya criticized the ongoing United Nations actions in Mogadishu, comparing the UN to just another military faction. She argued that the United States military bombings were hitting the wrong targets and harming innocent people, and she called for the international forces to work together with traditional Somali structures for long-term reconciliation.

=== African Rights ===
In March 1995, Rakiya co-founded African Rights and published an important book about the Rwandan genocide, titled "Rwanda: Death, Despair and Defiance". Her work provided detailed evidence of the mass killings. She strongly criticized international organizations and foreign governments for their failure to stop the violence and for allowing the perpetrators to rebuild their networks.

In August 2004, a young girl named Samsam Ahmed Duale was arrested in Hargeisa and later faced torture and rape by police officers. This incident caused big emotional feelings and protests among Somali people. Rakiya A. Omaar, the director of African Rights, became one of the first people to speak out publicly about the girl's difficult situation during a radio interview with the Voice of America.

In December 2005, Rakiya spoke in an interview with An Phoblacht, where she explained that her co-founded human rights organization, African Rights, aimed to document conflicts from the perspective of the victims and give them a voice rather than relying on external or international narratives.

In December 2012, it was reported that Rakiya worked as a consultant for the Rwandan government intelligence services. She was hired to build a legal case against Hyacinthe Rafiki Nsengiyumva, a former Rwandan minister and opposition leader. The Rwandan government tried to extradite him from France, but the French court eventually rejected their request.

=== Horizon Institute ===
In 2013, Rakiya set up Horizon Institute, a consultancy company assisting vulnerable communities to transition.

== Evaluations by others ==
In 2016, Luc Reydams, a scholar of political science and international law, criticized Rakiya, noting that African Rights acted as a proxy for the Rwandan Patriotic Front (RPF) regime. He stated that Rakiya maintained an extremely close relationship with the center of the regime, including President Paul Kagame, leading staff to call her "the queen of Kigali," and that the reports she authored contained many inaccuracies.

In 2018, Jonathan Clayton, a Reuters journalist, praised Rakiya's work as a huge service to mankind and criticized Reydams's analysis as character assassination, though he noted that he did not agree with all of the explanations and conclusions made by Rakiya and African Rights.
