= The Oxford Handbook of Carl Schmitt =

2017 book edited by Jens Meierhenrich and Oliver Simons

- Author: Jens Meierhenrich (editor); Oliver Simons (editor)
- Language: English
- Series: Oxford Handbooks
- Subject: Carl Schmitt
- Publisher: Oxford University Press
- Publication date: 9 January 2017
- Publication place: United States
- Pages: 874
- ISBN: 9780199916931

The Oxford Handbook of Carl Schmitt is a 2017 book about the legal scholar and political philosopher Carl Schmitt, edited by Jens Meierhenrich and Oliver Simons for Oxford University Press and its Oxford Handbooks series. It consists of 30 texts written by scholars, intended to provide "an improved understanding of the political, legal, and cultural thought of this most infamous German theorist".
