= Victory Pioneers =

Neighborhood-level secret police unit during Siad Barre regime, Somalia

The Victory Pioneers (Somali: Guulwadayaal) were a neighborhood-level secret police unit active in the closing years of the Siad Barre regime in Somalia, until its overthrow in 1991. Numbering approximately 10,000, they were also known as the "People's Militia".

== Synopsis ==
According to a U.S. Library of Congress Country Study published in 1993, "Pioneer units, [existing] in every town and village, ensured loyalty to Siad Barre's regime by encouraging people to spy on each other in the work place, schools, mosques, and private homes."

After the more widely known NSS was formally dissolved in 1990 as a palliative measure, its functions were taken over by other units within Barré's internal security apparatus, such as the Hangash (a military intelligence unit), the Victory Pioneers, and others.
