= Policia Militar Ambulante =

The Policia Militar Ambulante (Mobile Military Police, Ambulant Military Police or PMA) was an elite paramilitary corp active in Guatemala during the Guatemalan Civil War.

== History ==
Formed in 1965 during the administration of Guatemalan President Enrique Peralta Azurdia, the PMA performed both police and military functions and protected elite interests. Although independent from the military police, the PMA functioned under the direct supervision of the Military of Guatemala and the military intelligence directorate (G-2). Detachments of the PMA were active throughout the country during the conflict, maintaining control over the rural populace and protecting the landowning elite. In addition to regular police functions, the PMA's protection duties included security for both state and private enterprises, and the PMA was divided into two primary segments; one protecting state enterprises (electric plants, train stations, etc.), known as the "ordinaria," and the other for private enterprises (known as the "extraordinaria"). The private businesses protected by the "extraordinaria" segment of PMA included delivery services, banks and multinationals active in the country. The "ordinaria" was composed largely of elite commandos, which were generally better equipped and trained than the "extraordinaria." Members of the PMA "ordinaria" were often ex-military and police, who were accepted into the corps on the basis of their exemplary performance while in the services. In the 1980s, the PMA had up to 2,000 personnel, including retired military officers, 60% of whom worked within the "extraordinaria" branch.

== Involvement in the Civil War ==
The PMA played a vital role in consolidating and maintaining state control in rural Guatemala, providing surveillance, apprehending and interrogating suspected "subversives" and guerrillas, and working with the land elite to discipline the rural workforce, undermine the unions, and suppress worker rebellions at plantations and factories. By the 1970s the PMA had also become an integral part of Guatemala's military intelligence apparatus and was performing more specialized military functions. Between 1980 and 1983, through the presidencies of Romeo Lucas García and Efraín Ríos Montt, the PMA played a key role in the counterinsurgency operations in the predominantly indigenous Altiplano, where the EGP maintained its strongholds.

Throughout the conflict, the PMA maintained a rapid action battalion with a base located 30 miles southeast of Guatemala City near Escuintla, which could be deployed to virtually any region in the country. Until 1984, the PMA's primary urban headquarters were in Guatemala City adjacent to the headquarters of the G-2. After 1984, the G-2 took control of PMA headquarters and used it as an interrogation center.

In July 1988, Defense Minister Héctor Gramajo announced the creation of the Civilian Protection System (SIPROCI). Led by the G-2, SIPROCI synchronized the activities of the PMA, the National Police, the Treasury Police, the Security Section of the Presidential Staff (Archivos). Within the framework of SIPROCI, PMA units were devoted to operations targeted at crime and drugs, and much less towards counterinsurgency activities, having largely succeeded in subduing the insurgency in the early 1980s. It was within this framework that the United States Central Intelligence Agency (CIA) began to transfer the responsibility of funding and training the Guatemalan security forces to the Drug Enforcement Administration (DEA), due in large part to Guatemala's growing drug problem and the resolution of the Cold War.

== Human rights violations ==
"In mid-1979...an informant carried the news to the base that the guerillas had taken the municipality of Uspantán. The captain went with 150 soldiers and went to the aldea of Chicamán to interrogate the people...they tied them up and began to put needles under their fingernails and they were screaming terribly...The captain cut the young man's throat and he made a terrifying noise, fell to the ground and blood poured out...the people began to cry..."

— Testimony of former PMA soldier.

During the Guatemalan Civil War, the PMA was particularly notorious for systematic and widespread human rights violations, including abduction, torture, extrajudicial killing and disappearances. A 1976 Latin American Newsletters described the PMA as "a particularly vicious arm of the security forces." A 1981 Amnesty International report stated that the PMA was "named in many reports of abuses on and around large plantations in rural areas, and of seizure and 'disappearance' of trade union leaders at factories where the PMA provided security services." A report of the Inter-American Commission on Human Rights detailed the systematic murder of over 100 peasants in the municipality of Olopa, Chiquimula by the Mobile Military Police (PMA) detachment of Monteros, Esquipulas between 1977 and 1979. The victims included several religious workers, 15 women and more than 40 children. The PMA were reported by peasants to murder small children in the villages of Olopa by grabbing them and breaking their backs over the knees.

Due to its involvement in human rights abuses, it was required within the framework of UN Peace Accords of December, 1996 that the Mobile Military Police be deactivated and demobilized. This went into effect with the formal signing of the peace accords and the PMA was disbanded in 1997. In 1999, human bones were discovered in a former PMA compound undergoing renovation in Guatemala City. Testing of the remains proved inconclusive. This is consistent with allegations made in a report published on 30 June 1986 by Allan Nairn and Jean-Marie Simon that detainees "were being held at the headquarters of a security force called the Ambulant Military Police (PMA) outside the capital. The prisoners were held in cells hidden behind a concealed door in a building next to the soccer field." The Families of the Detained and Disappeared of Guatemala (known by the acronym FAMDEGUA) estimate that over 3,000 were killed or "disappeared" in custody at PMA headquarters during the conflict. Special Prosecutor Fernando Mendizabal said, "Torture, killing, and illegal burial of people took place at the PMA."

== Academy ==
The CAPMA (Centro de Adiestramiento de la Policia Militar Ambulante) was the primary training center for both the "ordinaria" and "extraordinaria" segments of the Mobile Military Police. Training courses included classes taught by civilians, including doctors, attorneys, and personal defense experts.
