= Guardia de Hacienda =

The Treasury Guard (Spanish: Guardia de Hacienda), also known as the Treasury Police, was a police agency active in Guatemala from 1954 until 1997 when it was formally abolished along with the National Police and the PMA as a result of the peace accords which ended the 36-year Guatemalan Civil War.

== Origins and primary functions ==
The Guardia de Hacienda was reportedly established in 1954 and was formerly supervised by treasury officials. The force had units of varying strength assigned to the capital cities of Guatemala's 22 departments, various crossing points and airports. The manpower of the force was reported in 1982 to total approximately 2,100 agents. Although customs and tariffs have reportedly been the Treasury Police's main concern, the force has also been "involved in antismuggling and anticounterfeiting activities, regulation of immigration and emigration and the issuance of passports," as well as enforcing the laws related to narcotics and alcoholic beverage manufacture and sale.

Tom Barry's 1990 Guatemala: A Country Guide also numbers the Treasury Police at 2,100 members, and states that although "not as large as the National Police, [the Treasury Police] enhances its influence by closely working with the army's G-2 intelligence command". The author states that the Civil Protection System (SIPROCI), a new police unit under the army's High Command coordinating the different law enforcement agencies, "was apparently created in an effort to avoid internecine conflicts between the various units". The author adds that SIPROCI was formed "in the wake of an ongoing dispute between the National Police and the Treasury over an incident in which the National Police arrested members of the Treasury Police who were linked to death squad killings".

== Counterinsurgency activities ==
During the civil war, the Treasury Guard became increasingly involved in political police activities, operating with other police and security forces "by reporting suspicious movements or activities and, when necessary, supplement[ing] other forces in counterguerrilla actions". The Guardia de Hacienda were often referred to as the "little barracks" as they exhibited military discipline. Most guardsmen were former members of the army, Kaibiles (special forces) or the Policia Militar Ambulante (PMA). The Treasury Guard was an organization similar to the PMA in that most of its members had prior military experience.

According to 1970 U.S. Army Area Handbook's description of the Treasury Police:

(The Treasury Police) have been charged with being alert to any indication of subversive activity. They are expected to detect the entry, exit, internal movement or other activity of domestic or alien subversive elements. They are directed to enforce all laws relating to peace and public order, as well as to act as auxiliary to the military in case of national emergency. Under the conditions of instability existing during 1968, the latter responsibilities demanded more of their time and effort than did their primary functions. The training and experience gained in raiding illegal stills proved most valuable in ferreting out guerrilla arms caches.

== Involvement in human rights abuses ==
An untitled mimeograph published in October 1979 by Guatemala's leading peasant group and indigenous rights organization - CUC (Committee for Peasant Unity)- denounced the Treasury Police "one of the most repressive of the police bodies in the country, above all in the Tierra Fría ("Cold Lands," i.e.: highlands) and in the border areas, like San Marcos". The same description adds that the force changed from one of "simple employees" who demanded bribes when allegedly controlling contraband and the making of alcohol, to one of "control and repression" after it came under the control of the Ministry of the Interior in 1974.

During the conflict, a special presidential intelligence agency headquartered within a telecommunications annex of the Presidential Palace (known as Policia Regional, La Regional or Archivos) maintained contacts within the security services known as confidenciales who could be called from provincial army garrisons to be sent to the capital for unspecified purposes. Treasury Police and National Police confidenciales could also be contracted either through provincial army commanders or by direct contact with provincial commanders of the police services. The confidenciales assembled in the capital using this system were often used in covert operations involving the use of "death squads".

The role of Treasury Police personnel in carrying out government sanctioned political murders via the confidenciales system was revealed when two men in plainclothes - identifying themselves as members of the Secret Anti-Communist Army (ESA) - were captured by students after attempting to kidnap student-leader Victor Manuel Valverth. Both assailants were found to be card-carrying confidenciales; one was identified as an agent of Military Intelligence (G-2) and the other reportedly "carried a card issued by the Special Service (Servicio Especial) of the Treasury Police".

== Bibliography ==
- Amnesty International. 1981. Guatemala: A Government Program of Political Murder. London.
- Barry, Tom. 1990. Guatemala: A Country Guide. Albuquerque, New Mexico: The Inter-Hemispheric Education Resource Center.
- Dombrowski, John. 1970. Area Handbook for Guatemala. Washington, D.C.: US Government Printing Office.
- McClintock, Michael. 1985. The American Connection Volume II: State Terror and Popular Resistance in Guatemala. London: Zed Books.
- Nyrop, Richard F.; Studies, American University (Washington, D.C.). Foreign Area; Army, United States. Dept. of the (1984), Guatemala, a country study, The Studies
