= Jens Meierhenrich =

International relations scholar

Jens Meierhenrich is a scholar of international relations at London School of Economics who directs the university's Centre for International Studies.

== Works ==
- Meierhenrich, Jens (2008). The Legacies of Law: Long-Run Consequences of Legal Development in South Africa, 1652–2000. Cambridge University Press. ISBN 978-1-139-47517-4.
- Meierhenrich, Jens, ed. (2013). Genocide: A Reader. Oxford University Press. ISBN 978-0-19-537766-8.
- Meierhenrich, Jens; Simons, Oliver, eds. (2017). The Oxford Handbook of Carl Schmitt. Oxford Handbooks. Oxford University Press. ISBN 9780199916931.
- Meierhenrich, Jens (2018). The Remnants of the Rechtsstaat: An Ethnography of Nazi Law. Oxford University Press. ISBN 978-0-19-881441-2.
