= National Security Service (Somalia) =

Intelligence agency, 1970–1990

- Hay'ada Nabadsugida Qaranka (Somali)
- Coat of Arms of the Somali Democratic Republic

Governmental overview
- Formed: 8 January 1970
- Dissolved: 1990
- Superseding Governmental: National Intelligence and Security Agency
- Type: Intelligence agency Secret police
- Jurisdiction: Supreme Revolutionary Council
- Headquarters: Mogadishu
- Governmental executive: Saleebaan Dafle, Founder
- Parent department: Interior Ministry of the Somali Democratic Republic

The National Security Service (NSS) (Somali: Hay'ada Nabadsugida Qaranka, HNQ) was the primary intelligence agency of the Somali Democratic Republic from 1970 to 1990. The NSS was formed as the secret police under the government of Siad Barre in 1970, modelled after the KGB of the Soviet Union, and was formally dissolved in 1990 shortly before Barre's overthrow. In 2013, the Federal Government of Somalia re-established the NSS as the national intelligence service, renaming it the National Intelligence and Security Agency (NISA).

== Organization and structure ==
The NSS was subordinate to the Interior Ministry, and led by General Ahmed Saleebaan Abdalla ("Dafle") right through the 1970s until the mid-1980s. Abdalla was a son-in-law of the General and a member of the Supreme Revolutionary Council (SRC). After that point, Abdiqasim Salad Hassan directed the agency during the closing years of the Barré regime. Hassan would later become a one-time President of Somalia under the Transitional National Government.

Conceived in the Soviet model and organized with the help of the KGB, the NSS was an elite organization whose key officers maintained close links to Barré's SRC. It built and maintained a wide-ranging network of informers.

== NSS prisons ==
The NSS headquarters and interrogation center in Mogadishu, referred to as Godka or "the Hole", was particularly notorious. Other NSS centers included Mogadishu Central Prison, and stations at Lanta Bur, Labtanjirow and Burwein.

== 1990 dissolution ==
In 1990 the NSS was formally dissolved as a palliative measure. However, its abolition was not accompanied by the demise of other security agencies who also had effectively unlimited powers of arrest and detention and similarly notorious reputations for torture and ill-treatment of detainees. These include the President's own bodyguards, the Red Berets (Duub Cas); the Dhabar Jabinta (or "Backbreakers") a branch of the military police; the Hangash, another branch of the military police; the Guulwadayal (or "Victory Pioneers"), a uniformed paramilitary group; and the investigative wing of the Somali Revolutionary Socialist Party (SRSP).

Similarly, the decision to dismantle the NSC did not guarantee a fair system of justice because other courts, such as the Mobile Military Court and the Regional Security Court, retained the power to sentence people to long prison terms and even death without any pretense of due process. In an effort to show that the government was opening the political system, President Barre resigned as Secretary General of the ruling party, only to be replaced by a son-in-law who for many years headed the NSS.

== Politicians with ties to the NSS ==
Controversy surrounds the activities of the NSS, as well as those politicians who served in or assisted the NSS during the Barre regime. This is a partial list of Somali and Horn of Africa politicians who had known or alleged ties to the NSS:

- Abdiqasim Salad Hassan TNG President of Somalia (2001–2004); as interior minister under Siad Barre, was head of the NSS.
- Ali Mohammed Ghedi TFG Prime Minister of Somalia (2004–present); alleged agent/informer.
- Hassan Abshir Farah TFG Prime Minister of Somalia (2001–2003), Minister of Fisheries (2004–present); allegedly cooperated with the NSS as regional governor in Barre government.
- Dahir Riyale Kahin President of Somaliland (2003–2010) served as the NSS station chief in Berbera.
- Hasan Muhammad Nur Shatigadud TFG Minister of Finance (2005–present); President of Southwestern Somalia (2002–present); Colonel in the NSS
- Ismail Omar Guelleh, President of Djibouti since 1999, was reportedly trained by the NSS.
- Mukther Mohmmed Abdurahman Bullbull Alliance for the Re-liberation of Somalia (ARS) since 2003 to 2011 reportedly trained by the NSS
- Meles Zenawi, Prime Minister of Ethiopia, reportedly came in contact with the NSS and lived in Mogadishu for a period during the Derg era of Ethiopia, allegedly lived with Afwerki
- Isaias Afwerki, President of Eritrea, reportedly came in contact with the NSS and lived in Mogadishu for a period during the Derg era of Ethiopia, allegedly lived with Zenawi

=== Foreign politicians ===
Former Ethiopian president Meles Zenawi and Eritrean president Isayas Afewerki were also alleged to have had contacts with the NSS. IRIN news wrote, citing an unnamed former official of Somalia, that: "Meles knew Somalia very well, as he lived in Mogadishu when he was a liberation leader in the 1980s. Meles and Eritrean leader Isayas Afewerki “lived together in a villa behind Tawfiq Hotel, north Mogadishu, and were handled by the National Security Service, provided with travel documents and Somali passports, trained and given a Tigrayan radio frequency”, a former senior Somali government official told IRIN".

== Successor ==
In January 2013, the new Federal Government of Somalia established the National Intelligence and Security Agency (NISA) in place of the defunct NSS. Mandated with assuring national security, NISA is headquartered in the capital Mogadishu.
