= Hangash =

The Hangash (Somali: Hay'adda Nabadgalyada Gaashaandhiga), an acronym standing for Defence Security Agency, was a notorious secret police unit of the Siad Barre regime in Somalia until his overthrow in 1991.

== Overview ==
Created in the aftermath of the 1978 coup attempt, the official purpose of the Hangash was to maintain surveillance over the Somali Armed Forces and the more widely known National Security Service (NSS). As the Barré government's crackdown on political activity became more severe, however, the Hangash acquired direct powers in civilian matters, overlapping with those of NSS. According to a 1993 Country Study published by the U.S. Library of Congress, "[e]ventually, the Hangash, which operated without legal authority, became more feared than the NSS".

When the NSS was formally dissolved in 1990, many of its activities were subsumed by the Hangash and other institutions comprising the security apparatus of the Barré regime, such as the Mobile Military Court (MMC), the Regional Security Council (RSC), and the Victory Pioneers.
