= Battle of Godey =

Part of the Ogaden War in 1977

- Part of Ogaden War, and Somali invasion of Ogaden
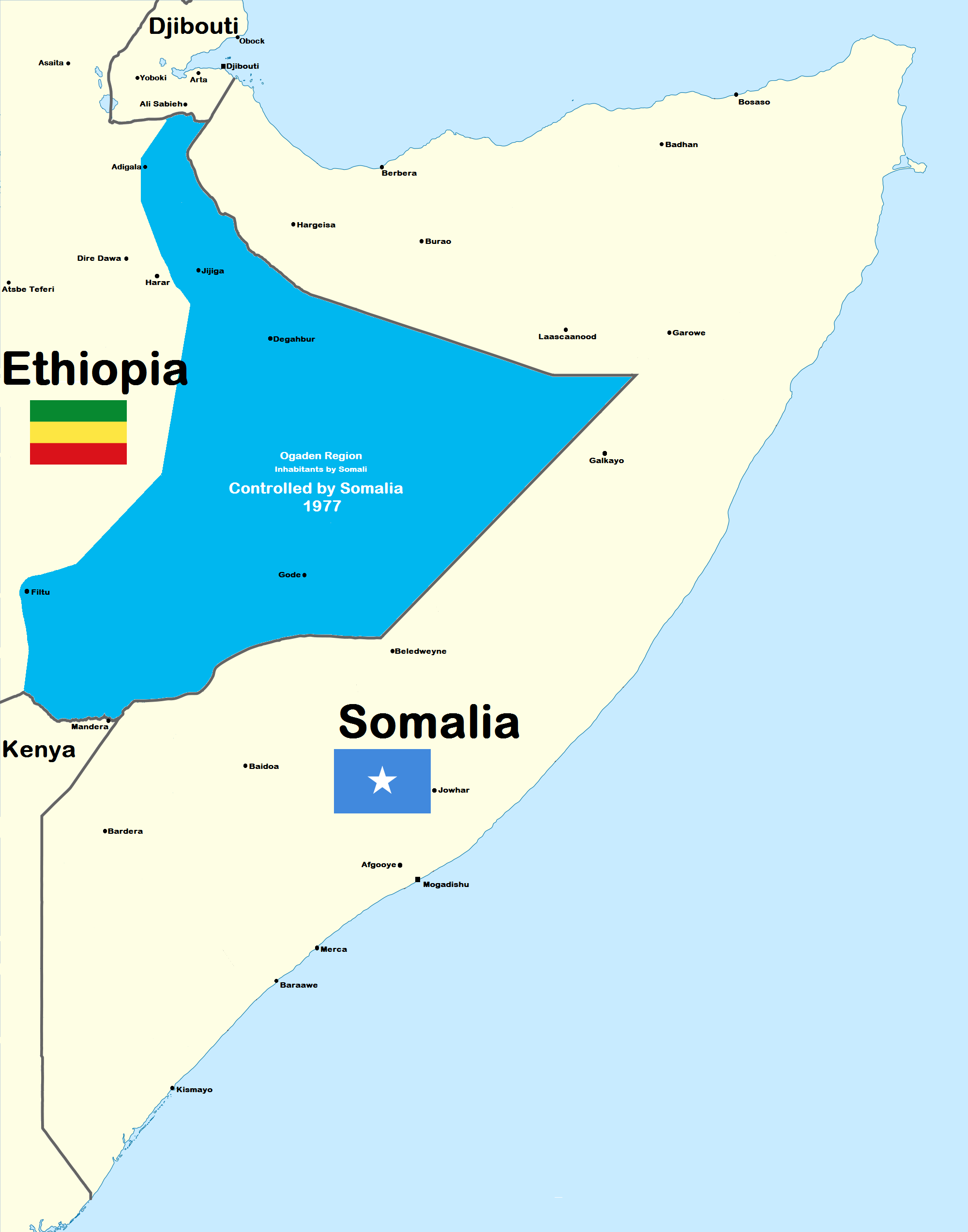
Date	24–25 July 1977
Location	Gode, Somali Region, Ethiopia
Result	Somali victory
Territorial changes	Somali forces successfully capture the city of Godey and surrounding regions

Belligerents
Somalia: WSLF	Derg

Commanders and leaders
(Somalia) Abdullahi Ahmed Irro (Somalia) Abdillahi Askar (Somalia) Mohamed Ali	5th Ethiopian Infantry Brigade

Strength
3,000-5,000	2,350

Casualties and losses
Minimal	1,850 killed two Ethiopian divisions destroyed

The Battle of Godey was a major early engagement in the Ogaden War (1977–1978), in which forces of the Somali Democratic Republic, in coordination with the Western Somali Liberation Front (WSLF), captured the southeastern town of Godey from Ethiopia, between 24 and 25 July 1977. The assault was led by by Colonel Abdullahi Ahmed Irro of Somalia’s 60th Division. The battle was one of the most decisive initial victories for the Somalia in the war.

== Background ==
On 13 July 1977, the Somali Democratic Republic launched a large-scale invasion of Ethiopia’s Ogaden region. Somalia aimed to incorporate Somali-inhabited territory in the Ogaden into a Greater Somalia, fueled by Somali nationalism and freedom for the occupied Somalis. Somali regular forces, numbering around 35,000, advanced with heavy Soviet-supplied weaponry and were supported by approximately 15,000 WSLF guerrilla fighters.

Godey, located along the Shabelle River, was a strategic military hub with an airstrip and supply depot. Its capture would secure a southern supply corridor for SNA advances toward Jijiga, Harar, and other regions in southern Ethiopia such as Bale, and Negele.

== Battle ==
According to Tom Cooper and in a 2025 interview with Somali Stream, Abdullahi Sheikh Hussein stated that the commander of Somali National Army in Godey, Colonel Abdullahi Ahmed Irro , had given interviews to international media, including the Associated Press, following the successful capture of Godey.

The Ethiopian 5th Brigade, part of the 4th Division, was tasked with defending Godey. It was equally equipped as well as Somali forces, but it was cut off from reinforcements. Meanwhile, Somali forces assembled a mechanized assault force under many battalion leaders among them Captain Abdillahi Askar Barkhad, under the leadership of Deputy Commander Lt. Col. Abdulkadir Koosaar and the Commander Colonel Abdullahi Ahmed Irro of the 60th Division. In the days prior to the battle, WSLF insurgents disrupted Ethiopian communications, sabotaged roads, and attacked supply routes, causing the Isolation of the Godey garrison.

Captain Askar dubbed as the lion of Godey by his supporters, is widely recognized as one of several battalion leaders in Godey, aiding the SNA strategy under the leadership of Col. Irro and his deputy Lt Col Kosaar

On the morning of 24 July 1977, Somali and WSLF forces launched a coordinated assault on Godey. The attack began with sustained artillery barrages and air strikes on Ethiopian positions. Somali mechanized columns advanced in a three-pronged attack, whilst guerrillas engaged Ethiopian outposts along the outskirts.

Captain Askar personally led flanking attacks on the garrison headquarters and the airfield, cutting off escape routes. By the afternoon of 25 July, the Ethiopian 5th Brigade had collapsed. Out of an estimated 2,350 troops, only about 500 Ethiopians managed to retreat. The rest concluded dead.

The capture of Godey was one of the largest Somali victories during the Ogaden War. It gave SNA, and WSLF forces a critical foothold in southeastern Ethiopia, and control over a key airstrip. By mid-August 1977, Somali forces controlled over 90% of the Ogaden.

Abdullahi Ahmed Irro was awarded the Medal of Valor for his distinguished service during the Ogaden War. Irro was arrested for alleged involvement in the 1978 failed coup attempt but was found not guilty and released at a later time.

== See also ==
- Ogaden War
- Battle of Jijiga
- Somali invasion of Ogaden

== Bibliography ==
- Ayele, Fantahun. The Ethiopian Army: From Victory to Collapse, 1977–1991. Northwestern University Press, 2014.
- Cooper, Tom. Wings Over Ogaden: The Ethiopian–Somali War, 1978–1979. Helion & Company, 2015.
- Tareke, Gebru. The Ethiopian Revolution: War in the Horn of Africa. Yale University Press, 2009.
- Lewis, I.M. A Modern History of the Somali: Nation and State in the Horn of Africa. Ohio University Press, 2002.
- Laitin, David D. Somalia: Nation in Search of a State. Westview Press, 1977.
