= Mohamed Osman Irro =

Colonel who led 1978 Somali coup attempt

Mohamoud Sheikh Osman Irro محمود عثمان عرو
- Born: 1943; Bokh, Somalia
- Died: October 26, 1978 (aged 35 years); Mogadishu, Somalia
- Cause of death: Execution by firing squad
- Burial place: Xero Dhiig
- Alma mater: M. V. Frunze Military Academy
- Military career
- Allegiance: Somalia
- Branch: Somali Armed Forces; Somali National Army
- Service years: 1963—1978
- Rank: Colonel
- Nickname: Cirro
- Conflicts: Ogaden War; 1978 Somali coup attempt

Mohamud Osman Irro (Somali: Maxamuud Ismaan Cirro, Arabic: محمود عثمان عرو; 1943 – October 26, 1978), also known as Mohamud Sheikh Osman Irro (Maxamuud Shiikh Cismaan Cirro) or Mohamud Sheikh Osman Irro (Maxamuud Sheekh Cismaan Cirro), was a prominent Somali military figure. Irro was involved in the 1977 Ogaden War. Later, he masterminded the 1978 Somali coup attempt and was executed by the Siad Barre regime.

== Biography ==
A Colonel in the Somali National Army (SNA), Mohamud Sheikh Osman Irro was among the military officials that were executed by the government on suspicion of involvement in the abortive 1978 coup d'état attempt. He was held to have been the group leader, along with alleged co-conspirators Abdullahi Yusuf Ahmed and Abdullahi Ahmed Irro.

Most of the officers who had helped plot the coup, including leader Irro, were tried by court-martial, found guilty and executed. Others, including fellow Frunze Military Academy graduate Colonel Abdullahi Yusuf Ahmed, managed to escape abroad. Yet others including Colonel Abdullahi Ahmed Irro and the chief of the national police General Abdullahi Matukade were court-martialled and found not guilty after the military court could not find evidence of collaboration with Irro.

== See also ==
- Mohammad Ali Samatar
- Abdullah Mohamed Fadil
- Abdullahi Yusuf Ahmed
- Abdullahi Ahmed Irro
- Yussuf Salhan
- Muse Hassan Sheikh Sayid Abdulle
