= Abdullahi Ahmed Irro =

Somali General and military professor (1937–2022)

Abdullahi Ahmed Yussuf Irro عبد الله أحمد إرو
- Cabdullaahi Axmed Yuusuf Cirro
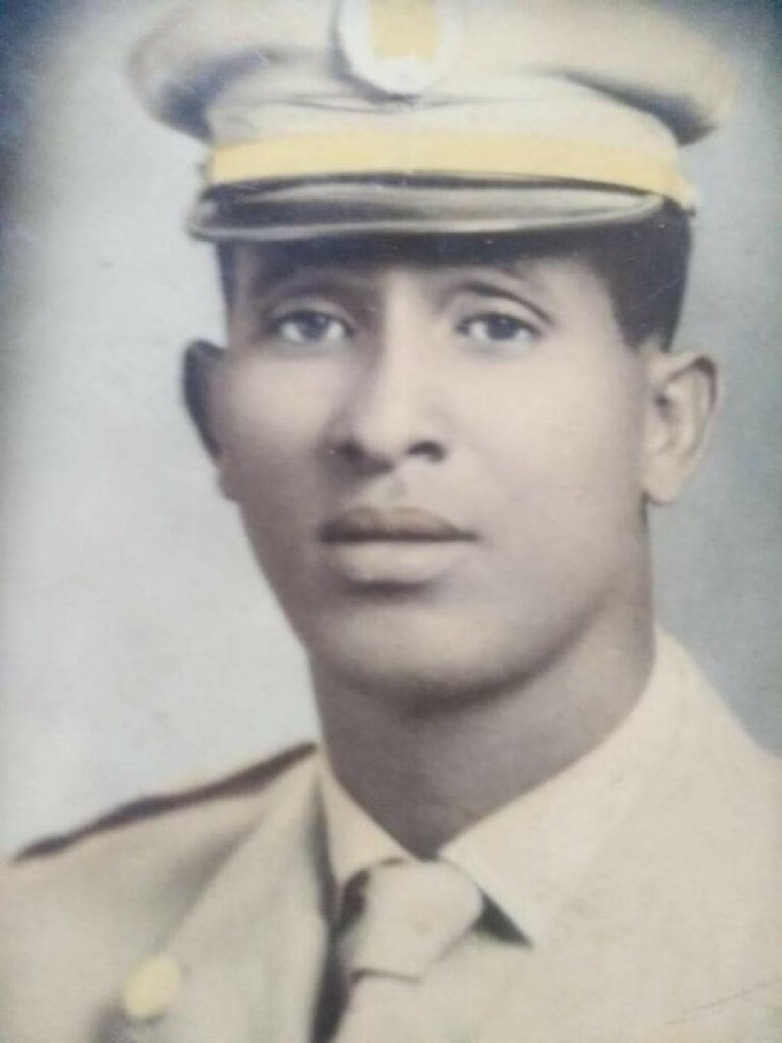
- Young Irro
- Born: 7 June 1937; Kismayo, Italian East Africa
- Died: 24 January 2022 (aged 84); Falls Church, Virginia, U.S.
- Education: (Egypt) Egyptian Military College (Soviet Union) Frunze Military Academy (Russian: Военнаяакадемия им М. В. Фрунзе)
- Military career
- Allegiance: Somalia
- Branch: Somali National Army
- Service years: 1950s–1980s
- Rank: Major general
- Nickname: Irro
- Commands: Commandant of Godey Front; Deputy Commander of 21st Division; Commander of 60th Division
- Conflicts: Ogaden War
- Other work: National Academy for Strategy of Somalia

Abdullahi Ahmed Irro (Somali: Cabdullaahi Axmed Yuusuf Cirro; b. June 7, 1937 - d. January 24, 2022 Arabic: عبد الله أحمد إرو), AKA Abdullahi Ahmed Yussuf Irro, was a prominent Somali military professor and a general. He helped establish the National Academy for Strategy.

== Early years ==
Irro was born in the southern town of Kismayo, Somalia, to a Majeerteen Harti Darod family. Irro's father Ahmed Yussuf Irro and two of his uncles served in the Italian colonial army. They were among Migiurtinia's youth who were forcibly conscripted after the fall of the ruling northern Majeerteen Sultanate (Migiurtinia) and Sultanate of Hobyo (Obbia) during the annexation campaign against the " Northern Sultanates', a fascist expedition from 1922 to 1929 under the command of Cesare Maria De Vecchi of the National Fascist Party led by Benito Mussolini. Irro's mother, Zhabah Hosh Ellie, was the daughter of an aristocratic wazir of the Obbio Sultanate.

Irro spent the better part of his adolescence in Mogadishu, where he was educated in Italian primary and secondary schools. He subsequently studied at the local two-year teacher's training Instituto Universario Della Somalia, graduating with honours. Following the completion of his studies, Irro worked for a few years in the late 1950s as an instructor.

== Military career ==
=== Training ===
After Somalia obtained its independence in 1960, Irro joined the nascent Somali National Army (SNA), becoming the force's 32nd officer.

Irro received military instruction at the Egyptian Military College in Cairo, Egypt in 1961. He graduated from the college with a Bachelor's degree in Military Sciences. Irro subsequently returned to Somalia where he worked in the office of the central command and the directorate of planning under Daud Abdulle Hirsi, and Siad Barre in 1960s, and later under Mohammad Ali Samatar and Abdullah Mohamed Fadil.

Irro along with other left-leaning comrades was later admitted to the Frunze Military Academy in Moscow (Военнаяакадемия им М. В. Фрунзе), an elite Soviet institution reserved for the most qualified officers of the Warsaw Pact armies and their allies. There, he specialized in Strategic Planning and wrote many articles on strategy, operations and contemporary warfare, with an emphasis on Proactive National Defense. Irro published several works in Arabic and Russian analysing conventional warfare in Africa, Asia and Latin America. A distinguished graduate of Frunze, Irro's research focused on the various strategies employed during the Sino-Indian War of 1962 and the Indo-Pakistani conflicts of 1965. Irro eventually completed the rigorous high command training at Frunze, and later received the military doctoral degree (кандидат наук) under the supervision of Soviet military strategist Alexei Radzievsky . Other Somali graduates from the Frunze military institutions included Mohamed Ali Samatar, Salaad Gabeyre Kediye, Abdullahi Yusuf Ahmed, Abdullah Mohamed Fadil, Ali Hussein and Mohamed Farrah Aidid.

== Somali National Army ==
Upon returning to Somalia, Irro occupied various posts in the Somali National Army. He served in the planning and operations sector, heading the directorate of planning in addition to similar positions in the 21st and 60th Divisions. Irro worked his way up the SNA, obtaining the rank of colonel. During the 1970s, he was the deputy Commandant of 21st Division and Commandant of the 60th Division.

=== Ogaden War ===
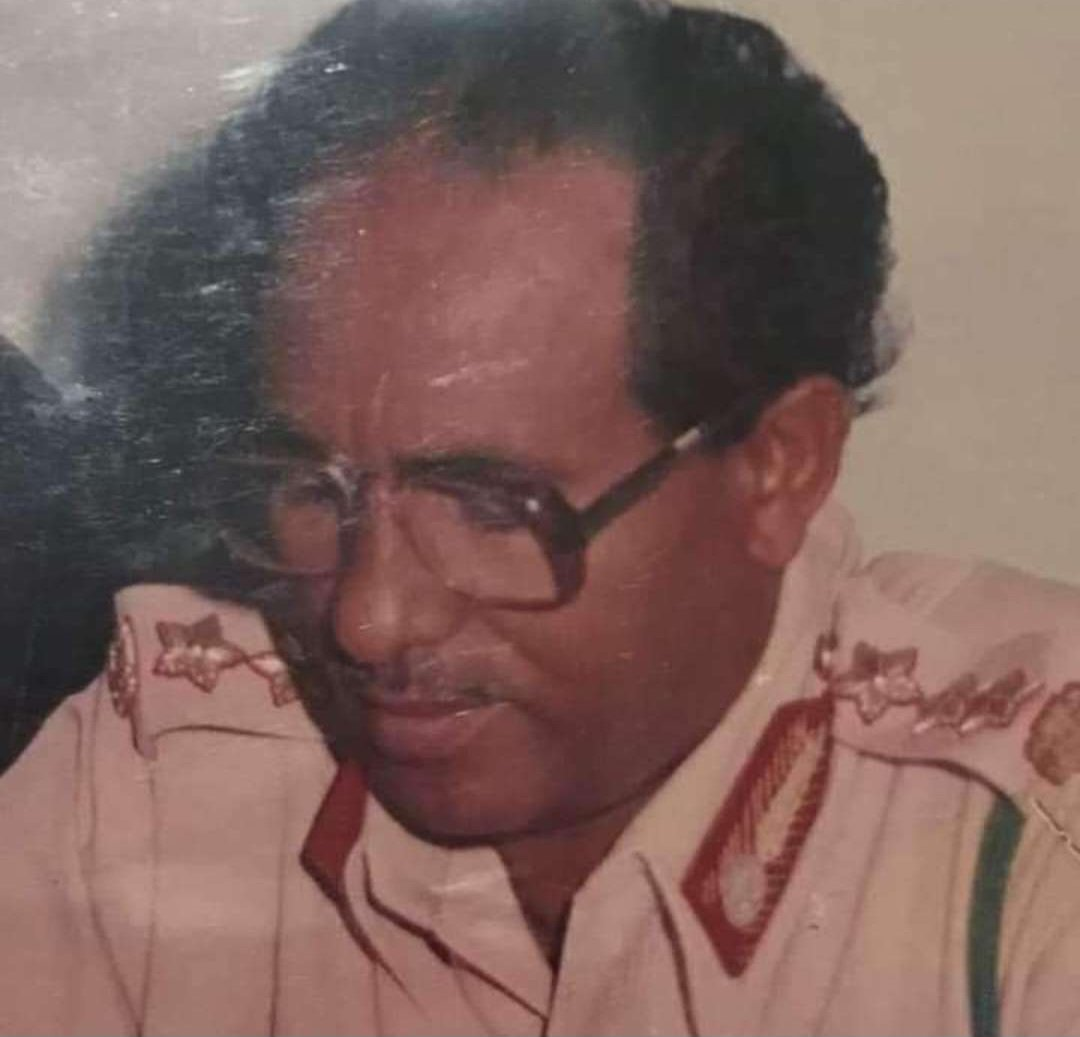
1977 image with Colonel Abdullahi Ahmed Irro, Leader of the 60th SNA Division, on the Godey Mission.

Under the leadership of General Mohamed Ali Samatar, Irro and other senior Somali military officials were mandated in 1977 with formulating a national strategy in preparation for the Ogaden campaign in Ethiopia. This was part of a broader effort to unite all of the Somali-inhabited territories in the Horn region into a Greater Somalia (Soomaaliweyn).

Colonel Abdullahi Ahmed Irro commanded the Somali National Army (SNA) units on the Godey front during the Ogaden War and led the successful capture of the town on July 24, 1977. His commanding leadership in Godey was documented by a delegation of international journalists on July 27, 1977. Footage from the visit, including interviews with Irro, was later released by the Associated Press.

In a 2025 interview with Somali Stream, Abdullahi Sheikh Hussein stated that the commanding officer Colonel Irro had given interviews to international media and the Somali perspective following the successful capture of Godey.

Godey was guarded by the Ethiopian Army's 4th Division, which was based in five local military bases. The Ethiopian defenders were effectively annihilated after the battle of Godey, with only 489 out of the 2,350 men managing to return to Harar, the rest were presumed dead. The 60th division forces under Col Irro consisted of 2nd Armoured Brigade equipped with T-54 MBTs, Infantry as well as an Artillery Brigade 36 artillery and Tank Battalion equipped with T-34 MBTs.

Ethiopia acknowledged the loss of Godey and the direct involvement of Somali troops in July 1977. Subsequently, the Union of Soviet Socialist Republics (USSR) signed a 385 million dollar arms agreement with Ethiopia in early September. Soviet weapons shipments to Somalia had reportedly ceased altogether by late September 1977. Under Irro's leadership, Somalia's 60th Division brigades succeeded in defeating the 4th Ethiopian Division in Godey, causing it to collapse and cease to exist altogether as a functional force. Godey's capture also allowed the Somali side to consolidate its hold on the Ogaden, concentrate its forces, and advance further to other regions of Ethiopia. Units from Somalia's 60th occupied Haile Salase's Imperial Palace where they captured senior Ethiopian officers. The Swedish aviator Carl Gustaf von Rosen was also killed during the battle of Godey.

Following this successful operation at Godey, Irro was appointed Chief Commanding Staff Officer in the 60th Division. He was assigned organization and mobilization duties vis-a-vis various army brigades in the Southern Divisions, including six infantry brigades destined for Negele, beyond Godey towards Bali and Sidamo. Irro was also tasked with supplying logistical and technical support, part of the southern command's contingency plans. In doing so, he was facing off against former Frunze Professor, Vasily Ivanovich Petrov, who was the Red Army General assigned to assist and rebuild the Ethiopian Army. In spite of unreserved support by Cuba, USSR, Southern Yemen and East Germany, it took nearly three years for the Ethiopian Army to gain a full control of the Godey region. Brigadier-General Demissie Bulto, commander of the First Revolutionary Army, recovered Godey as part of Operation Lash by November 1980, nearly three and half years since the Somali Army occupied it in July 1977. Ethiopia's Derg regime would later execute Bulto for his involvement in a failed coup d'état in Ethiopia in 1989.

At the recommendation of the national Ministry of Defense, Irro was awarded the Somali Medal of Valor by President Barre. The medal was issued in recognition of Irro's various contributions to the Military of Somalia. Irro went on to become a general in the Somali National Army.

==== Media Controversy in 1977 ====
According to Abdullahi Hantiwadaag, the former head of Radio Mogadishu, the Somali National News Agency (SONNA) escorted a group of international journalists to Godey on July 25, 1977, a day after the Somali Army captured Godey. Col. Abdullah Ahmed Irro met with the delegation of journalists in Godey. Some Italian journalists questioned Irro as a Somali officer of the rank colonel or General masquerading as WSLF commander. The Italian reporter insisted Italians know Somalis well and Irro could not possibly be a member of the rebel group fighting Ethiopia. The implication is that Somalia's regular army invaded Ethiopia.

Irro during his tenure as an academic in military institutes

== The 1978 coup attempt ==
In 1978, fallout from the aborted Ogaden campaign culminated in an attempt by several Somali senior military officials to overthrow Siad Barre's administration. According to the memoir of the late Colonel Abdullahi Yusuf Ahmed, Irro informed him via a secured communication network that the coup d'état had failed. The transmitted communication contained a coded two sentence message reading "Wife Aborted", dated 11:00 am, April 9, 1978. Irro was arrested a few hours later by the ruling government of President Barre under suspicion of participation in the putsch. Most of the people who had helped plot the coup were found guilty and executed by marshal court; but others, including fellow Frunze Military Academy graduate Colonel Abdullahi Yussuf Ahmed, managed to escape abroad. The coup leader Colonel Mohamed Osman Irro was arrested and executed.

Colonel Abdullahi Irro was arrested and court martialled along with the Chief of the National Police General Abdullahi Matukade and released few years later after court found no concrete evidence of collaboration with Mohamed Osman Irro.

== Later years 1979–1990 ==
Abdullahi Irro later served as a Professor of Strategy at various Somali Military Institutes in the 1980s. In this capacity, he helped put together the National Academy for Strategy, and had a hand in formulating strategic training syllabi for senior military personnel, the presidential advisory councils and legislators. He also played a leading role in forging working partnerships with several schools in Egypt (1983), France (1984) and the United States (1984).

A polymath, Irro remained politically neutral throughout his adult life. He declined various offers to join opposition groups that had begun to form in the wake of the Ogaden campaign, including the Somali Salvation Democratic Front (SSDF), Somali National Movement (SNM) and United Somali Congress (USC) led by his former comrades Abdullahi Yusuf Ahmed, Abdulkadir Koosaar and Mohamed Farrah Aidid, respectively.

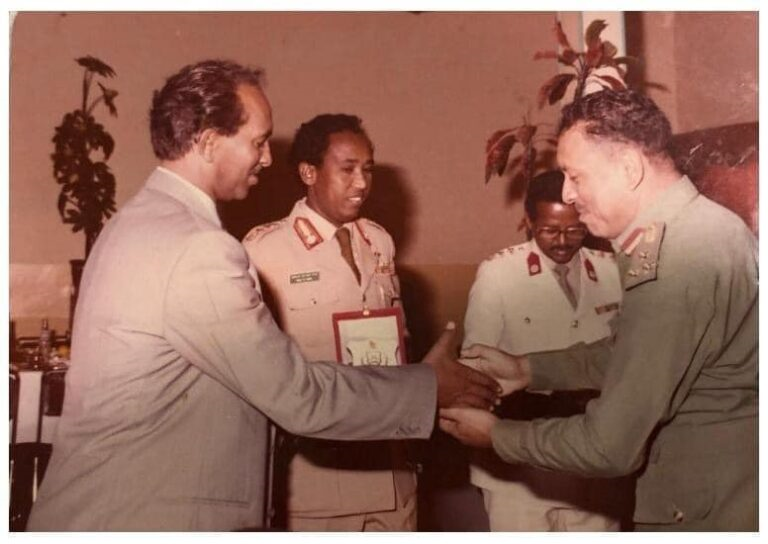
Professor Irro (left) handing an award to a Sudanese Army brigadier at the National Academy for Strategy in the early 1980s

== Post-Civil War ==
General Irro, lived in Vienna, Virginia and occasionally participated in efforts to create a peaceful society in Africa. He was one of 30 senior Somali officials invited by the UN to advise the United Nations. Irro and his colleagues provided a framework document to address strategies for both short-term security challenges and longer-term capacity-building measures.

== Death ==
According to The Washington Post, General Irro died on January 24, 2022 at his home in Falls Church, Virginia. The cause of death was reported to be kidney failure.

== See also ==
- Muhammad Ali Samatar
- Hussein Kulmiye Afrah
- Abdullah Mohamed Fadil
- Ali Matan Hashi
- Ismail Ali Abokor
- Abdirizak Mohamud Abubakar
- Salaad Gabeyre Kediye
- Abdullahi Yusuf Ahmed
- Muse Hassan Sheikh Sayid Abdulle
- Mohamed Osman Irro
- Dahir Adan Elmi
