= Somali invasion of Ogaden =

1977 invasion of Somalia in the Ethiopian territory

- Part of Ogaden War
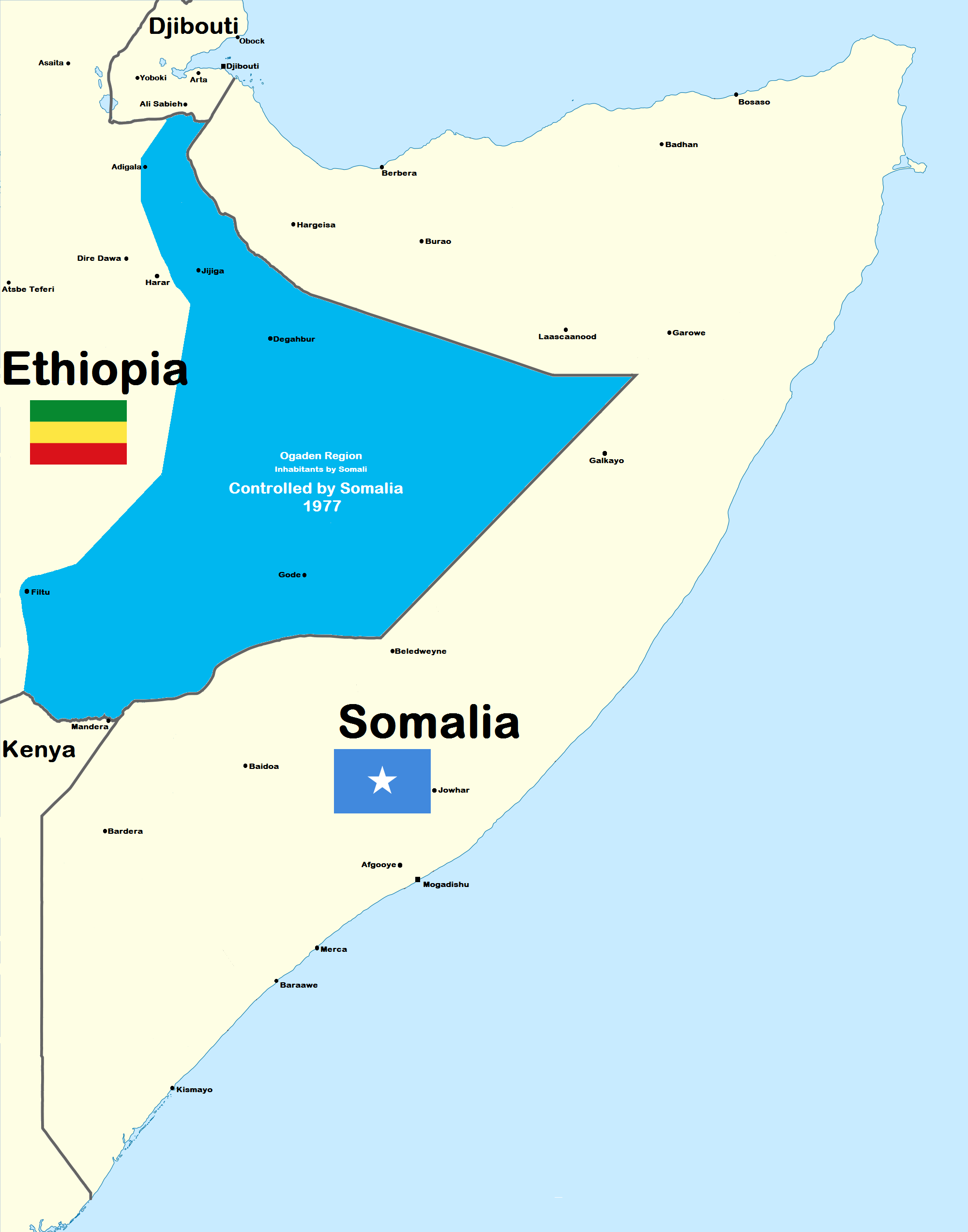
- Extent of Somali territory
Date	13 July 1977 – October 1977
Location	Ogaden, Ethiopia
Result	Somali victory
Territorial changes	Somali forces capture 320,000 sq. km of Ogaden and the entirety of the Haud.

Belligerents
Ethiopia	Somalia; WSLF

Commanders and leaders
(Ethiopia) Mengistu Haile Mariam: (Ethiopia) Tesfaye Gebre Kidan; (Ethiopia) Merid Negussie; (Ethiopia) Fikre Selassie Wogderess	(Somalia) Siad Barre: (Somalia) Mohammad Ali Samatar; (Somalia) Abdullah Mohamed Fadil; (Somalia) Abdullahi Ahmed Irro; (Somalia) Abdillahi Askar; Abdullahi Hassan Mahmoud

Strength
(Derg) 51,000 soldiers (Initially); 45 tanks 58 guns	(Somali Democratic Republic) 25,000 soldiers 200 tanks 250 APCs; 15,000 fighters

The Somali invasion of Ogaden took place in July 1977, when Somalia attacked Ethiopia in two formations. The main force had the aim of seizing Jijiga, Harar and Dire Dawa while a secondary force assaulted Dolo, Gode and Imi. The Somali National Army (SNA) committed to invade the Ogaden on 12 July 1977, according to Ethiopian Ministry of National Defense documents (some other sources state 13 July or 23 July).

== Forces ==
According to Ethiopian sources, the invaders numbered 70,000 troops, 40 fighter planes, 250 tanks, 350 APCs, and 600 artillery, which was almost the whole Somali Army. Soviet officials put the number of attacking Somali forces at 23,000 servicemen, 150 T-34 and 50 T-54/55 tanks, as well as 250 armoured personnel carriers such as the BTR-50PK, BTR-152 and BTR-60PB. In addition to the Somali regular troops, another 15,000 fighters of the Western Somali Liberation Front (WSLF) were also present in the Ogaden.

Ethiopian forces present in the Ogaden were largely composed of the Ethiopian Army's 3rd Mechanised Division, backed by an ad hoc 9th Fighter Squadron equipped with F-5E jet fighters.

== History ==
By the end of July 1977, 60% of the Ogaden had been taken by the SNA-WSLF force, including Gode, on the Shabelle River. The attacking forces did suffer some early setbacks; Ethiopian defenders at Dire Dawa and Jijiga inflicted heavy casualties on assaulting forces. The Ethiopian Air Force (EAF) also began to establish air superiority using its Northrop F-5s, despite being initially outnumbered by Somali MiG-21s. However, Somalia was easily overpowering Ethiopian military hardware and technology. Soviet General Vasily Petrov had to report back to Moscow the "sorry state" of the Ethiopian Army. The 3rd and 4th Ethiopian Infantry Divisions that suffered the brunt of the Somali invasion practically ceased to exist.

By 17 August 1977, elements of the Somali Army had reached the outskirts of the strategic city of Dire Dawa. Not only was the country's second largest military airbase located here, as well as Ethiopia's crossroads into the Ogaden, but Ethiopia's rail lifeline to the Red Sea ran through this city, and if the Somalis held Dire Dawa, Ethiopia would be unable to export its crops or bring in equipment needed to continue the fight. Gebre Tareke estimates the Somalis advanced with two motorized brigades, one tank battalion and one ballistic missile battery upon the city; against them were the Ethiopian Second Militia Division, the 201 Nebelbal battalion, 781 battalion of the 78th Brigade, the 4th Mechanized Company, and a tank platoon possessing two tanks. The fighting was vicious as both sides knew what the stakes were but after two days, despite the Somalis gaining possession of the airport at one point, the Ethiopians had repulsed the assault and forced the Somalis to withdraw. Henceforth this became known as the Battle of Dire Dawa and the city was never again at risk of attack.

By October 1977, Somali Army and WSLF forces controlled up to 90% of Ogaden's territory, about 320,000 square kilometres (120,000 mi^{2}).
