= Battle of Hargeisa (1988) =

Battle between the Somalian regime and the Somali National Movement

- Part of The 1988 Hargeisa-Burao offensive of the Somaliland War of Independence
Date	31 May 1988
Location	Hargeisa, Somaliland
Result	SNM victory
Territorial changes	SNM forces capture Hargeisa aside from the Hargeisa Airport

Belligerents
Somali National Movement	Somali Democratic Republic

Commanders and leaders
Ibrahim Degaweyne; Abdillahi Askar; Muse Bihi Abdi; Hassan Yonis Habane	Gen. Morgan (WIA); Mohammed Hashi Gani; Yusuf Tukeh

Strength
500 men 82 military vehicles	Unknown

Casualties and losses
50,000 killed (including civilians)	1 plane shot down

The Battle of Hargeisa occurred on 31 May 1988 during the Somaliland War of Independence, when the Somali National Movement launched a surprise attack on Hargeisa, a major city in Somaliland.

== Background ==
In the late 1980s, the SNM intensified its insurgency against the regime of President Siad Barre, seeking autonomy for the northern regions. Hargeisa, being a strategic and symbolic city, became a focal point for SNM operations.

== The Battle ==
The SNM attack on Hargeisa started at 2:15 a.m. on 31 May and was led by Colonel Mohamed Ilmi Samatar and Colonel Muse Bihi Abdi. The SNM force attacking Hargeisa was estimated at 500 men equipped with 84 vehicles, of whom only 14 were left due to vehicles being sent to the front in Adadley. The SNM captured the headquarters of the 26th Division, as well as capturing the Birjeex arms depot where the SNM collected ammunition. An SNM fighter who partook in the Hargeisa offensive described Somali troops dropping their uniforms on the ground and fleeing. The SNM encountered stiff resistance from the Somalian Army as they surrounded Radio Hargeisa's headquarters. The Somalian army units withdrew to Hargeisa Airport and the hills east of the city. Due to heavy bombardment from Somalian heavy artillery and tanks, the SNM force tasked with capturing Hargeisa airport fell back and retreated to Adadley.

By 1 June, with the exception of Hargeisa Airport, the SNM overran the city. During the Somali army counterattack the SNM line of defense in the city was behind Hargeisa's radio station.

== Aftermath ==
The SNM's incursion into Hargeisa prompted a fierce response from government forces, led by Gen. Mohamed Said Hersi Morgan. The Somali National Army (SNA) launched counter-offensives involving heavy artillery and aerial bombardments, resulting in widespread destruction and significant civilian casualties. The battle caused a mass exodus of residents, with many seeking refuge in neighboring regions and countries. Despite initial successes, SNM forces eventually withdrew from Hargeisa due to the overwhelming firepower of government troops.

== Significance ==
The Battle of Hargeisa was a turning point in the Somaliland War of Independence. It demonstrated the SNM's capability to challenge the Somali government's control over major urban centers. The extensive destruction and humanitarian crisis resulting from the battle drew international attention to the conflict. The events of 31 May 1988 are commemorated in Somaliland as a symbol of resistance and the struggle for self-determination.
