= HADR =

HADR may be:

- Aba Tenna Dejazmach Yilma International Airport ICAO code
- The combined efforts for humanitarian assistance and disaster relief
- Hughes HR-3000, also known as Hughes Air Defense Radar
