= Operation Lash =

1980 Ethiopian Army counter-insurgency campaign and operation

- Part of Ethiopian-Somali conflict
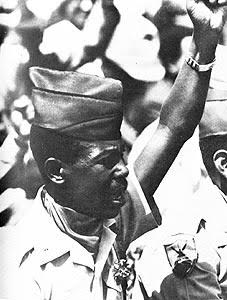
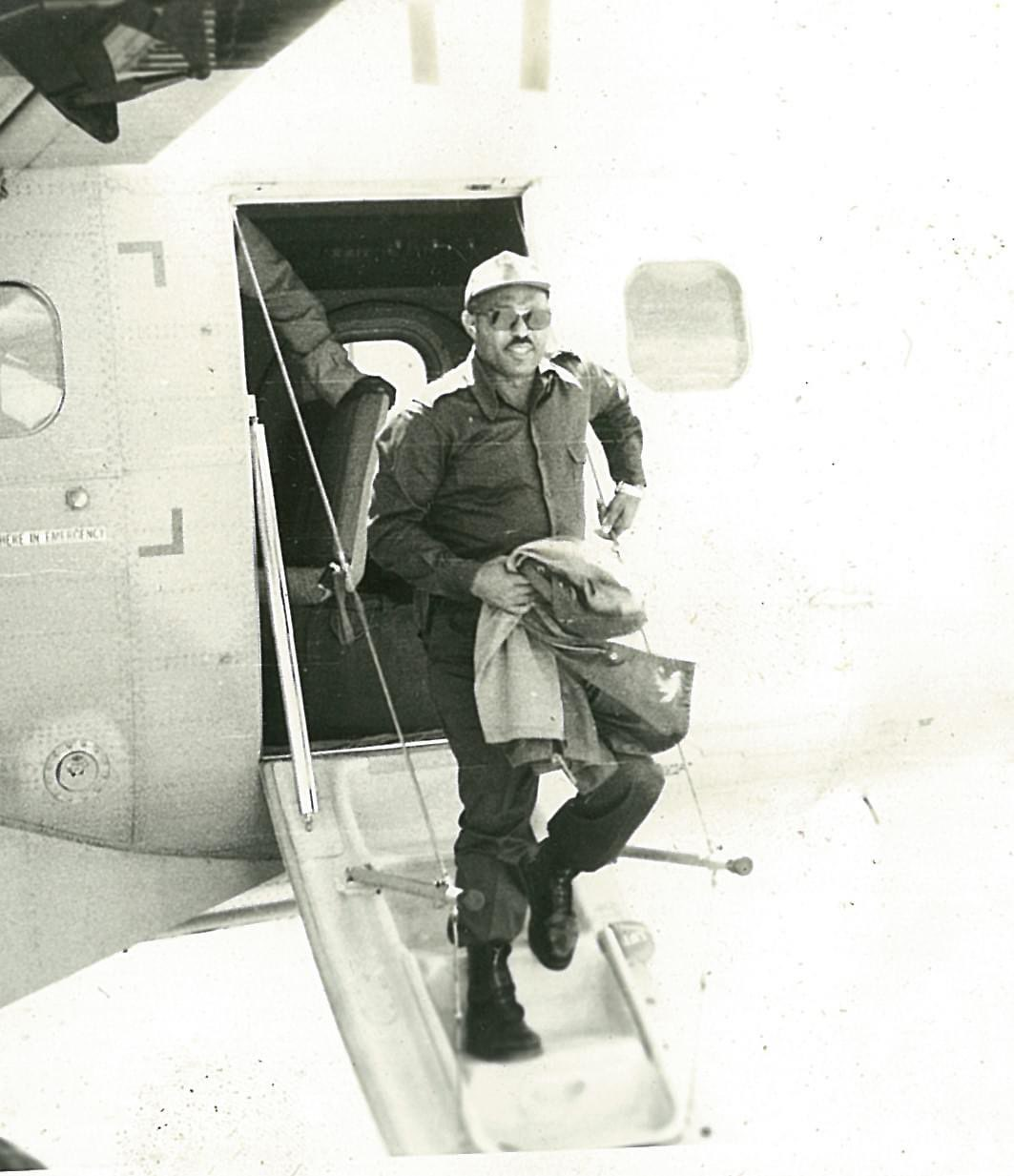
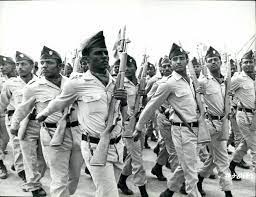
Date	August 28 1980 - December 3 1980
Location	Ogaden, Ethiopia
Result	Ethiopian victory
Territorial changes	Expulsion of Somali insurgents from Ethiopian territory

Commanders and leaders
Mengistu Haile Mariam; Merid Negussie; Demissie Bulto	Abdullahi Hassan Mahmoud; Yusuf Dheere Mohamed Sugaal; Wako Gutu

Operation Lash (Amharic: የላሽ ዘመቻ, romanized: lash zemecha) was a 1980 Ethiopian Army counter-insurgency campaign and operation against the Western Somali Liberation Front (WSLF) and the Somali Abo Liberation Front (SALF) aimed at eliminating Somali separatists from the Ogaden, specifically the Western Somali Liberation Front and the Somali Abo Liberation Front.

From August to December of 1980 the Ethiopian Army deployed 60,000 troops to the Ogaden to put an end to separatist insurgencies in a successful military operation that influenced counter-insurgency doctrine used in the Red Star Campaign.
