= Gode =

City in Somali Region, Ethiopia

Gode Suubaanbalal
- City
- Location within Ethiopia Location within the Horn of Africa Location within Africa
- Coordinates: 5.952655°N 43.551579°E
- Country: Ethiopia
- Region: Somali
- Zone: Gode Zone

Population (2025 (estimate))
  - Total: 102,463
  - Density: 4,454/km^{2} (11,540/sq mi)
- Time zone: UTC+3 (EAT)
- postal code: 3040
- Area code: +251

Gode (Amharic: ጎዴ)(Somali: Godey), is a city in the Somali Region of Ethiopia. Located in the Shabelle Zone, the city was the capital of the Somali Region until 1995 when Jijiga became the capital

Gode Airport, also known as the Ugas Mirad Airport (IATA code GDE), has regular flights operated by Ethiopian Airlines. A bridge over the Shebelle River was built near Gode in 1964.

== History ==
During the 1960s, the Ethiopian government undertook several development projects in Gode, including irrigation, infrastructure and irrigation projects. However, attacks by the Western Somali Liberation Front (WSLF) on French hydrologists resulted in the programme being scrapped.

Before the start of the Ogaden War, Gode was garrisoned by the 5th brigade of the 4th division of the Ethiopian Army, distributed around the town in five military camps. Gode was captured by the WSLF near the end of July 1977 during the Ogaden War, preceding subsequent Somoli advances toward Jijiga.

The initial assault began at 3:00, when two Somali National Army (SNA) armoured and three mechanised brigades under the command of Colonel Abdillahi Askar launched their attack in the Ogaden at the direction of the city of Gode. Despite the 5th Ethiopian Brigade's defence of the town coming with success in the coming days they suffered heavily from air raids and Somali artillery, and Gode was captured by the Somalis on July 25. Without artillery or air support to cover their retreat, the Ethiopian defenders were effectively annihilated, with two entire Ethiopian divisions destroyed and only 489 out of the 2,350 militiamen managing to return to Harar, the rest presumed dead. Abdillahi earned himself the nickname the 'Lion of Gode' for his success.

According to the historical notes of the Somali Army, Gode was liberated on July 24, 1977 by the regular Somali Army under the leadership of then General Abdullahi Ahmed Irro and his deputy Major Abdulkadir Koosaar.

Despite the end of the Ogaden War, the WSLF retained full control of the Gode region long after the Somali Army had systematically withdrawn from the Ogaden in March 1978. Ethiopian units under Brigadier-General Demisse Bulto, commander of the First Revolutionary Army, recaptured Gode during Operation Lash in November 1980. Ethiopian troops used the city as one of its three bases to successfully clear the rest of eastern Ethiopia of Somali guerrillas by 3 December.

Gode has been at the center of several recent famines: one in 1981; the next in 1991, which required the UN High Commission for Refugees to airlift food to 80,000 people stranded outside the town; and most recently in 2000, during which large numbr of displaced people arrived in Gode seeking food aid, reportedly increasing the towns population to around 100,000 inhabitants. The repeated famines and conflicts affecting Gode led journalist John Graham of the Addis Observer to describe the town as being associated with "famine and war."

A 2001 report published by the US Centers for Disease Control and Prevention noted that recurrent drought, food shortages, and displacement in the Gode district contributed to severe malnutrition and increased mortality during the 2000 famine.

In 1989, the Ethiopian government inaugurated the Melka Wakena Hydroelectric Power Station which was built by a Czechoslovak firm. The rise of plantations in the nearby Webi Shabelle valley also resulted in the town’s growth as sedentary farmers from other parts of Ethiopia settled within the town.

On 26 July 1994, the then-current mayor, Muktar Aden, Gedden was murdered. For several weeks afterward, it was not clear who was responsible, as no individual or group had taken responsibility or had been accused.

In February 2024, Ethiopian Airlines completed a new terminal building, aircraft parking apron, and taxiway project at Gode Ugaas Miraad Airport. The airline stated that the airport serves daily flights to and from Gode and provide a direct connection between Gode and Jijiga.

== Demographics ==
According to the 1997 national census, the city's total population was 857,755 of whom 428,019 were males and 429,736 were females. The ethnic breakdown was 99%. Gode is primarily inhabited by the Somalis (99%), and other ethnic groups make 1% of the population. Based on the 1997 National census, 110,044 inhabitants, were in school, of whom 57,766 were males and 52,278 were female. On the other hand, 35,478 people, or 77.5% of the overall population, were illiterate, of whom 17,273 were male and 18,205 female.

Based on 2010 figures from the Central Statistical Agency, Gode has an estimated total population of 950,782, of whom 488,235 were males and 442,089 were females. Gode is the largest town in the Gode woreda.

== Climate ==
Gode has a hot arid climate (Köppen BWh) with uniformly very hot weather and scanty, extremely variable rainfall. The average annual temperature in Gode is 28.8 °C or 83.8 °F, and virtually every afternoon exceeds 32 °C or 89.6 °F, while mornings seldom fall below 20 °C or 68 °F.

There are two short wet seasons in April–May and October–November which provide 291 millimetres or 11.46 inches of precipitation – about ninety percent of the mean annual rainfall of 325 millimetres or 12.80 inches. These wet seasons are caused by brief passages of the Intertropical Convergence Zone over the region; however, they are extremely erratic even for an arid region. The wettest calendar year between 1967 and 1999 was 1967 with 754.2 millimetres (29.69 in) of precipitation and the driest 1980 with 38.8 millimetres (1.53 in) of precipitation.

Climate data for Gode, elevation 295 m (968 ft)
Month	Jan	Feb	Mar	Apr	May	Jun	Jul	Aug	Sep	Oct	Nov	Dec	Year
Mean daily maximum °C (°F)	35.0 (95.0)	36.2 (97.2)	36.9 (98.4)	35.2 (95.4)	33.7 (92.7)	32.7 (90.9)	32.7 (90.9)	33.5 (92.3)	35.0 (95.0)	33.9 (93.0)	33.7 (92.7)	35.0 (95.0)	34.5 (94.0)
Daily mean °C (°F)	28.2 (82.8)	28.8 (83.8)	30.1 (86.2)	29.7 (85.5)	29.1 (84.4)	28.7 (83.7)	28.0 (82.4)	28.0 (82.4)	29.0 (84.2)	28.6 (83.5)	27.7 (81.9)	27.7 (81.9)	28.6 (83.6)
Mean daily minimum °C (°F)	21.1 (70.0)	22.0 (71.6)	23.7 (74.7)	23.7 (74.7)	22.7 (72.9)	22.3 (72.1)	22.5 (72.5)	23.0 (73.4)	23.2 (73.8)	22.2 (72.0)	21.0 (69.8)	21.1 (70.0)	22.4 (72.3)
Average precipitation mm (inches)	0 (0)	3 (0.1)	16 (0.6)	89 (3.5)	63 (2.5)	1 (0.0)	0 (0)	0 (0)	8 (0.3)	48 (1.9)	35 (1.4)	3 (0.1)	266 (10.4)
Average relative humidity (%)	47	46	48	54	63	59	55	54	51	63	56	48	54
Mean daily sunshine hours	9.6	9.9	9.6	10.5	9.9	9.7	9.7	11.0	10.5	8.4	9.2	7.7	9.6
Source 1: FAO
Source 2: Weather Atlas (sun hours)
