= Gode Airport =

Airport in Gode, Ethiopia

- IATA: GDE; ICAO: HAGO

Summary
- Airport type: Public
- Serves: Gode, Ethiopia
- Location: Gode
- Elevation AMSL: 830 ft (250 m)
- Coordinates: 5°56′07″N 43°34′43″E

Map
- Location of airport in Ethiopia

Runways
Direction	Length		Surface
Direction	ft	m	Surface
04/22	7,500	2,280	Asphalt
- Source: DAFIF database

Gode Airport, which is named Ugaas Mirad Ugaas Leyli Airport, (IATA: GDE, ICAO: HAGO) is a public airport in the city of Gode, in eastern Ethiopia. The airport is located at an elevation of 254 meters above sea level. Its only runway, with an asphalt surface, is 2,288 meters in length and 35 meters wide. It is named after former mayor of the town Ughaz Mirad.

Construction of the airport began in 1965 by the Swedish construction firm Skanska, and was formally inaugurated by Emperor Haile Selassie on 10 June 1966. Although originally a military air base, Gode Airport was afterwards also used for civil flights.

== Airlines and destinations ==
Airlines	Destinations
Ethiopian Airlines	Addis Ababa, Dire Dawa, Jijiga
