= Yusuf Tukeh =

Somali military leader

Colonel Tukeh Yusuf Abdi Ali Tukeh
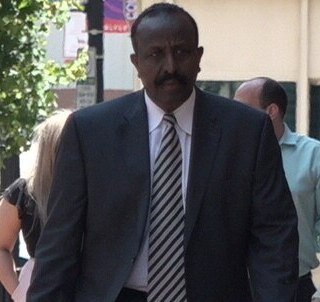
- Ali leaving a court hearing in Alexandria, Virginia in 2019
- Born: 1952 or 1953 (age 72–73)
- Military career
- Allegiance: Somali Democratic Republic
- Branch: Somali National Army
- Service years: c. May 1987–c. July 1988
- Rank: Lieutenant Colonel
- Commands: Fifth Brigade in Northwest Somalia
- Known for: Committing acts of torture during the Somali Civil War
- Conflicts: Somali Civil War Somali Rebellion: 1988 Hargeisa-Burao offensive; Battle of Burao
- Other work: Retired lieutenant colonel

Yusuf Abdi Ali Tukeh is a former Somali Colonel and head of the Somali National Army's Fifth Brigade, under the former Somali Democratic Republic. In 2019, a US jury found Ali guilty of committing acts of torture during Somalia's civil war in the late 1980s.

== Somali National Army ==
Colonel Tukeh served in the Somali National Army from 1987-1988 under former President Siad Barre. He particularly fought against clan based rebels belonging to the Isaaq clan, the Somali National Movement (SNM), in the northern regions of Somalia. Tukeh would later be trialed and found guilty for his war crimes during his time in the north. He participated in the 1988 Hargeisa-Burao offensive, and Battle of Burao, on the side of the Somali government. Where a pivotal member of the SNM, Mohamed Farah Dalmar Yusuf was killed in action by Somali Troops, and another SNM member, Ahmed Mire Mohamed wounded in action. Despite this controversy, Tukeh is renowned by many Somalis for his action’s against the SNM rebels and Ethiopia.

Tukeh currently resides in the city of Las Anod, where he was welcomed after being deported from the USA. Upon his arrival in Las Anod, he addressed a crowd of supporters, in which he said:”I am very glad to be here in Las anod today. I want to thank those who have supported me over the past 32 years. I am happy to die today, because I am in a free Las Anod with its strong army.”

== War crimes ==
In 2019, he was found guilty by torturing a teenager named Farhan back in 1987 and had to pay damages for the crime. In 2022, Ali was arrested by in Springfield, Virginia regarding his war crimes including extrajudicial killing; torture; cruel, inhuman, or degrading treatment or punishment; and arbitrary detention. He was accused of multiple human rights violations during the 1980s. He was arrested in Virginia and was taken into custody in November 2022. He returned to his birth country of Somalia on December 20, 2024.

== See also ==
- Somali National Army
- Somali Democratic Republic
- Mohammed Hashi Gani
- Siad Barre
