= Battle of Harar =

1977–1978 conflict in Ethiopia; part of Ogaden War

- Part of Ogaden War
Date	October 1977 – 27 January 1978
Location	Hararghe, Ethiopia
Result	Ethiopian victory

Belligerents
Ethiopia; Cuba; South Yemen	Somalia; WSLF

Strength
30,000 soldiers (Cuba) 3,000 soldiers	(Somalia) 20,000 soldiers

Casualties and losses
	3,000 casualties 15 tanks captured many APCs captured 28 artillery pieces captured

The Battle of Harar was a battle of the Ogaden War. The battle took place from October 1977 until January 1978, and was fought near Harar, Ethiopia. The Cuban soldiers took part supporting the Ethiopian army, during the battle they engaged the attackers in vicious fighting.

== Battle ==
The Somalis executed a pincer strategy, advancing from the north towards Dire Dawa and simultaneously from the east towards Harar. Their primary objective seemed to be capturing Harar initially and subsequently joining forces with the northern contingent in Dire Dawa. Consequently, their focus was on breaking through the eastern front line, pushing forward from Karamara and Fik. Despite the Ethiopian defense line's challenging position, it took the Somali army over seven weeks to breakthrough it. The highland population, especially the settlers, strongly opposed the Somalis and supported the Ethiopian men in uniform in every conceivable way, from scouting to guarding strategic crossroads. As the Somalis moved deeper into unfriendly areas, their overstretched lines grew more vulnerable to disruption.

The Somali army aimed to encircle and eliminate a substantial Ethiopian detachment holding a protruding position stretching from Harar to the southeast in Kore. They assembled a formidable force for this mission, potentially consisting of up to five motorized infantry brigades, a tank brigade, an artillery brigade, a commando brigade, and at least two guerrilla brigades. This assault was repelled by the Fourth Artillery Battalion and the Seventy-fourth Militia Brigade.

With their efforts at Kore thwarted, the Somalis switched their attention to Kombolcha, Babile and Fedis and began striking at the weakest point. On November 16, the Somalis launched a massive artillery bombardment on Jarso, causing panic among the defenders. A portion of the Ethiopian contingent fled to Kombolcha and Harar, while some stayed behind to destroy valuable equipment before regrouping at Mt. Hablo, just a kilometer from town. Ethiopian reinforcements en route were ambushed by the Somalis and suffered heavy losses on the eighteenth, losing two truckloads of supplies and two 105 mm guns to the advancing Somalis, who quickly approached Kombolcha, situated sixteen kilometers northwest of Harar.

The Ethiopian forces in Kombolcha, consisting of units that had retreated from Jarso along with fresh supporting elements, engaged in a brief battle on November 24 before retreating towards Harar, Alemaya, and Hameresa, leaving Kombolcha vulnerable. However, the town was saved by a determined unit with the support of the First Paracommando Brigade (FPB), dispatched from Shashamene under the command of Lieutenant Colonel Tesfaye Habte Mariam, effectively blocking the enemy's entry into Kombolcha.

On November 18, the Somalis faced an attack on the Jaldessa fronts, resulting in the loss of a significant amount of heavy and light weaponry. Their counterattack five days later saw them regain some territory, but the Ethiopian forces successfully repelled them. They made another attempt at the end of the month, resulting in the loss of 150 soldiers, 19 PRGs, and 120 Kalashnikov assault rifles. This setback temporarily silenced their artillery, allowing the Ethiopians to conduct air strikes on border towns in northern Somalia.

The counteroffensive was preceded by a Somali attempt to seize Harar on January 22. The Somalis began by blasting the town of Babile with mortars and rockets. Starting with an intense bombardment of Babile from Hill 1692, they aimed to divert Ethiopian attention. At 15:30 hours, multiple Somali infantry brigades, supported by tanks and artillery, advanced towards Harar from Fedis, seeking to dislodge the SPB from Mt. Hakim. Simultaneously, another force attacked from Ejersa Gore to neutralize the Ethiopian troops at Kombolcha and cut off those at Kore from the rear.

The Ethiopians and the Somalis engaged in a continuous battle lasting six hours with minimal interruptions. Ali Berke Tucho, an Ethiopian militiaman, boosted the morale of his unit by infiltrating and eliminating three Somali tanks. This achievement, as reported, instilled confusion among the Somali ranks and by 14:00 hours the Somalis halted their attack.

This operation, executed with significant force, came too late to turn the tide. In a coordinated ground and air resistance, which involved Cuban soldiers for the first time, the Ethiopians counterattacked the Somalis a few kilometers from the city. As tank battles raged on the ground, jet fighter bombers targeted the enemy's rear and disrupted their communication lines. The Somalis suffered a significant defeat, with casualties potentially exceeding three thousand, marking their largest single-action loss since the conflict's onset six months earlier. Their plan to encircle and capture the provincial heart was entirely thwarted.

This event marked a turning point in the war, prompting the Ethiopians to transition from defense to offense. During counterattacks from January 23 to 27, the Eleventh Division and Cuban armoured brigades reclaimed territory up to Fedis, the first significant town liberated. In the process, they seized numerous tanks, APCs, artillery, anti-aircraft guns, infantry weapons, and munitions depots. Subsequently, the Somalis were forced to abandon most of the territory they had occupied.

== See also ==
- Battle of Jijiga
