= Abdillahi Askar =

Colonel of the Somali National Movement

Colonel Mujahid Abdillahi Askar Barkhad
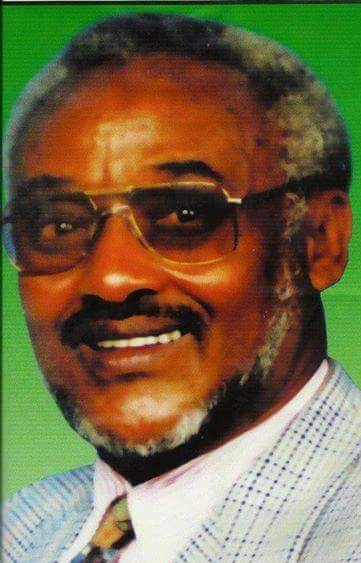

Personal details
- Born: 1947 (age 78–79) Dire Dawa, Ethiopia
- Died: 29 August 2010 (aged 62–63) Hargeisa, Somaliland
- Resting place: Sheikh Muse Dualeh Cemetery; Hargeisa
- Party: Somali National Movement

Military service
- Allegiance: Somali Democratic Republic (1967-1981); Somali National Movement (1981-1991); Somaliland (1991-2010)
- Branch/service: Somali National Army
- Years of service: 1967 – 1991
- Rank: Colonel
- Battles/wars: Ogaden War; Somaliland War of Independence

Colonel Abdillahi Askar (Somali: Cabdillaahi Askar Barkhad; 1947 – 29 August 2010) was a Somali military officer and colonel of the Somali National Movement (SNM). Nicknamed the 'Lion of Gode' after annihilating two Ethiopian divisions in the Ogaden war, he joined the SNM shortly after its foundation.

== Biography ==
Relation map.
Ad=Addis Ababa, Aw=Aware, Di=Dire Dawa, Ga=Gashamo, Ha=Hargeisa

Abdillahi Askar was born in 1947 in Dire Dawa, Ethiopia. He completed his intermediate education in Dire Dawa and returned to Somaliland in 1966. In 1967, he enlisted in the Somali Armed Forces and trained as an officer in the Soviet Union. After some time, he pursued higher education in military leadership and training in the United States.

== Career ==
=== Ogaden War ===
In July 1977 the Democratic Republic of Somalia launched an invasion of Ethiopia, in support of the Western Somali Liberation Front (WSLF) insurgency, triggering a broader inter-state war, with the goal of uniting all of the Somali-inhabited territories in the Horn of Africa into a Greater Somalia (Soomaaliweyn).

The initial assault began at 3:00, when two SNA armoured and three mechanised brigades under the command of Abdillahi launched their attack in the Ogaden at the direction of the city of Godey. Despite the 5th Ethiopian Brigade's defence of the town coming with success in the coming days they suffered heavily from air raids and Somali artillery, and Gode was captured by the Somalis on July 25. Without artillery or air support to cover their retreat, the Ethiopian defenders were effectively annihilated, with two entire Ethiopian divisions destroyed and only 489 out of the 2,350 militiamen managing to return to Harar, the rest presumed dead. After this immense victory at the Battle of Godey, Abdillahi earned himself the nickname;the 'Lion of Gode' for his success.

=== Establishment of SNM ===
In 1981, the Somali National Movement (SNM) was founded in London, England, with the goal of opposing the Somali dictatorship.

Shortly after the establishment of the SNM, SNM military bases were created in Gashamo and Aware, and Askar became commander of one of the bases in the Aware area. The deputy commander was Dayib Gurey.

=== Operation Birjeex ===
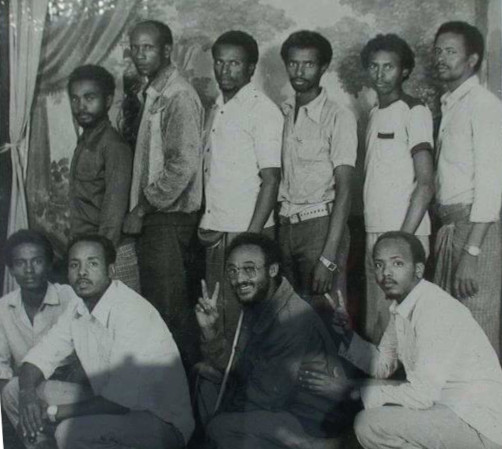
Commemorative photo after the rescue. Abdillahi Askar is in the center of the front row.

In December 1982, the SNM sent Abdisalan Turki and Abdillahi Askar from Gashamo in eastern Ethiopia to Hargeisa. In April 1983, Abdillahi Askar arrived in Hargeisa. On April 8 he was arrested in an old movie theater.

Eleven people belonging to the SNM were to rescue Abdillahi Askar. This was later dubbed Operation Birjeex. The SNM team led by Ibrahim Ismail Koodbur rescued him with two casualties.

=== SNM's counterattack ===
In November 1984, the SNM invaded the former British Somaliland by dividing its forces into three units: western, central, and eastern, with Askar leading the western unit. The western contingent lost 347 of its 383 men killed; the SNM as a whole lost the war this time.

On May 31, 1988, the SNM again invaded Somaliland, and Abdillahi occupied Hargeisa as one of the SNM's Colonels.

=== Death and legacy ===
After Somaliland regained independence Abdillahi served as Somaliland's liaison officer in Addis Ababa, Ethiopia. On August 29, 2010, he died in Hargeisa. The funeral of the deceased was attended by the President of Somaliland and hundreds of Somalilanders.

Later, the Abdillahi Askar Military Academy, named after him, was established in Dararweyne (east of Hargaysa) and graduated its first class in 2020.
