= Battle of Burao =

Battle between the Somali regime and the Somali National Movement (SNA)

- Part of 1988 Hargeisa-Burao offensive of the Somaliland War of Independence
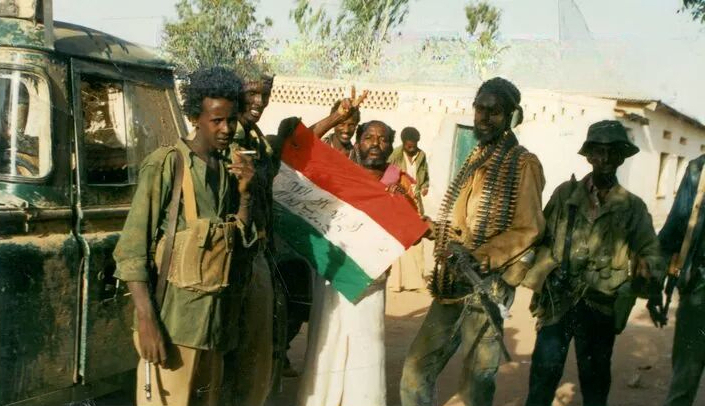
- SNM fighters shortly after capturing Burao, 27 May 1988
Date	27 May 1988
Location	Burao, Togdheer, Somaliland
Result	SNM victory
Territorial changes	SNM forces overran the city within 2 hours

Belligerents
Somali National Movement	Somali Democratic Republic

Commanders and leaders
Ahmed Mire (WIA); Colonel Handulleh; Mohamed Ali †	Yusuf Abdi Ali "Tukeh"

Strength
1,200	Unknown

Casualties and losses
City destroyed via aerial bombardment	Heavy

The Battle of Burao took place on 27 May 1988 during the Somaliland War of Independence, when forces of the Somali National Movement (SNM) launched a surprise attack on the city of Burao, a strategic location in central Somaliland.

== Background ==
In the late 1980s, growing discontent with the regime of President Siad Barre, particularly among the Isaaq clan, led to increased support for the SNM. Seeking autonomy for the northern regions, the SNM initiated a series of offensives against government forces.

== The Battle ==
On 27 May 1988, SNM forces, led by Col. Ahmed Mire Mohamed, commenced an assault on Burao. The attack was notable for its surprise element, with SNM fighters infiltrating the city under the cover of darkness. The operation began with evening prayers at Baliga Samatar Ahmed, where Col. Ahmed Mire addressed his troops, emphasizing the significance of their mission.

The SNM fighters, including both men and women, advanced from Baliga Samatar Ahmed towards Burao. Despite encountering initial resistance from government forces, they managed to penetrate the city's defenses. The surprise and determination of the SNM forces led to the swift capture of key installations within the city.

== Aftermath ==
The capture of Burao by SNM forces was a significant milestone in the Somaliland War of Independence, It demonstrated the capability and resolve of the SNM to challenge the Somali government's authority in the northern regions. However, the battle also resulted in substantial destruction and civilian displacement, as government forces launched counter-offensives to retake the city. The events in Burao, along with similar attacks in other northern cities, intensified the conflict and galvanized support for the SNM's cause.

== Legacy ==
The Battle of Burao is remembered as a turning point in the struggle for Somaliland's independence, It highlighted the effectiveness of the SNM's guerrilla tactics and their ability to mobilize local support. The battle also exposed the vulnerabilities of the Somali government's military apparatus in the northern regions. The events of 27 May 1988 are commemorated annually in Somaliland as a symbol of resistance and the quest for self-determination.
