= Battle of Jijiga =

1977–78 battle between Somalia and Ethiopia

- Part of Ogaden War
Date	September 1977 – 5 March 1978
Location	Jijiga, Ethiopia
Result	Somali victory (September 1977-February 1978); Ethiopian-Allied victory (March 1978)

Belligerents
Ethiopia; Cuba; Soviet Union; South Yemen	Somalia; WSLF

Strength
1977: 25,000 soldiers 108 tanks, mostly M47s and M41s	1977: unknown soldiers 124 tanks, mostly T-54/55; 1978: 30,000 soldiers 30,000 militias

Casualties and losses
1977: Ethiopia: 43 tanks destroyed 28 APCs; 1978: Cuba: 6 T-62 destroyed 8 T-62 damaged	

The Battle of Jijiga was a series of battles that was part of the Ogaden War. The battles were fought in Jijiga, Ethiopia and was one the largest battles of the conflict. Following the capture of Jigjiga, Paul B Henze concluded that the Somali offensive into the Ogaden was one of the most skillful military operations the world had seen in years. On August 27 the elite Ethiopian 3rd division fled and abandoned Mengistu leaving him almost captured in which he had to be airlifted to Harar.

== History ==
=== First Battle of Jijiga (September 1977) ===
In mid-September 1977, during the Somali invasion of the Ethiopian Somali region, Somalia National Army forces attacked the Ethiopian held garrison in Jijiga. By September more than 90% of Somali Region was in SNA control and on September 12 the Somalia forces captured Jijiga, a strategic success. Jijiga overlooked the nearby Marda Pass where Ethiopian troops were entrenched, halting any further Somali advance deeper.

Local defenders at Jijiga garrison consisted of roughly 25,000 Ethiopian infantrymen. The SNA attack on Jijiga came the same day Dire Dawa came under siege.

The Ethiopian army had begun to receive Soviet aid by the time of the battle, however morale was low and when a British journalist visited the battlefield afterwards, he claimed that large quantities of weapons had been abandoned by fleeing Ethiopian forces.

124 Somali tanks, mostly T-55s, defeated 108 Ethiopian tanks, mainly M47 Pattons and M41 Walker Bulldogs. The Ethiopians lost 43 tanks during the battle, including 11 T-34/85 and 32 US made tanks as well as 28 Armoured personnel carriers.

Parts of the battle, including the massacre of both Jijiga's Somali population by the Ethiopian Army and the Somali army's shelling and sniping of refugees attempting to flee the city, are described by Nega Mezlekia in his autobiographical book, Notes from the Hyena's Belly.

=== Second Battle of Jijiga (March 1978) ===
After the Somali advance on Harar had been turned back at the Battle of Harar, the Ethiopian forces launched a counter-attack against the Somali Army (starting on January 22, 1978) with the help of Cuban forces. The Ethiopian forces outflanked the Somali forces and inflicted major losses on them. On March 5, 1978 the Ethiopians recaptured Jijiga and on March 9, 1978, Somalia's President, Siad Barre announced that all Somali forces would leave the Somali Region of Ethiopia, ending the war.
