= SNM =

SNM may refer to:

- Sacred Name movement
- San Marino, UNDP country code
- Sant Nirankari Mission
- Scottish National Movement
- ShaMaran Petroleum (stock ticker symbol)
- Slovak National Museum
- Somali National Movement
- Special nuclear material

== See also ==
- S&M
