= Demissie Bulto =

Biography of a top military leader of Ethiopia

General Demissie Bulto (Amharic: ደምሴ ቡልቶ) was a highly decorated officer and commander of the First Army during the Somalian-Ethiopia war of the 1970s. He is described as "an officer with a well merited reputation for strategic vision, integrity, discipline, and decisiveness."

== Life ==
After graduating from the Royal Guard Military Academy of King Haileselassie, Demissie served in Korea during the Korean War as part of the UN mission.

Demissie attended the Infantry Leadership Course at Fort Benning Georgia, was among the first airborne officers trained in Israel and subsequently graduated from the US Army Staff and Command College at Fort Leavenworth, Kansas.

In 1968, he was identified by the US embassy in Ethiopia as a "highly decorated airborne officer" with "potential to rise to the very top of the Ethiopian Army."

In may 1989 General Demissie, then stationed in Asmara as commander of the Second Army, played a key role in the 1989 Ethiopian coup attempt to overthrow Ethiopia's brutal dictator Mengistu Hailemariam. General Demissie was killed after three days of leading the effort to overthrow Mengistu.
