= Somali National Army =

- Ciidanka Xooga Dalka Soomaaliyeed (CXDS) الجيش الوطني الصومالي
- Founded: 12 April 1960; 66 years ago
- Country: Somalia
- Part of: Somali Armed Forces
- Garrison/HQ: Taliska Ciidanka Xooga Dalka Soomaaliyeed
- Motto: Isku Tiirsada (Lean on each other)
- Colors: Green; Red (piping)
- Anniversaries: 12 April (Armed Forces Day)
- Engagements: 1961 revolt in Somalia; Shifta War; 1964 Ethiopian–Somali War; 1969 Somali coup d'état; 1977-78 Ogaden War; Invasion of Ogaden; Battle of Jijiga; Battle of Godey; 1978 coup attempt; 1982 Ethiopian–Somali War; Burco-Duuray offensive; Battle of Burao; Battle of Hargeisa (1988); Somali Civil War; Operation Indian Ocean; Las Anod conflict; Jubaland crisis; 2025 Shabelle offensive

Commanders
- President of Somalia: Hassan Sheikh Mohamud
- Minister of Defence: Ahmed Moalim Fiqi
- Chief of Defence: Brigadier General Ibrahim Mohamed Mohamud

Insignia
- Flag of the Somali Army

The Somali National Army (Somali: Ciidanka Xooga Dalka Soomaaliyeed, lit. 'Somali Ground Forces') are the ground forces component of the Somali Armed Forces.

Established in 1960 following the independence of the Somali Republic, the Somali National Army began as a small force of roughly 2,000 troops. It steadily grew over the course of the 1960s in response to the military threat from the Ethiopian Empire and had its first major conflict during the 1964 Ethiopian–Somali War. In the years following the SNA rapidly expanded its capacity to become one of Africa's most powerful military forces, with the assistance of the Soviet Union.

During the 1969 coup d'état SNA officers seized power and the army became increasingly involved in domestic politics. The following decade was the height of the SNA, and in 1977 it carried out the Ogaden War in support of the Western Somali Liberation Front against Ethiopia. The war eventually resulted in defeat for the SNA/WSLF coalition after a massive joint Soviet-Cuban military intervention. The post-war years saw the SNA progressively decline.

The cumulative effects of the 1982-83 Ethiopian invasion, the Somali Rebellion and the rapidly deteriorating economic situation in Somalia had stretched the SNA to its breaking point by the late 1980s. Mass desertions and mutinies became common place as the army unraveled while clan based rebel groups proliferated as the Somali Civil War gained momentum. Early in 1991 the army collapsed along with the Somali Democratic Republic.

In 2000, the SNA began the process of being slowly reconstituted under the Transitional National Government and later the Transitional Federal Government (TFG). These attempts repeatedly failed during the early-to-mid 2000s as the army was unable to survive without massive foreign military support due to rampant corruption, serious deficiencies in the quality of troops, poor leadership, weak logistical capacity and the absence of a chain of command. More than 80% of the army deserted towards the end of the 2006–2009 Ethiopian-Somali War.

The present iteration of the Somali National Army stems from the late 2008 peace agreement between the ascendant insurgent opposition of the Alliance for the Re-Liberation of Somalia (ARS) and the TFG. It was only during the 2010s under the Federal Government of Somalia that the SNA succeeded in starting to reconstitute military formations resembling its pre-1991 state. Today the SNA is primarily a light infantry force focused on counter-insurgency operations against the Al-Qaeda affiliate Al-Shabaab.

== History ==
=== Origins ===
Following independence, the SNA was created by merging police units in the former trusteeship with the northern Somaliland Scouts from the former British protectorate. Combined, both forces totalled around 1,800 to 2,000 men.

=== 1960s ===
Most of the SNA's weaponry was World War II in origin. The Soviet Union, Egypt, the United Kingdom and Italy were the primary sources of military equipment during the army's early years. By 1962 the SNA possessed a total of five tanks, all of which were the British made Comet. Other vehicles included six Ferret armoured car and eighteen Universal Carriers.

The SNA took part in civic action in times of natural disaster, such as floods in 1961 and famine in 1965. Army vehicles transported food and medical supplies to stricken areas.

During the early 1960s, the newly independent Somali Republic and the Ethiopian Empire under Haile Selasie came on the verge of full-scale war over the Ogaden issue, particularly during 1961 and 1964. In the years following there had been a number of reported and unreported skirmishes between Ethiopian and Somali troops.

==== 1964 War ====
In 1964, four years after its formation, the SNA faced its first major test in a short war with the Ethiopian Empire. The conflict was preceded by the Nasrallah insurgency in the Ogaden that began in mid-1963. Though the newly formed Somali government and army was weak, it had felt pressured and obliged to respond to what Somali citizens widely perceived as oppression of its brethren by an Ethiopian military occupation.

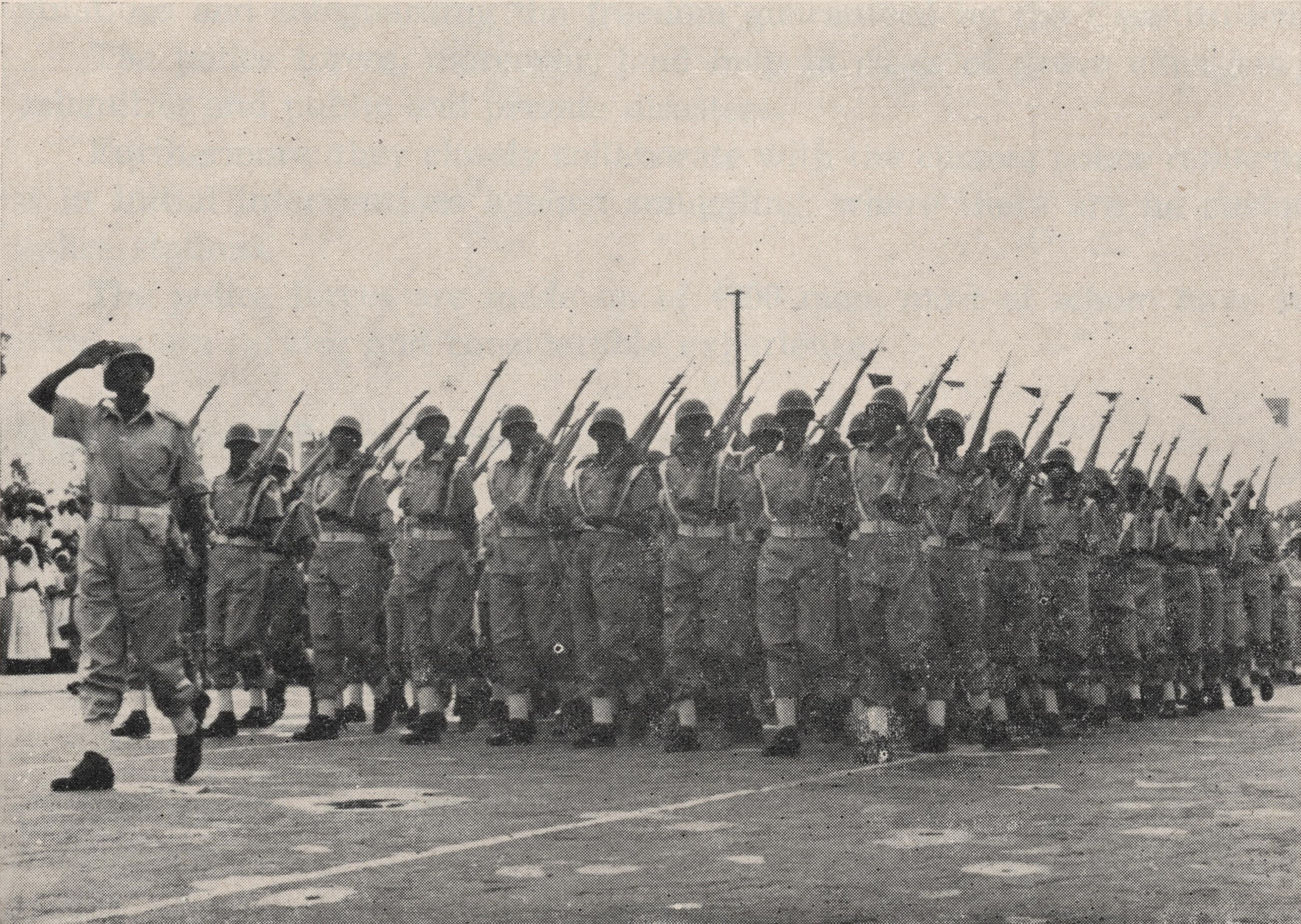
Somali National Army troops on parade (1963)

Sporadic border skirmishes in late 1963 grew into sustained fighting by early 1964, and on 8 February regular army units clashed along the northern border. The conflict spread across the entire 900-km Ethiopian-Somali frontier. After diplomatic negotiations in Khartoum at the request of African heads of state, the war concluded in early April 1964. The SNA, supported by the well trained national police force, was seen as able to withstand the pressure from Ethiopia's larger and better equipped military during the war. In the years after the war the SNA was viewed by the Somali citizens in "idealized terms".

The 1964 war increased the Somali government's emphasis on national security and military affairs in the ensuing years. American military support to Ethiopia during the war drove the Somali government to rely on the Soviet Union to build up the SNA post-war.

By the end of the 1960s the SNA was about 10,000 strong.

==== 1969 Coup ====
A leaflet declaring the October 1969 Revolution, depicting a pledge of allegiance over the helmet and rifle of the Somali National Army, before the Qur’an (1969)

On 21 October 1969 officers of the Somali National Army, led by General Siad Barre, overthrew the Somali Youth League government of the Somali Republic. A military junta named the Supreme Revolutionary Council (SRC) was formed, General Siad became President of Somalia and the country was renamed to the Somali Democratic Republic.

The army assumed a central political role and SNA officers of the SRC were installed to run Somalia's ministerial and administrative posts.

=== 1970s ===
Following the 1969 coup d'état the rank and file of the army became increasingly involved in civic action programs such as sand dune stabilization, road construction and refugee resettlement. Much of the SNA officer corps in this period trained in the Soviet Union.

At the start of the 1970s, the Somali National Army was around 10,000 men strong and possessed 150 tanks, most being Soviet T-34's. By 1975 this figure had risen to 250 tanks and 300 armored personnel carriers. The year prior to the Ogaden War of 1977-78 the army had approximately 22,000 personnel within a force composed of 6 tank battalions, 9 mechanised infantry battalions, 5 infantry battalions, 2 commando battalions, and 11 artillery battalions (5 of which were anti-aircraft).

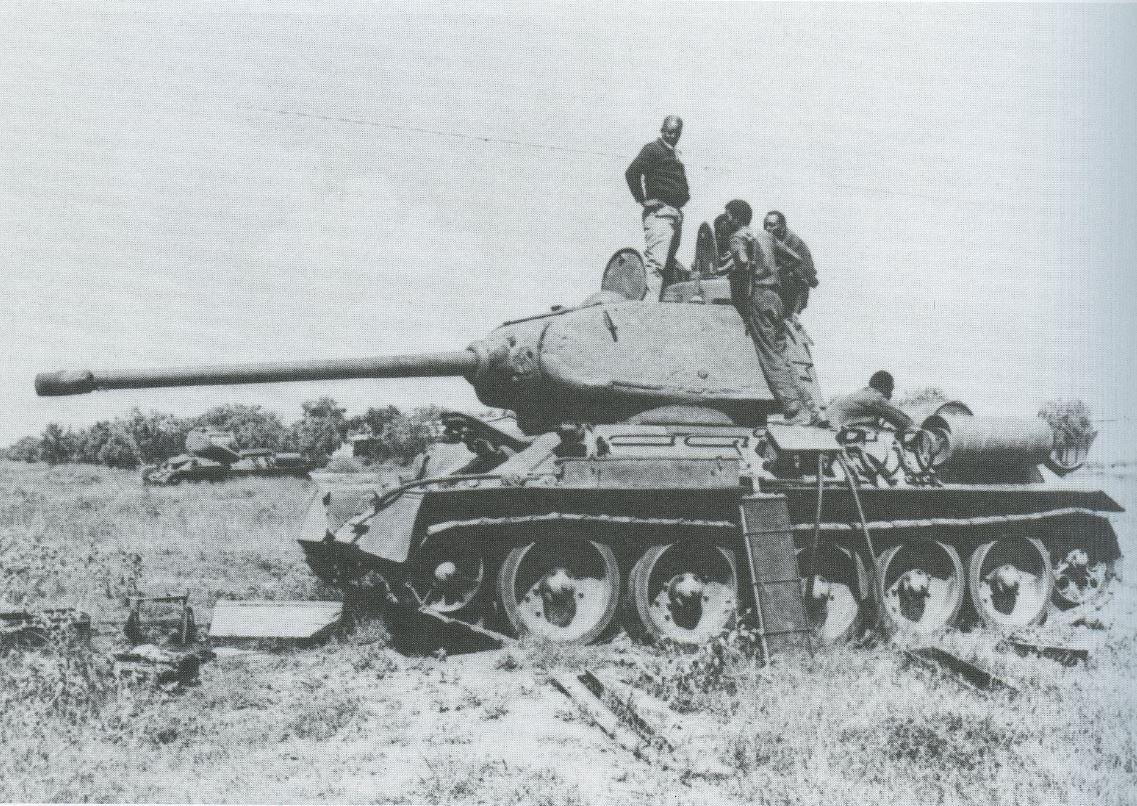
Damaged SNA T-34 tank undergoing repairs during the Ogaden War

Following the end of the Ogaden War and coup attempt in early 1978, the state of the SNA began to decline.

=== 1980s ===
The 1982 Ethiopian–Somali Border War occurred while the SNA severely under-equipped and ill-prepared for conflict following serious equipment losses incurred at the end of the Ogaden War. A coalition of Ethiopian troops and rebels of the Somali Salvation Democratic Front (SSDF) launched an invasion on 30 June 1982. Despite coming under heavy ground and air assaults, the SNA garrisons on the frontier inflicted heavy losses on the invaders and prevented the Ethiopians from capturing a vital roadway connecting north and south Somalia. Soon after a stalemate ensued. To the surprise of observers, the 1982 invasion was repulsed by the SNA. In spite of losses taken four years earlier, the army had regrouped and the Ethiopian attack led to a large increase in volunteers joining the army.

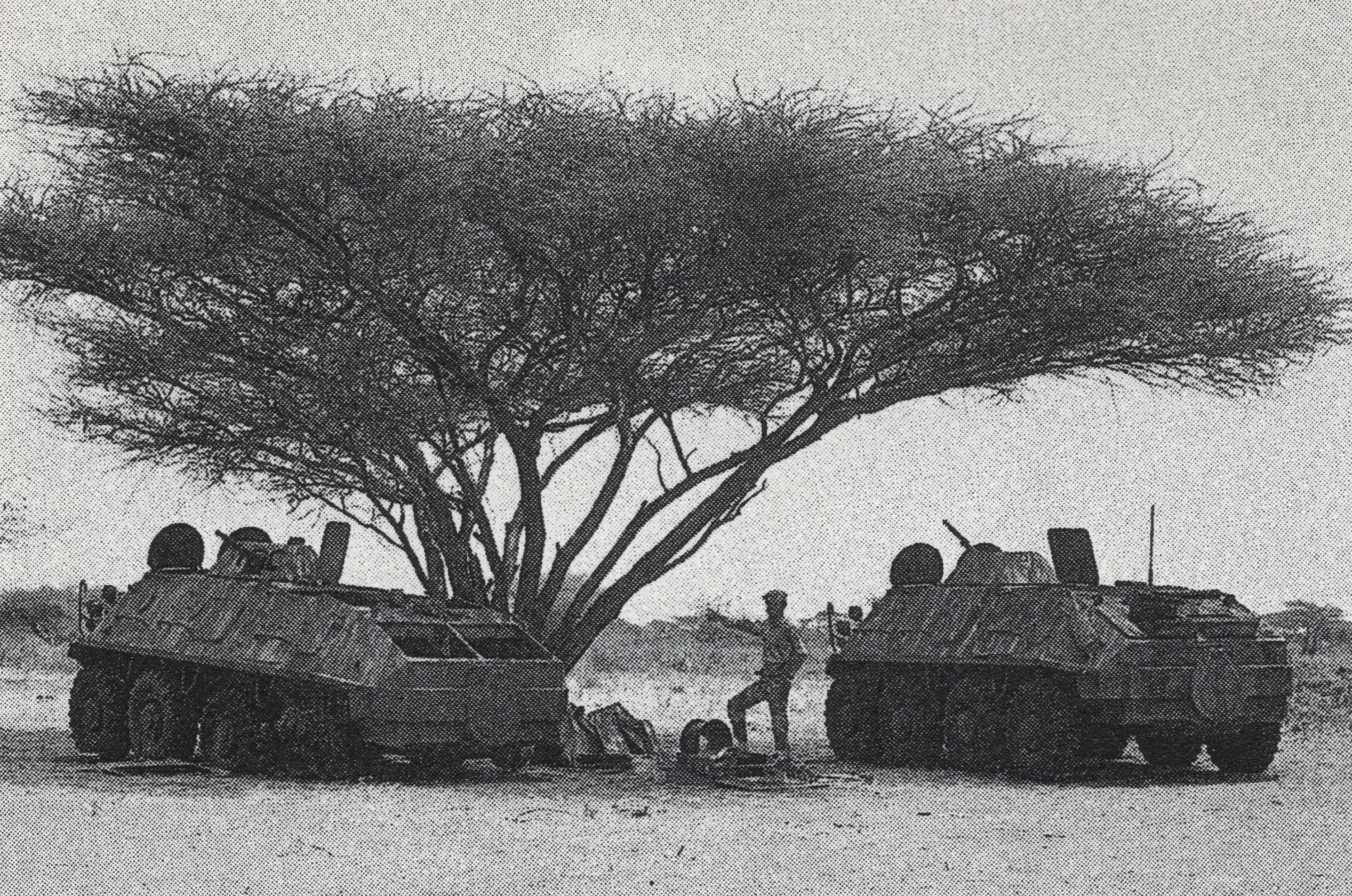
A Somali army soldier points at two captured Ethiopian BTR-60 armored personnel carriers that were disabled on the battlefields near Balambale and Guldogob (1982)

During the 1982 fighting with the Ethiopians, the Somali army started experiencing significant ammunition and communications equipment shortages, all the while lacking both anti-tank and anti-aircraft weaponry. The United States began arming the Somali army with "defensive arms" by the end of 1982. Anti-tank and anti-air equipment, along with some tanks (M47 Pattons) were provided to the SNA by the Americans. Joint exercises were held with the US military the following year.

Over the 1980s the SNA became increasingly politicized and the effectiveness of the officer corps was hampered by promotions being given on a clan basis by the ruling elite rather than on a meritocratic one. By 1987 the armed forces as a whole had started the process of disintegration. Many soldiers in the army had strong reservations about the war raging against the SNM in northern Somalia, officers from clans in the south began to desert the military.

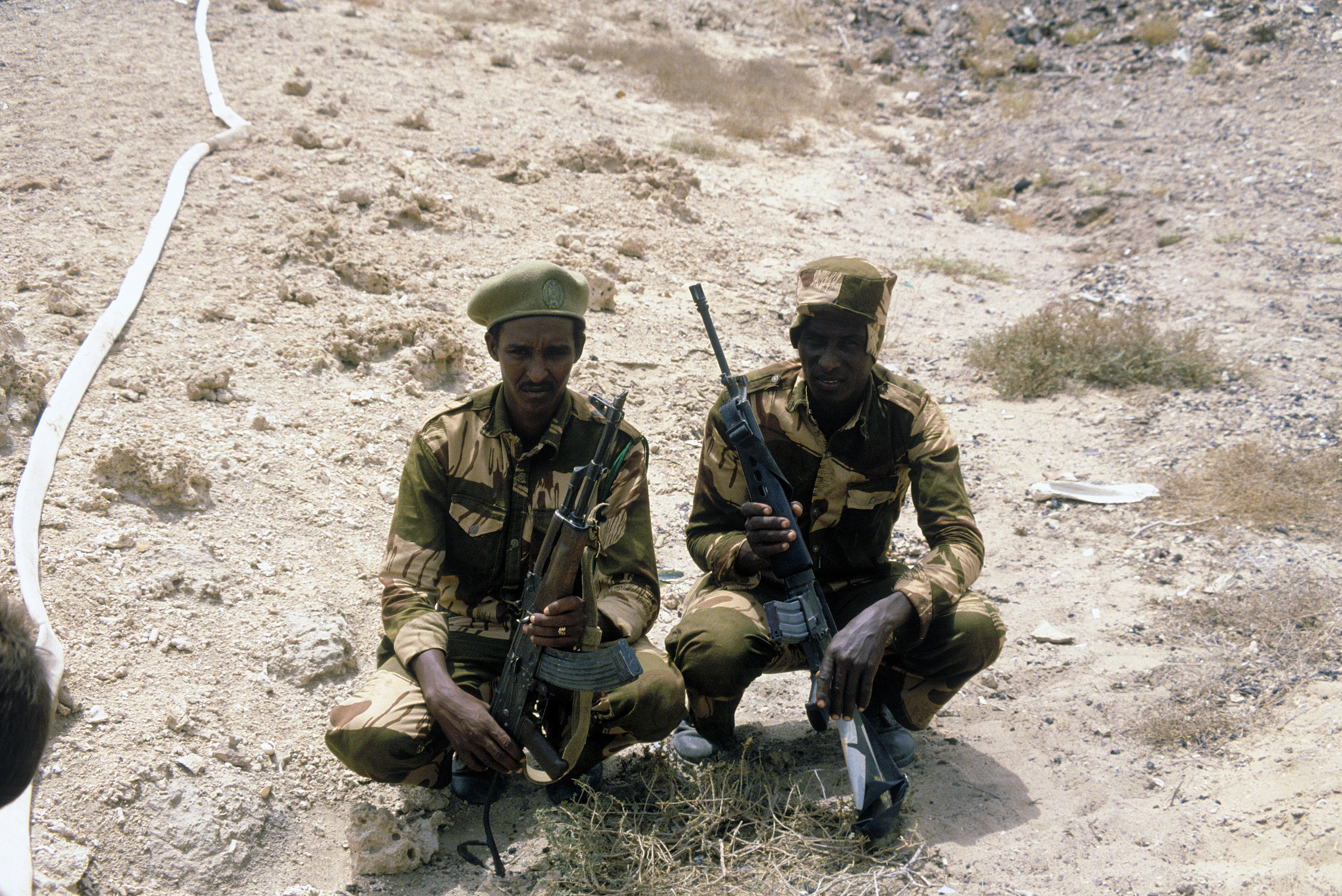
Two Somali National Army soldiers posing with an AK-47 and M16A1 during Operation Bright Star (1983)

During the late 1980s, the Somali army stocks suffered serious shortages of ammunition and the morale of various military formations reached a low. A 1989 strategic survey observed, "...morale has been reported to be low for lack of such vital items as ammunition and boots". Thus the SNA was also increasingly beset with mutinies of soldiers. After the hundreds were killed during the eruption of violence in Mogadishu during July 1989, mutinies occurred in Galkayo and Beledweyne over the following weeks. Mutineers in Galkayo briefly captured the city during November 1989 and seized significant quantities of military equipment from the local army division and destroyed it. Fighting escalated between the SNA and Somali Patriotic Movement (SPM) in the south throughout the fall of 1989.

By the end of 1989 new rebel groups were carrying out attacks in southern Somalia as the government was desperately seeking foreign military aid to remedy the SNA's supply situation, with little success. Particularly in the northern Somalia, the supply situation for SNA troops deployed in the strategic port of Berbera and other localities became dire by the end of the year as Somali National Movement (SNM) rebels began cutting key roads. Army supplies heading to north which managed to escape rebel attacks were usually requisitioned by SNA troops along the route further to the south. Attempts to clear these vital logistical links of rebel forces repeatedly faltered as the Somali military began to unravel.

=== 1990s ===
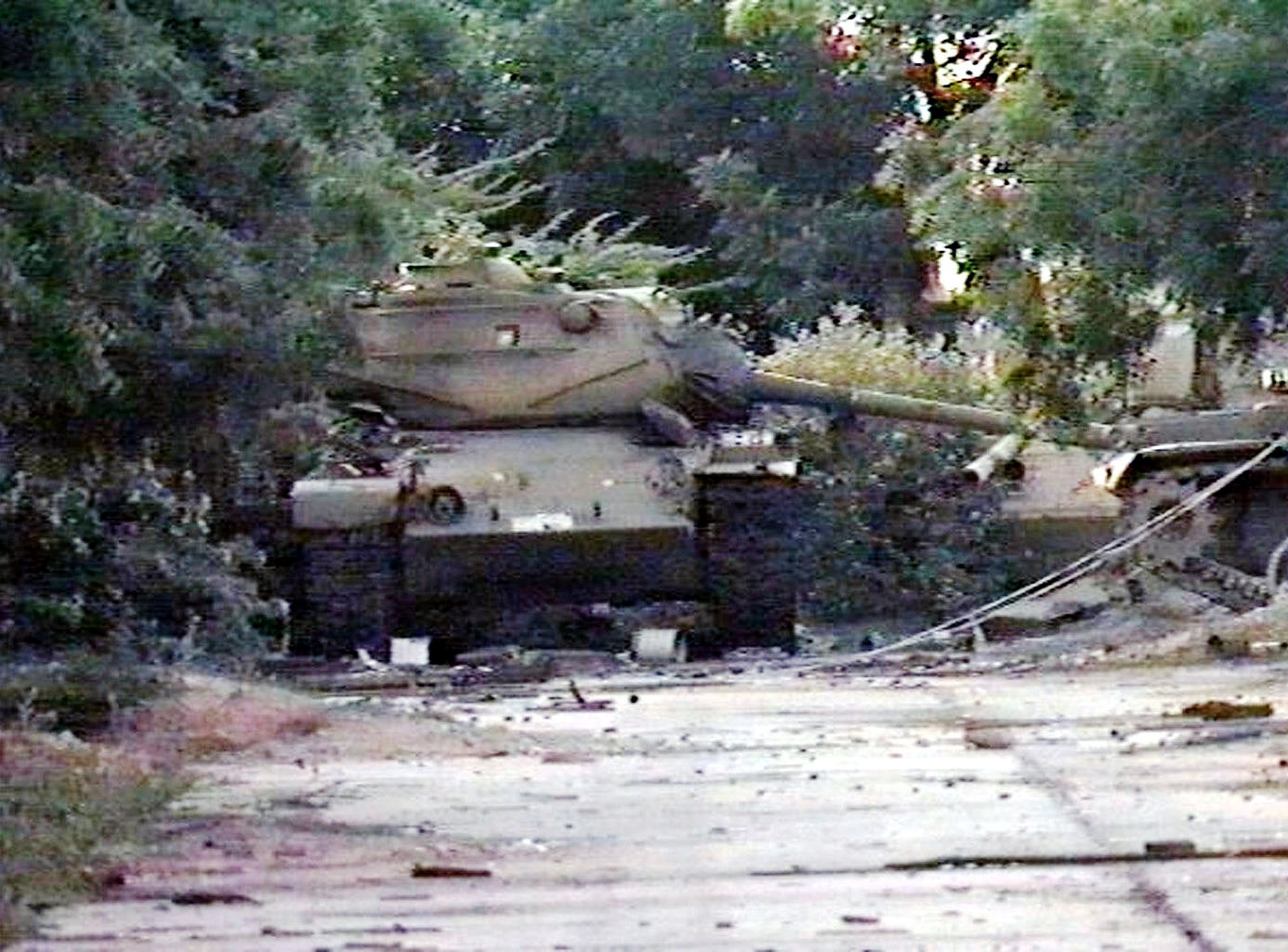
Somali National army M47 Patton tanks abandoned after the collapse of the government and armed forces (1993)

By mid-1990, United Somali Congress (USC) rebels had captured many of the towns and villages surrounding Mogadishu. By the autumn of that year, the USC had overrun the SNA divisions deployed in the Mudug, Galgudud and Hiran regions. The civilian population began rapidly arming itself as security situation unraveled and the SNA collapsed in the south.

In January 1991, the SNA collapsed as the Somali Democratic Republic was toppled by rebel groups. Much of the former SNA inventory went into the hands of various civil war factions. During 1991 and 1992 some Somali warlords operated tanks and artillery.

Many of the factions that emerged in the wake of the collapse of the government had Somali army officers leading their militia. Notably the military leadership of the Somali National Alliance, which waged an insurgency against the US military during UNOSOM II in 1993, was composed of largely of SNA personnel.

In response to growing Ethiopian military incursions into Somalia during the late 1990s, officers of the defunct SNA held their first meeting since the collapse of the state in September 1999.

=== 2000s ===
Efforts to reconstitute the SNA date back to 2000-2005 when the Transitional National Government (TNG) attempted to revive it. After the TNG failed and was replaced with the Transitional Federal Government (TFG), some of the forces organized in the early 2000s were placed under TFG command. The armed forces of the TFG were nominally under the control of the Ministry of Defence but were dominated by clan based paramilitary units. Army units generally answered only to their clan commander and refused to take orders from the Ministry of Defense.

In September 2006 the Islamic Courts Union (ICU), which controlled much of south/central Somalia, and the TFG came to an agreement to rebuild the SNA. The agreement collapsed due to the ICU objecting to the deployment of the Ethiopian military troops supporting the TFG. Ethiopia took the lead in training and integrating a new Somali army, but ultimately failed as over 10,000 Ethiopian trained TFG soldiers deserted or defected to the insurgency that erupted during the War in Somalia (2006–2009). Some senior officials within the TFG security forces accused the Ethiopians of seeking the undermine the re-establishment of the SNA, assassinating Somali officers who didn't obey their orders and of provoking their officers with indiscriminate violence against civilians during counterinsurgency operations. More than 80% of the military deserted the government by the end of 2008. When Ethiopian forces withdrew from Somalia soon after, the task of forming a new army was given to AMISOM. At this point there was still no meaningful chain of command.

The basis of the present iteration of the Somali National Army stems from the late 2008 agreement made by TFG and the insurgent opposition known as Alliance for the Re-Liberation of Somalia. After the Ethiopian withdrawal and the election of a new Somali government in early 2009, elements of the Islamic Courts forces and broader insurgency were integrated into the SNA. By this point the SNA was estimated to be 5,000 to 7,600 strong. During the same period as the SNA was reconstituted, Al-Shabaab rose to become the preeminent insurgent actor in the region. A significant portion of the population had been radicalized by the US-backed Ethiopian invasion, enabling Al-Shabaab to firmly embed itself in the Somalia's social, economic and political environment.

=== 2010s ===
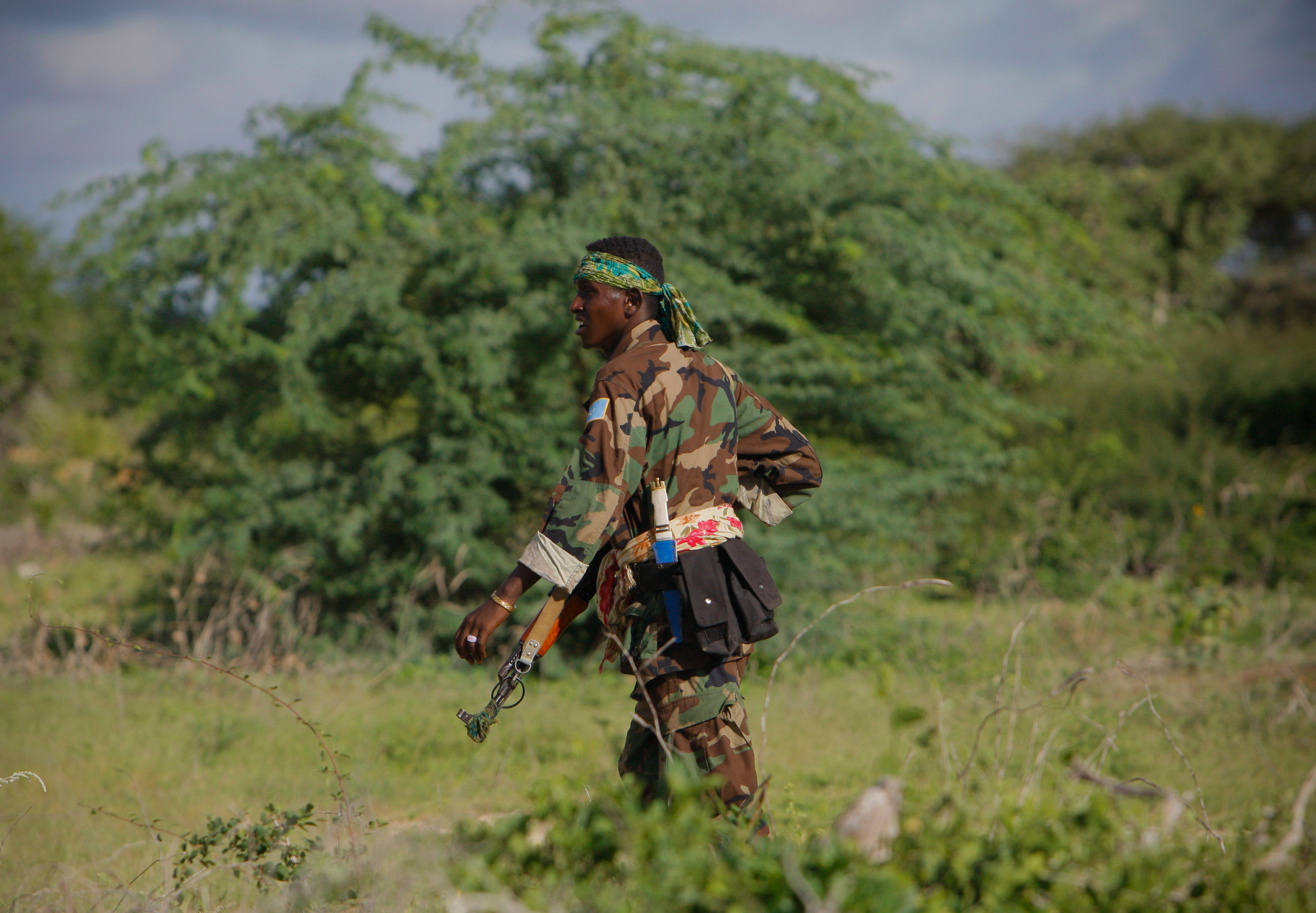
SNA soldier on patrol near Afgooye

In 2013, a major step in the revival of the SNA was made with the first division sized element of the army being reinstated. In the decade since its reconstitution, the SNA has suffered serious deficiencies in logistics, operational capacity and financial support.

There were around 20,000 troops in the army by 2014. Two years later The Economist reported that the SNA did not exist as a cohesive force due to high rates of desertion and many soldiers being primarily loyal to clan leaders rather than the government. SNA commanders often did not know where their troops located or what they were doing. In 2017 it was discovered that 30% of SNA soldiers did not even possess weapons.

The army was estimated to have around 2,100 officers, who led a force of 12 brigades. A critical issue for the SNA had been a lack of young officers, as the corps is dominated by older officers over the age of 50. The issue was worsened by the mass promotion of unqualified soldiers to the rank of officer in the mid-2010s. Tribal fissures continually undermined the cohesion of the SNA.

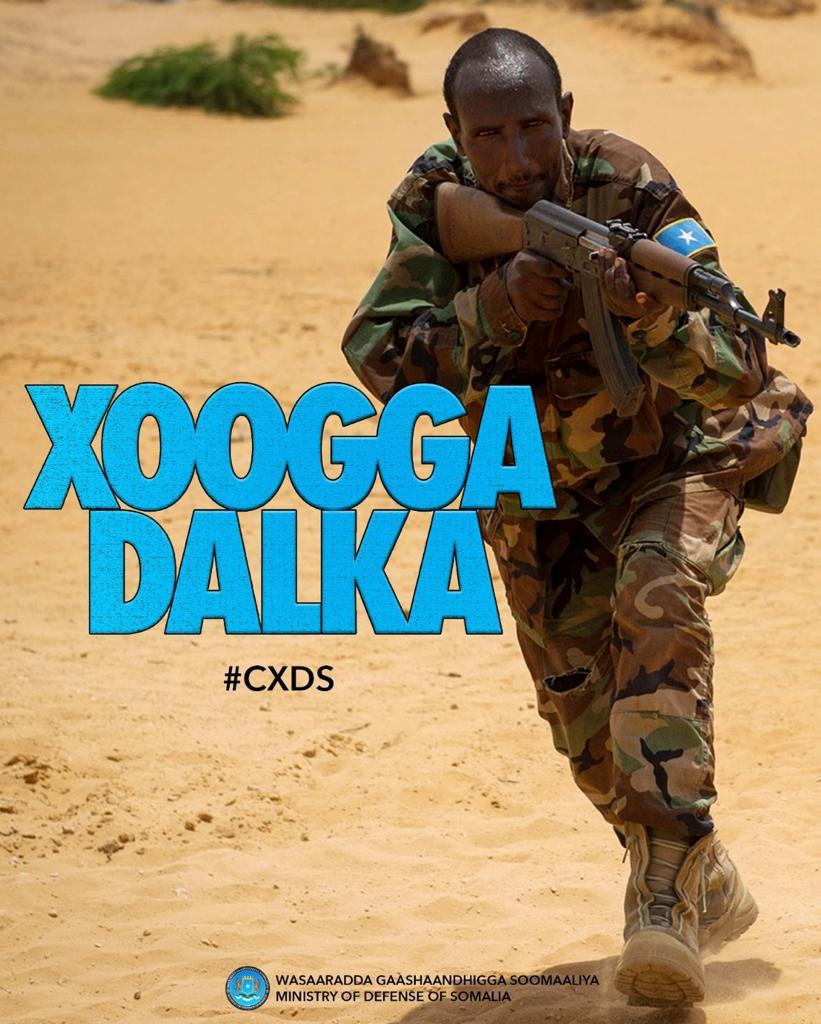
Official Somali National Army poster (2023)

Only in the late 2010s did the SNA begin to successfully reconstitute military formations of a multi-clan nature similar to the pre-1991 army. In 2017 the Turkish Armed Forces opened up its largest overseas military base in Mogadishu, known as Camp TURKSOM. More than 10,000 SNA soldiers were planned to be trained at the facility. Eritrea has also played a key role in the reestablishment of the Somali National Army. Beginning in 2019 it clandestinely began training thousands of Somali recruits on Eritrean soil in an operation overseen by NISA chief Fahad Yasin.

=== 2020s ===
By the early 2020s, Turkey said more than a third of the SNA had been trained by Turkish forces. In 2022, the SNA launched a large-scale offensive against Al-Shabaab and succeeded in seizing hundreds of settlements with the support of clan based auxiliary forces. But the following year the insurgents regrouped and launched a counter-offensive which brought the war to a stalemate. The loss of respected SNA officers during the disastrous Battle of Osweyne in August 2023 had a major negative impact of morale on the army and increased the risk of desertion.

In January 2025, the African Union mission had another name change, with the African Union Support and Stabilization Mission in Somalia (AUSSOM) succeeded ATMIS. Supporting Somali security forces in the security transition, stabilization, and operations against Al-Shabaab remained its tasks.

During 2026 tanks began arriving in Somalia for the first time in decades due to the repealing of the United Nations arms embargo on Somalia. Ten to fifteen M48 and M60 Patton tanks arrived, reportedly so that Turkey could protect the Warsheikh missile/satellite launch site (located in the same general area as the New Mogadishu International Airport construction site). Tanks had not been available to the SNA since the collapse of the army in the late 1980s and early 1990s.

The SNA remains a light infantry force and is relatively capable of capturing Al-Shabaab territory. However, it struggles to create garrison forces capable of holding positions when the insurgents counter attack. At present the war between the SNA and Al-Shabaab effectively remains locked in a stalemate.

== Organisation ==
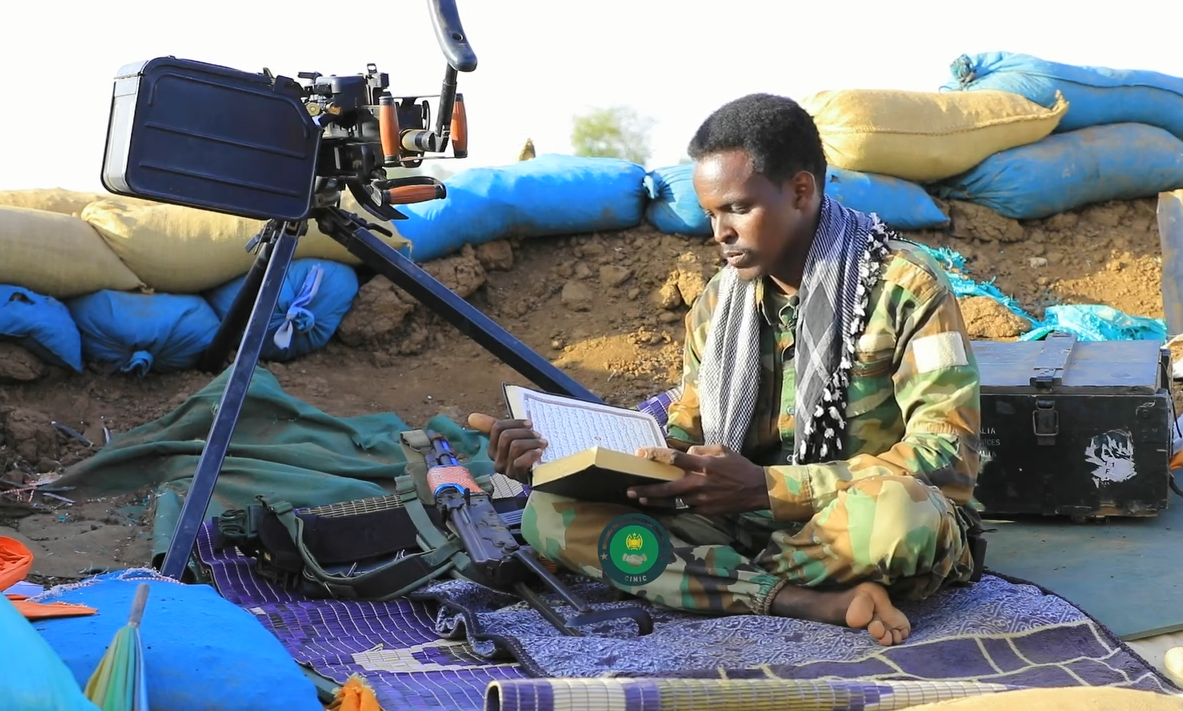
SNA soldier reading Quran in his machine gun fighting position (2026)

- Division "12 April"
- Division 60
- Division 27
  - 5th brigade
  - 29th brigade
- Division 21
- Division 26
- 43rd division
  - 11th brigade
    - 56th battalion
- Danab Brigade
  - 162nd unit
  - 16th Danab Brigade
    - 163rd Unit
    - 164th Battalion
- Gorgor Special Forces
  - 1st Gorgor Division
    - 18th Gorgor Brigade
    - 21st Gorgor Brigade,
  - 17th Gorgor Brigade
    - 175th Battalion
  - 19th Gorgor Brigades

== Former equipment ==
=== Army equipment, 1981 ===
The following heavy weaponry was in the Somali National Army's inventory during 1981:

Type	Description	Country of manufacture	Inventory
Tanks
Centurion	Main battle tank; 105 mm gun	United Kingdom	40
T-54/55	Main battle tank; 100 mm quick firing gun; most transferred 1974–1976	Soviet Union	40
Armoured personnel carriers
BTR-50	12-passenger tracked APC	Soviet Union	50
BTR-60	10-12-passenger wheeled APC	Soviet Union	50
BTR-152	12-passenger wheeled APC	Soviet Union	150
Fiat 6614	10-passenger wheeled APC	Italy	900
Fiat 6616	Armored car; 20 mm gun	Italy	900
Artillery
130 mm	Field gun, towed	Soviet Union	250
122 mm	Field gun, towed	Soviet Union	250
122 mm	Howitzer, towed	Soviet Union	250
100 mm	Anti-tank gun, field gun, towed	Soviet Union	150
85 mm	Anti-tank gun, towed	Soviet Union	150
76 mm	Divisional gun, towed	Soviet Union	150
120 mm	Heavy mortar	Soviet Union	n/a
82 mm	Medium mortar	Soviet Union	n/a
106mm	B-11 recoilless rifle	China	n/a
Anti-aircraft guns
100 mm air defense gun KS-19	Towed	Soviet Union	250
57 mm AZP S-60	Towed	Soviet Union	250
37 mm M1939	Towed	Soviet Union	250
23mm	ZU-23-2-type, towed	Soviet Union	250
Missiles
MILAN	Surface-to-surface, man-portable, anti-tank guided missile	France, West Germany	100
S-125 Neva/Pechora			

=== Army equipment, 1989 ===
Prior arms acquisitions included the following equipment, much of which was unserviceable as of June 1989:

293 main battle tanks (30 Centurion from Kuwait, 123 M47 Patton, 30 T-34, 110 T-54/55 from various sources). Other armoured fighting vehicles included 10 M41 Walker Bulldog light tanks, 30 BRDM-2 and 15 Panhard AML-90 armored cars (formerly owned by Saudi Arabia). The IISS estimated in 1989 that there were 474 armoured personnel carriers, including 64 BTR-40, BTR-50, BTR-60; 100 BTR-152 wheeled armored personnel carriers, 310 Fiat 6614 and 6616s, and that BMR-600s had been reported. The IISS estimated that there were 210 towed artillery pieces (8 M-1944 100 mm, 100 M-56 105 mm, 84 M-1938 122 mm, and 18 M198 155 mm towed howitzers). Other equipment reported by the IISS included 82 mm and 120 mm mortars, 100 Milan and BGM-71 TOW anti-tank guided missiles, rocket launchers, recoilless rifles, and a variety of Soviet air defence guns of 20 mm, 23 mm, 37 mm, 40 mm, 57 mm, and 100 mm calibre.

== Ranks and insignia ==
=== Officers ===
Rank group	General / flag officers			Senior officers			Junior officers
Somali National Army
Somali National Army	Sareeye guud	Sareeye gaas	Sareeye guuto	Gashaanle sare	Gashaanle dhexe	Gashaanle	Dhamme	Laba xídígle	Xídígle

=== Enlisted ===
Rank group	Senior NCOs					Junior NCOs		Enlisted
Somali National Army								No insignia
Somali National Army	Musharax sarkaal	Sadex xarígle	Laba xarígle	Xarígle	Sadex alífle	Laba alífle	Alífle	Dable
