= Duduble =

Somali sub clan of the Hawiye

محمود هراب

Regions with significant populations
- Galmudug Banadir Lower Shabelle

Languages
- Somali & Arabic

Religion
- Sunni Islam

The Duduble, also known as the Maxamuud Hiraab (Arabic: محمود هراب), is a Somali sub-clan of the larger Hawiye clan-family. Like most Somali clans, the Duduble trace their lineage back to Samaale, the earliest common ancestor of the major Somali clans.

== Etymology ==
The word Duduble is the proprietive form of the root word Dudub, meaning power, or strength. The name literally means the mighty or the powerful, and comes from the nickname of the clan's founder Mahamud Hiraab.

== Clan tree and distribution ==
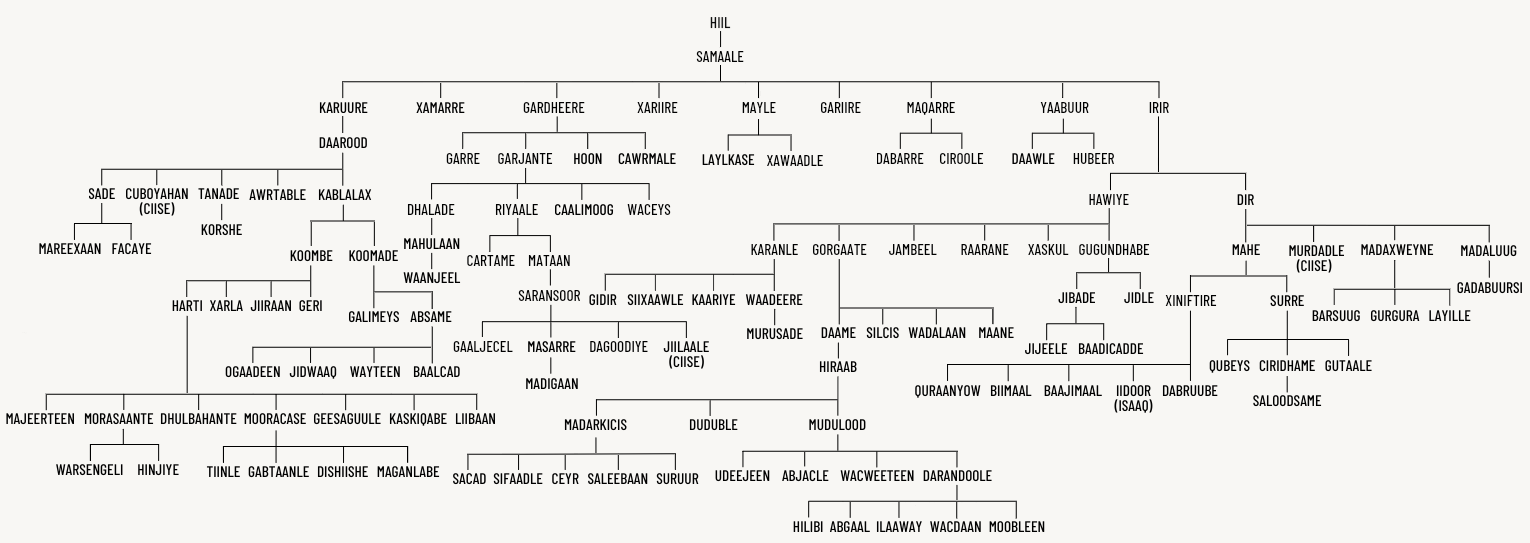
Genealogical tree of Somali clans

The Duduble are primarily represented in the regions of Galmudug and Banadir. The clan is considered the youngest among the Hiraab family.

- The Hawiye
  - Hiraab
    1. Duduble
      1. Aarsade
      2. Mohamed Amal
      3. Iijecle
      4. Habar Awradeen
      5. Maqlisame
      6. Ehli (Celi)
      7. Bisin
      8. Qadhoob
      9. Da'ud
    2. Habr Gidir
    3. Mudulood
    4. Sheekhaal

== History ==
=== Pre-colonial era ===
The Duduble are a sub-clan of Hiraab and are traditionally said to be born to an Ajuran mother. The clan was historically ruled by the chief Caaqil Siyaad Qaasim, known as Caaqil Dheryodhoobe, more than 300 years ago, or approximately eight generations past (late 1600s to late 1700s). He governed the clan in the Nugaal area before major conflicts and periods of drought prompted parts of the community to migrate south to central Somalia and other regions.

=== Colonial and Independence era ===
Italian colonial accounts indicate that the Duduble primarily lived northwest of Mogadishu and in the area between the city and Merca to the south.

According to Hussein Ali Dualeh, an Isaaq former ambassador and district governor in Mudug, writing after the civil war of the 1990s, an Isaaq leader named Haji Muse Igarre reportedly supplied the Ugaas of the Duduble, along with leaders of other clans, with approximately 10,000 rifles near Hobyo in 1921 to support their conflict against Sultan Ali Yusuf Kenadid of the Sultanate of Hobyo.

Hussein A. Duale "Awil", former Governor of Ceel Buur District in Mudug, recounted a story told to him years later by Duduble Sultan Farah Foodey:

We were not without fear or concern about fighting Kenadid. He had a large army and caused us considerable trouble. Ina Igarre promised the chiefs and elders of the Hawiye that if Kenadid's army proved stronger, they would support us with their troops. That promise encouraged us greatly; it eased our fear and anxiety. The war lasted for ten days. On the tenth day, the King and his army surrendered. We took the King and his family into our hands.

=== Civil war ===
==== United Somali Congress, Somali National Alliance and Jubba Valley Alliance ====
The Duduble were among the clans that took up arms against the regime of Mohamed Siad Barre.

Following the outbreak of the Somali Civil War in 1991, the Duduble largely operated within the United Somali Congress (USC) and later the Somali National Alliance (SNA). The clan oversaw the SNA's militia wing, the Somali Liberation Army (SLA), in Baidoa.

The Duduble participated in an 11 July 1993 meeting of various SNA-aligned sub-clans aimed at de-escalating the conflict between the SNA and UNOSOM. Delegates, including the Duduble, agreed to open political dialogue with the UNOSOM II mission. The agreement collapsed following the deadly "Bloody Monday" raid carried out by U.S. forces on behalf of UNOSOM the following day.

On 12 September 1995, clashes broke out in Mogadishu between the Duduble and the Habr Gedir Ayr. According to witnesses, the two sides exchanged heavy machine-gun fire, anti-aircraft weapons, ZU-23-2 fire, and RPG-7 rounds for roughly a day and a half before clan elders intervened to end the violence.

In July 2001, the Duduble, together with the Ayr, Murusade and sub-clans of the Marehan, formed the Juba Valley Alliance (JVA) in an effort to gain control over the fertile regions surrounding the Jubba River.

==== Mogadishu Sharia court ====
Following the emergence of Sharia courts in Mogadishu aimed at curbing widespread lawlessness, the Duduble established several Islamic courts in the 1990s. The first to become prominent was the "Milk Factory Court" (Somali: Maxkamad Warshahada Canno).

The court began forming in 1992 but was unable to function effectively until 1997, following the death of Mohamed Farrah Aidid in 1996, who had opposed the establishment of Sharia courts.

Ahmed Nuur Ali Jima'ale, CEO of Al-Barakat and a member of the Duduble, played a leading role in establishing the court along with other colleagues. The institution brought together a range of religious groups, including Salafis and religious leaders associated with Sufi orders.

According to a clan sheikh, the court carried out capital punishment for murder but allowed the victim's family to choose between accepting diya (compensation) or insisting on execution. If diya was rejected, the sentence was carried out.

=== Islamic Courts, Ethiopian invasion of Somalia and Al-Shabaab ===
==== 2000s ====
By early 2001, Duduble-run Sharia courts had carried out a total of five executions. When the Mogadishu Sharia courts merged in 2000 to form the Islamic Courts Union (ICU), the Duduble became a core component of the organization. In 2006, members of the sub-clan reportedly controlled the finances of Mogadishu's seaport and international airport on behalf of the ICU.

By 2005, a court run by the clan known as Dabaqayn was one of the eleven Sharia courts operating in Mogadishu. Although many early Sharia courts were clan-based, by 2006 Duduble ICU militias reportedly declined appeals from Duduble elders, instead pointing to the ICU's Supreme Council as the final authority.

While some members of the sub-clan served within the Transitional Federal Government (TFG), popular sympathies largely leaned toward Al-Shabaab, as the TFG was widely viewed as an Ethiopian proxy, while Al-Shabaab was regarded as the main organized resistance to the Ethiopian presence. The Duduble, along with other Hawiye sub-clans such as the Ayr and Murusade, formed the core of the resistance during the Ethiopian occupation of Mogadishu in 2007.

In the years following the fall of the ICU, the Duduble frequently clashed with the TFG, due in part to the detention and summary execution of clan members and elders by TFG forces.

Abdullahi Isse Abtidon, a Duduble TFG parliamentarian and former ICU religious leader, was assassinated on 15 April 2009 by suspected Al-Shabaab gunmen. Abtidon had been using his influence to engage hardline Islamists, and his death was considered a major setback to reconciliation efforts between Islamist factions and the TFG.

After the end of the Ethiopian occupation in January 2009, the clan held a major meeting in Mogadishu. Elders and youth agreed to continue supporting the insurgency against AMISOM forces.

On 20 January 2009, the Duduble issued a public statement:

We thank God for the withdrawal of our enemy, the Ethiopian forces, from Banaadir. We have long called for the adoption of shari'ah law, and we will adhere to this. We will also continue the jihad against the non-believing Ethiopian troops if they remain in the country. We urge the Somali people to embrace shari'ah law, the solution for our religion, people, and country. We also call on Muslims to unite in the name of the Holy Koran and be wary of the enemy's conspiracies. God bless you.

Following the withdrawal of most Ethiopian forces, Ahmed Nur Ali Jumale controlled Bakara Market and surrounding areas with a Duduble-based militia.

==== 2010s ====
In December 2011, Duduble elders in El Buur formally signed an agreement with Al-Shabaab to fight Ethiopian, Kenyan, TFG and AMISOM forces. Sheikh Awale Mohamed Ali, a clan religious figure, stated:

I advised all Somali tribes to support Al-Shabaab in defending our religion and our country. We have promised to fight both Ethiopian and Kenyan troops who entered our country.

In June 2014, members of the clan—reportedly including many civilians—fought alongside Al-Shabaab against Ethiopian forces deployed to El Buur after its capture by AMISOM in March 2014.

==== 2020s ====
Despite a long history of supporting Al-Shabaab against foreign troops and the former TFG, the Duduble are now participating in efforts to fight the organization.

== Notable figures ==
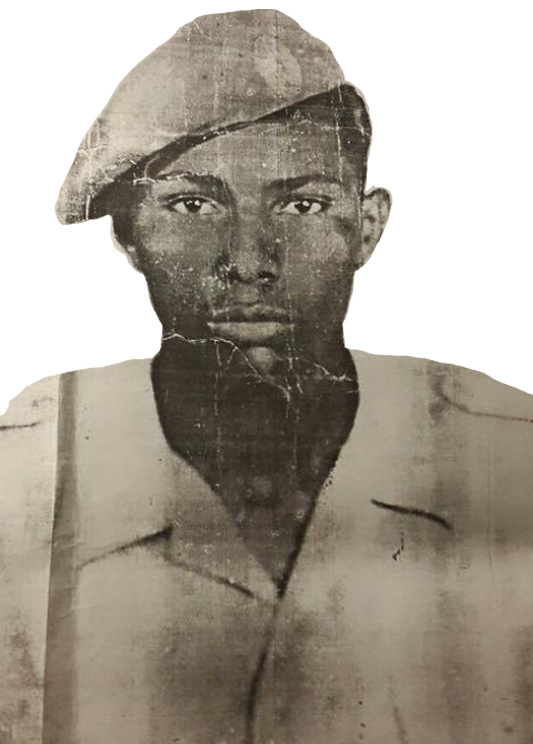
Maxamed Cabdulle Xalane

- Sheikh Ibrahim Sheikh Cali Xaashi – Former MP and one of the wealthiest businessmen in post-war Somalia. He was known as a key intermediary between the international community and Somalia and was a prominent member of President Abdiqasim's administration before his assassination in Kenya in 2003.
- Iman Elman – Somali-Canadian lieutenant colonel serving in the Somali National Army.
- Ahmed Nuur Ali Jimaaale – Business executive and owner of Hormuud Telecom.
- Mohamed Abdulle Halane – Decorated veteran of the 1964 Ethiopian–Somali Border War.
- Prof. Abdullahi Ali Afrah – Deputy Chairman of the Islamic Courts Union Consultative Council.
- Caaqil Dheryodhoobe – Historical warrior chief from central Somalia and a noted strategic leader.
- Elman Ali Ahmed – Somali entrepreneur and social activist.
- Abdi Nageeye – Somali-Dutch long-distance runner.
- Almaas Elman – Somali-Canadian humanitarian aid worker.
- Ilwad Elman – Somali-Canadian social activist working at the Elman Peace and Human Rights Center in Mogadishu alongside her mother, Fartuun Adan.
- Botan Ise Alin – Somali rebel leader and former minister in the Somali Transitional Government, where he was responsible for militia disarmament. He was also a member of the Alliance for the Restoration of Peace and Counter-Terrorism (ARPCT), a coalition of warlords opposing the Islamic Courts Union.
- Anwar Ahmed Mohamed (Aazbaro) – Somali football player.
