= Lisa Shannon =

American author, human rights activist and speaker

Lisa J. Shannon
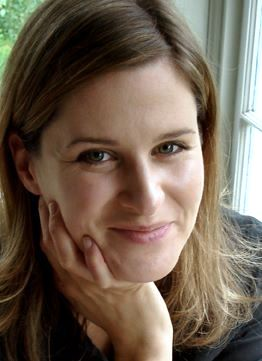
- Born: Lisa Jeanne Shannon; United States
- Occupations: Author, Human Rights Activist
- Writing career
- Notable awards: The 2010 O Power List, 2006 Hero of Running

Lisa J. Shannon is an American author, human rights activist, and speaker known for her work in the international women's movement, including founding Run for Congo Women, co-founding Sister Somalia with Fartuun Adan Abdisalan, co-founding and being CEO of Every Woman Treaty. She is author of A Thousand Sisters: My Journey Into the Worst Place on Earth to Be a Woman (Seal Press, 2010). Her second book, Mama Koko and the Hundred Gunmen: An Ordinary Family's Extraordinary Tale of Love, Loss, and Survival in Congo (Public Affairs, 2015), follows one family's struggle for survival in the shadow of Joseph Kony's Lord's Resistance Army.

== Congo ==
=== Run for Congo Women ===
Shannon founded Run for Congo Women, a volunteer effort to raise funds and awareness for women in the Democratic Republic of Congo, which began with a lone, 30.16 mile trail run in Portland, Oregon. By Fall 2010, Run for Congo Women had sponsored more than 1400 war-affected Congolese women through Women for Women International and over $12,000,000 had been raised for the program through Shannon's media appearances and Run for Congo Women events. In 2010, Shannon hosted a Run for Congo Women in Congo, where women previously sponsored by Run for Congo Women participants ran to raise funds for Congolese women in need of support. Among the runners, Congolese “sister” Generose, whose leg was amputated above the knee in an attack, participated in the run. Generose explained, “If I can run on only one leg, everyone will know they can do something to help.”

=== Dodd-Frank Congo Conflict Minerals Legislation ===
In May 2010, Shannon initiated a series of protests targeting tech companies, as covered in Nicholas Kristof's piece in The New York Times Magazine:

“Shannon has concentrated on embarrassing electronics makers, because they use parts that may contain minerals like tantalum from the area. Warlords sell these “conflict minerals,” and the idea is that if you can interrupt those supply chains, the warlords will find killing less profitable and may be more willing to negotiate. By one estimate, auditing supply lines to assure an absence of conflict minerals could cost as little as a penny per finished cellphone, laptop or electronic camera. So early this year Shannon and other activists showed up at Intel's offices near her Oregon home with 45,000 pennies, representing the 45,000 people whose deaths can be attributed to the fighting in Congo each month, according to a mortality study by the International Rescue Committee. “We said we'd be more than happy to pay a penny per product if that‘ll save lives,” Shannon said... So Shannon jumped in her car with her mother, and they drove 11 hours down to Silicon Valley to the headquarters of Intel. There they made a similar pitch, and also visited Apple and Hewlett-Packard. Finally, they dropped in on an Apple conference, and then an Apple Store opening in Washington... In the end, Shannon's work — along with that of many, many other activists — seemed to make a difference. Some electronics companies became more aggressive about scrubbing supply chains of tainted minerals. Most important, Congress addressed the issue in this year's financial-reform law, which requires companies to disclose whether they use minerals from Congo or an adjoining country, and if they do use them, to reveal how the minerals were acquired. It's a step forward, and Shannon hopes that the result will be fewer Congolese enduring rapes and massacres.”

=== A Thousand Sisters ===
In fall 2010, Shannon founded A Thousand Sisters, an online community aiming to empower everyday women and men to become leaders in the movement to end violence against women in the Democratic Republic of Congo and mass atrocities around the world. Projects included a 5 day 24-hour-a-day camp out in front of the State department in sub-freezing temperatures, paired with an online “virtual march” called Outcry for Congo, and the Facebook virtual-march on Washington, “Special Envoy Now.” E

== Somalia ==
In July 2011, Shannon co-founded Sister Somalia, the first rape hotline and support program for survivors of gender based violence in Mogadishu, in partnership with Fartuun Adan, Ilwad Elman, the Elman Peace and Human Rights Centre and Katy Grant, co-founder of Prism Partnership. New York Times reporter Jeffrey Gettleman wrote a cover story about the center and rape crisis in Somalia, featuring Sister Somalia's work. In 2013, Shannon announced the transition to the Sister Somalia project being 100% Somali-woman owned and operated by Fartuun Adan and Ilwad Elman through Elman Peace and Human Rights Center.

== Every Woman Treaty ==
In May, 2013, Shannon convened a meeting of 20 women's rights advocates from around the world at the Carr Center for Human Rights to explore the question of a need for a UN Treaty to systemically address ending violence against women and girls. The resulting collective work ultimately took the form of Every Woman Treaty, a diverse coalition of more than 1700 women's rights activists, including 840 organizations in 128 countries. As of September, 2021, Every Woman Treaty coalition advocates had met with representatives of 102 nations promoting a treaty. Shannon is co-founder and chief executive officer of Every Woman Treaty.

On September 24, 2021, in his speech to the 76th United Nations General Assembly, Nigerian President Muhammadu Buhari became of the first head of state to call for "a Treaty to end all forms of violence against women and girls of all ages”.

Leila Nazgul Seitibek, a prominent Kyrgyz human rights activist and lawyer and Najla Ayoubi, an Afghan women's rights defender, lawyer, and former judge are members of Every Woman Treaty Coalition Working Group.

== Education ==
Shannon received a Bachelor of Arts from Hampshire College. In 2012 - 2013, she earned her Master of Public Administration degree[6] from the Harvard Kennedy School of Government as a Gleitsman Leadership Fellow with the Center for Public Leadership[8], where she studied leadership and human rights.

In 2013, Shannon became a Fellow with the Harvard Kennedy School's Carr Center for Human Rights, expanding her areas of research into gaps in the international legal framework on violence against women worldwide, and the role a campaign for a UN Convention on Violence Against Women might play in the international women's movement.

In May 2013, Shannon accepted an Honorary Doctorate from Georgetown University, and delivered the commencement address at Georgetown College. In the address, she told graduates, “Empathy equals power. Some people talk about compassion fatigue, like empathy wears you down. I’ve found the opposite. I’ve found empathy to function more like a muscle. The more you exercise it, the more power it gives. The more reflexive it becomes. It's not that stepping up is more comfortable; it's just that comfort becomes less relevant in the face of empathy override…. Flip on your empathy switch. Cross that threshold. Dare. Disturb the universe.”

== Press ==
Shannon appeared on The Oprah Winfrey Show in October 2009. Her work and A Thousand Sisters have been profiled in other national media as well, including The New York Times, National Public Radio, ABC News, Time Magazine, Marie Claire, and CNN, among others.[10][11][12][13]

== Personal life ==
Shannon grew up in Portland, Oregon, and previously owned a stock photography production company, where she was art director and producer. Her activism began following the death of her father, Stewart Shannon, a therapist who treated Vietnam Vets with Post Traumatic Stress Disorder. When Shannon's activism work took over, her fiancé with whom she ran her business “signaled to her that she had to choose — and she chose Congo.”

Shannon has publicly discussed the early financial and personal costs of her work. In Nicholas Kristof's profile in the New York Times Magazine piece DIY Foreign Aid: “Devoting yourself to helping others may seem wonderfully glamorous — until you're single, jobless and alone on a Saturday night. Shannon has taken in five roommates to share her house, and she saves pennies everywhere she can, but at some point she will become a pauper unless she finds a way of supporting herself.” She now receives a salary as CEO of Every Woman Treaty and lives in Seattle, WA.

== Publications ==
=== Books ===
A Thousand Sisters: My Journey into the Worst Place on Earth to Be a Woman Seal Press (The Perseus Book Group) April 2010.

Mama Koko and the Hundred Gunmen: An Ordinary Family's Extraordinary Tale of Love, Loss, and Survival in Congo. Public Affairs (The Perseus Book Group) in Spring 2015.

=== Essays and Op-Eds ===
"A Simple Run", to the 2010 book The Enough Moment: Fighting to End Africa's Worst Human Rights Crimes, by John Prendergast with Don Cheadle.

New York Times, On the Ground, “In Meeting With Somali President, Clinton Should Stand Up for Rape Victims” Jan 2013.

New York Times, On the Ground, “Kony's Victims and the Kony 2012 Video”, March, 2012.

New York Times, On the Ground “Bosco 2012,” March 2012. Coauthored with Tony Gambino.

New York Times, On the Ground “In Mogadishu: A Lifeline For Somali Rape Victims”, July 2011.

Report from Dungu quoted in New York Times On the Ground “American Lisa and Congolese Lisa,” Feb. 2010.

The New York Times Room for Debate, “Translating Awareness Into Results”, March 2012.

The Guardian's Comment is Free, “The rape of Somalia's women is being ignored,” Oct. 2011

International Herald Tribune, “No, Sexual Violence Is Not ‘Cultural’,” June 2010.
