= Human rights in Somalia =

Human rights in Somalia throughout the late 20th-century and early 21st-century were considered dire, but have gradually improved over the following years. Human rights are guaranteed in the Federal Constitution, which was adopted in August 2012. They fall under the Ministry of Human Rights established in August 2013. The central authorities concurrently inaugurated a National Human Rights Day, endorsed an official Human Rights Roadmap, and completed Somalia's first National Gender Policy.

A Human Rights Task Force was established in February 2013 to firm up on the protection of individual rights. The federal government in December 2014 organized a public awareness campaign, passed a new 54-point national Child Protection Act, and finished legislation on a Human Rights Commission bill. According to the UN's Independent Human Rights Expert on Somalia, local human rights protection has gradually improved as government institutionalization and legislative reform have taken root.

== Human Rights Task Force ==
In early February 2013, former Prime Minister Abdi Farah Shirdon launched an Independent Task Force on Human Rights in order to firm up on the protection of individual rights. The 13-member committee of volunteers was formed after extensive consultations with civil society groups and the Speaker of Parliament, Mohamed Osman Jawari. Chaired by prominent human rights attorney Maryam Yusuf Sheikh Ali, one of four women on the panel, the Task Force includes an educator, a peace activist, leaders of Somali women's organizations, senior police officers, a humanitarian campaigner, a religious leader, and a media representative.

It is tasked with investigating allegations of human rights abuses and journalist intimidation. At the end of its three-month mandate, the committee is scheduled to publish a report on its findings and recommended courses of action. The Task Force will eventually give way to a permanent parliamentary Human Rights Commission, which will have the capacity to investigate allegations over a longer period.

== Ministry of Human Rights ==
In late August 2013 Prime Minister Shirdon established the first dedicated national Ministry for Human Rights. The federal authorities concurrently declared 27 August as Somalia's National Human Rights Day. It also endorsed a Human Rights Roadmap, which defines government duties and sets specific benchmarks to be achieved over a two-year timeframe.

On 17 January 2014, new Prime Minister Abdiweli Sheikh Ahmed joined the Human Rights portfolio with Women's Affairs to form the Ministry of Women and Human Rights. It is led by Khadijo Mohamed Diriye.

== Women's rights ==
On August 1, 2012, a new Federal Constitution was adopted, which includes several statutes related to equality as proposed by a Committee of Experts (CoE). Article 11 of the Federal Constitution guarantees equal treatment for all citizens regardless of gender.

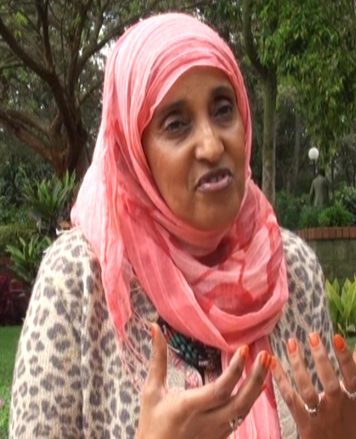
Chairperson of the Barnet Muslim Women's Network Hanan Ibrahim addressing the ISSAT (2013).

Women have since obtained greater representation in the public sphere. According to the Inter-Parliamentary Union, 30% of seats in Somalia's Federal Parliament are legally reserved for women. This quota was secured by Somali parliamentary consultant Hodan Ahmed and other female political leaders. Ahmed had also helped form the Somali Women Parliamentary Association in 2009 in the preceding Transitional Federal Parliament. In November 2012, Prime Minister Shirdon likewise appointed two women to the Cabinet, Fowsiyo Yussuf Haji Aadan as the nation's first female Minister of Foreign Affairs and Maryam Qassim as Minister of Social Development.

In June 2013, the federal government began drafting the country's first National Gender Policy. Led by Minister Maryam Qassim, the initiative was completed by August and aims to empower women, strengthen gender equality and safeguard women's rights.

According to the UNDP, the most common types of violence faced by women and men in 2012 were physical attacks (50% of reported crime cases) followed by property crimes (32%). There was a low reported overall rate of sexual violence, with a reported nationwide prevalence rate ranging from 2% to 13%. The UNDP suggested that this was possibly attributable to reluctance on the part of female youth to report such cases due to entrenched cultural and social stigmas, though male youth were more likely to report crimes in general.

Most incidents of sexual assault occurred within the context of the insurgency in southern Somalia. Over the first quarter of 2013, Amnesty International reported that 56.7% of victims in Mogadishu were internally displaced persons. According to Human Rights Watch, the government in 2013 developed comprehensive judicial and security reform plans, but had not yet followed through on those commitments. At least two women who reported rape were also prosecuted for prevarication, but were later released following appeals.

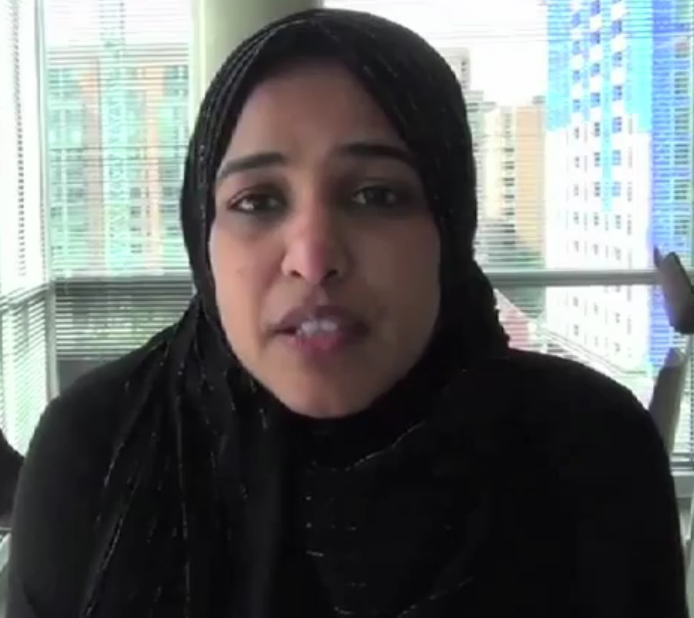
Parliamentary consultant Hodan Ahmed.

To address the issue, the central authorities as of December 2013 were in the process of forming a special crime unit to investigate and counter gender-based violence, as well as constructing a clinic set aside for victims of sexual assault. The national judiciary, security and police forces were all concurrently receiving specialized gender training as part of the broader reform effort. In June 2014, the Somali government also launched a National Action Plan against sexual violence in conjunction with local civil society groups. As part of the initiative, the Ministry of Women and Human Rights in December 2014 organized a public awareness campaign in the capital on the importance of human rights and how citizens can ensure their protection. It also completed legislation on a new Human Rights Commission bill.

According to a 2005 World Health Organization estimate, about 97.9% of Somalia's women and girls underwent female genital mutilation, a pre-marital custom mainly endemic to Northeast Africa and parts of the Near East. Encouraged by women in the community, it is primarily intended to deter promiscuity and to offer protection from assault. By 2013, UNICEF in conjunction with the Somali authorities reported that the prevalence rate among 1- to 14-year-old girls in the autonomous northern Puntland and Somaliland regions had dropped to 25% following a social and religious awareness campaign. Article 15 of the Federal Constitution also officially prohibits the practice.

Prominent human rights activists include the constitutional Committee of Experts member Hanan Ibrahim, who serves as the Chairperson of the Barnet Muslim Women's Network; Hawa Aden Mohamed, Chairperson of the Galkayo Education Centre for Peace and Development; and Fartuun Adan and her daughter Ilwad Elman, founders of the Mogadishu-based Elman Peace and Human Rights Centre.

== Children's rights ==
Article 29 of Somalia's national constitution defines a child as any individual under the age of 18, and stipulates that "every child has the right to be protected from mistreatment, neglect, abuse, or degradation."

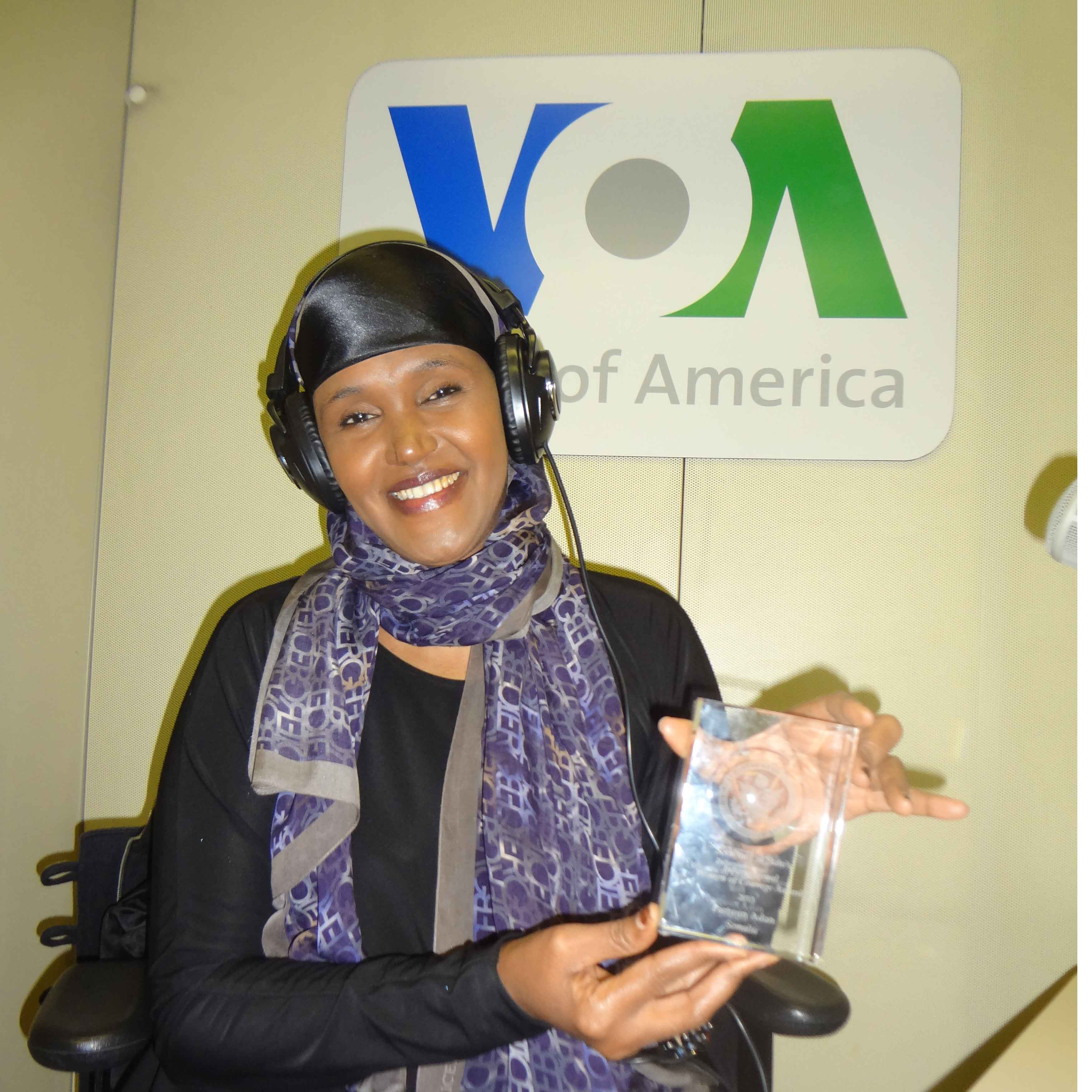
Fartuun Adan, Executive Director of the Elman Peace and Human Rights Centre.

According to UNICEF, 82% of children in Somalia in 2006 reported feeling safe in their neighborhoods during the day. 13% felt rather safe, 4% indicated that they don't know/it depends, while 0% reported feeling unsafe. With regard to night-time safety, 53% of children reported feeling safe in their neighborhoods, with 25% feeling rather safe, 4% indicating that they feel rather unsafe, 1% reporting that they feel very unsafe, while 16% stated that they don't know/it depends.

Regarding incidences of violence among family/friends and against children, 72% of urban children reported no such incidents, whereas 20% responded affirmatively. 90% of children indicated that they were not themselves the victims of violence, while 10% reported that they were. Of the types of violence experienced by family/friends and by the children, the majority consisted of robbery (37%), followed by assault (28%), rape (19%), family member killed (11%), verbal assault (11%), genocide/war (8%), abduction (6%), being beat/caned seriously (4%), quarreling (3%), and uncertain (2%).

Regarding the extent of trust they had in different societal groups, the children indicated that they most trusted their mother (85% totally; 7% quite) and their father (71% totally; 15% quite). They also asserted that they least trusted the police (3% not very much; 7% not at all) and the mass media (3% not very much; 5% not at all). Additionally, the majority of children reported being aware of their rights (78%), with their right to education (72%), right not to be hurt or mistreated (63%), and right to health (62%) most widely recognized.

With regard to the extent to which various rights are respected in Somalia, most children felt that their main rights were respected, including the right to education (58% totally; 19% quite; 3% not quite; 1% not at all; 11% don't know; 7% no response), right not to be mistreated (46% totally; 24% quite; 4% not quite; 5% not at all; 14% don't know; 8% no response), and right to health (52% totally; 22% quite; 3% not quite; 3% not at all; 12% don't know; 7% no response). Regarding their general state of happiness, 86% of children reported feeling happy, 10% were neither happy nor unhappy, and 3% were unhappy. A majority of the children also indicated that the quality of their relationship with their parents was very good (72%), followed by good (17%).

In terms of the proportion of children working for money, 93% reported that they don't work. 6% indicated that they were carrying out a regular part-time job, 6% stated that they were carrying out an occasional or part-time job, and 4% asserted that they were carrying out a full-time job. 64% of children reported not being engaged in unpaid work, 20% indicated that they were carrying out a regular unpaid part-time job, 15% stated that they were carrying out an occasional part-time unpaid job, and 0% indicated that they were carrying out a full-time unpaid job.

In March 2014, Prime Minister Abdiweli Sheikh Ahmed ratified three core International Labour Organization conventions on behalf of the Federal Republic of Somalia, including the Worst Forms of Child Labour Convention. In December 2014, the Federal Parliament also passed a new 54-point national Child Protection Act, which had been formulated by the Ministry for Women Affairs and Human Rights. Additionally, the legislature concurrently ratified the UN Convention on the Rights of the Child. President Hassan Sheikh Mohamud later signed the treaty in January 2015, making Somalia the 195th state party to ratify the global Convention.

== Ethnic minority rights ==
Article 11 of the national constitution stipulates that the state must not discriminate against any individual on the basis of race, colour, tribe or ethnicity.

The Gabboye occupational clans, which include the numerically few Madhiban, Yibir and Tumaal (collectively referred to as sab) and the Wardei clan, have over the years obtained little political representation within Somalia. Their general social status has correspondingly improved with the expansion of urban centers. However, due to their foreign, non-Somali origins, people from the Bantu and Wardei ethnic minority groups still often face societal marginalization.

In 2013, the federal government announced that it would establish its Directorate General for Human and Minority Rights and Rule of Law within the Office of the Prime Minister. Through the Ministry of Interior and Federal Affairs, it also launched a new national Agency for Refugees and IDPs, which is tasked with handling legislation, response initiatives, advocacy and implementation vis-a-vis returning and internally displaced citizens.

== Freedom of religion ==
Current (December 2024) political and military control in ongoing Somali Civil War (2009–present)

Freedom of religion in Somalia refers to the extent to which people in Somalia are freely able to practice their religious beliefs, taking into account government policies, non-state actors, and societal attitudes toward religious groups. Due to the Somali Civil War, the enforcement of laws pertaining to religion by the various autonomous governments in the region is inconsistent.

Sunni Islam is the state religion in Somalia. Generally, the judiciary in most areas relies on xeer (traditional and customary law), sharia, and the penal code. In many regions, activity by Salafi groups further restricts religious freedom, as individuals are afraid of reprisal.

Islam is a core part of Somali national identity. In 1961 Islam was declared the state religion and subsequent governments have maintained this policy. The Somali Democratic Republic, which existed from 1969 to 1991, propagated a combination of Islam and Marxism. Following the collapse of this government, Somalia entered a prolonged civil war which has continued on and off since the 1990s. The official transitional national government has continued to uphold Islam as the state religion, and further established that the Somali legal code is based on principles of Islamic law. The region of Somaliland, which seceded at the outset of the civil war and remained autonomous but internationally unrecognized until 2025, established its own constitution founded on similar religious precepts. Activity by various Islamist insurgent groups further limits religious freedom, as individuals who do not comply with these groups' interpretations of Islamic law are targeted for reprisals.

== Freedom House index ==
The following chart shows Somalia's ratings since 1972 on Freedom House's annual Freedom in the World index. A rating of 1 is "free"; 7, "not free".^{1}

Historical ratings

Year	Political Rights	Civil Liberties	Status	President
1972	7	6	Not Free	Mohamed Siad Barre
1973	7	6	Not Free	Mohamed Siad Barre
1974	7	6	Not Free	Mohamed Siad Barre
1975	7	6	Not Free	Mohamed Siad Barre
1976	7	7	Not Free	Mohamed Siad Barre
1977	7	7	Not Free	Mohamed Siad Barre
1978	7	7	Not Free	Mohamed Siad Barre
1979	7	7	Not Free	Mohamed Siad Barre
1980	7	7	Not Free	Mohamed Siad Barre
1981	7	7	Not Free	Mohamed Siad Barre
1982^{2}	7	7	Not Free	Mohamed Siad Barre
1983	7	7	Not Free	Mohamed Siad Barre
1984	7	7	Not Free	Mohamed Siad Barre
1985	7	7	Not Free	Mohamed Siad Barre
1986	7	7	Not Free	Mohamed Siad Barre
1987	7	7	Not Free	Mohamed Siad Barre
1988	7	7	Not Free	Mohamed Siad Barre
1989	7	7	Not Free	Mohamed Siad Barre
1990	7	7	Not Free	Mohamed Siad Barre
1991	7	7	Not Free	Mohamed Siad Barre
1992	7	7	Not Free	Ali Mahdi Muhammad
1993	7	7	Not Free	Ali Mahdi Muhammad
1994	7	7	Not Free	Ali Mahdi Muhammad
1995	7	7	Not Free	Ali Mahdi Muhammad
1996	7	7	Not Free	Ali Mahdi Muhammad
1997	7	7	Not Free	Ali Mahdi Muhammad
1998	7	7	Not Free	-
1999	7	7	Not Free	-
2000	6	7	Not Free	-
2001	6	7	Not Free	Abdiqasim Salad Hassan
2002	6	7	Not Free	Abdiqasim Salad Hassan
2003	6	7	Not Free	Abdiqasim Salad Hassan
2004	6	7	Not Free	Abdiqasim Salad Hassan
2005	6	7	Not Free	Abdullahi Yusuf Ahmed
2006	7	7	Not Free	Abdullahi Yusuf Ahmed
2007	7	7	Not Free	Abdullahi Yusuf Ahmed
2008	7	7	Not Free	Abdullahi Yusuf Ahmed
2009	7	7	Not Free	Adan Mohamed Nuur Madobe
2010	7	7	Not Free	Sharif Sheikh Ahmed
2011	7	7	Not Free	Sharif Sheikh Ahmed
2012	7	7	Not Free	Sharif Sheikh Ahmed
2013	7	7	Not Free	Hassan Sheikh Mohamud
2014	7	7	Not Free	Hassan Sheikh Mohamud
2015	7	7	Not Free	Hassan Sheikh Mohamud
2016	7	7	Not Free	Hassan Sheikh Mohamud
2017	7	7	Not Free	Hassan Sheikh Mohamud
2018	7	7	Not Free	Mohamed Abdullahi Mohamed
2019	7	7	Not Free	Mohamed Abdullahi Mohamed
2020	7	7	Not Free	Mohamed Abdullahi Mohamed
2021	7	7	Not Free	Mohamed Abdullahi Mohamed
2022	7	7	Not Free	Mohamed Abdullahi Mohamed
2023	7	7	Not Free	Hassan Sheikh Mohamud

== International treaties ==
International human rights treaties that Somalia has signed or ratified include:

International treaties

Treaty	Organization	Introduced	Signed	Ratified
Convention on the Prevention and Punishment of the Crime of Genocide	United Nations	1948	-	-
International Convention on the Elimination of All Forms of Racial Discrimination	United Nations	1966	-	1971
International Covenant on Economic, Social and Cultural Rights	United Nations	1966	1967	1975
International Covenant on Civil and Political Rights	United Nations	1966	-	1990
First Optional Protocol to the International Covenant on Civil and Political Rights	United Nations	1966	-	1990
Convention on the Non-Applicability of Statutory Limitations to War Crimes and Crimes Against Humanity	United Nations	1968	-	-
International Convention on the Suppression and Punishment of the Crime of Apartheid	United Nations	1973	1974	1975
Convention on the Elimination of All Forms of Discrimination against Women	United Nations	1979	-	-
Convention against Torture and Other Cruel, Inhuman or Degrading Treatment or Punishment	United Nations	1984	-	1990
Convention on the Rights of the Child	United Nations	1989	2002	2015
Second Optional Protocol to the International Covenant on Civil and Political Rights, aiming at the abolition of the death penalty	United Nations	1989	-	-
International Convention on the Protection of the Rights of All Migrant Workers and Members of Their Families	United Nations	1990	-	-
Optional Protocol to the Convention on the Elimination of All Forms of Discrimination against Women	United Nations	1999	-	-
Optional Protocol to the Convention on the Rights of the Child on the Involvement of Children in Armed Conflict	United Nations	2000	2005	-
Optional Protocol to the Convention on the Rights of the Child on the Sale of Children, Child Prostitution and Child Pornography	United Nations	2000	-	-
Convention on the Rights of Persons with Disabilities	United Nations	2006	-	-
Optional Protocol to the Convention on the Rights of Persons with Disabilities	United Nations	2006	-	-
International Convention for the Protection of All Persons from Enforced Disappearance	United Nations	2006	-	-
Optional Protocol to the International Covenant on Economic, Social and Cultural Rights	United Nations	2008	-	-
Optional Protocol to the Convention on the Rights of the Child on a Communications Procedure	United Nations	2011	-	-

== See also ==
- Judiciary of Somalia
- LGBTQ rights in Somalia

== Notes ==
1. Note that the "Year" signifies the "Year covered". Therefore the information for the year marked 2008 is from the report published in 2009, and so on.
2. The 1982 report covers the year 1981 and the first half of 1982, and the following 1984 report covers the second half of 1982 and the whole of 1983. In the interest of simplicity, these two aberrant "year and a half" reports have been split into three year-long reports through extrapolation.
