= LGBTQ rights in Somalia =

- Location of Somalia
- Legal status: Illegal since 1899: Civil, Sharia, or local customary law may be applied in Federal Republic of Somalia
- Penalty: Sharia: Capital punishment; Civil law: Prison sentences from 3 months – 3 years
- Gender identity: No
- Military: No
- Discrimination protections: No

Family rights
- Recognition of relationships: No recognition of same-sex unions
- Adoption: No

Lesbian, gay, bisexual, transgender, and queer (LGBTQ) people in Somalia face severe challenges not experienced by non-LGBTQ residents. Consensual same-sex sexual activity is illegal for both men and women. In areas controlled by al-Shabaab, and in Jubaland, capital punishment is imposed for such sexual activity. In other areas, where Sharia does not apply, the civil law code specifies prison sentences of up to three years as penalty. LGBTQ people are regularly prosecuted by the government and additionally face stigmatization among the broader population. Stigmatization and criminalisation of homosexuality in Somalia occur in a legal and cultural context where 99% of the population follow Islam as their religion, while the country has had an unstable government and has been subjected to a civil war for decades.

== History ==
=== British Somali Coast Protectorate ===
Prior to independence from the British, Section 377 of the Indian Penal Code of 1860 was applied in British Somali Coast protectorate in 1899. In the United Kingdom itself, sodomy laws were abolished in 1967. It has since legalized homosexuality, civil partnership, and same-sex marriage. The influence of Section 377 throughout former British colonies has widely come to be seen as leaving a legacy of discrimination, violence, and death, that persists in many places to this day.

=== Italian East Africa ===
In 1940, Italy conquered British Somaliland and annexed it into the Italian East Africa. While Italy had been free of sodomy laws since 1890, the Fascist regime still punished homosexuals. In 1941, the British reconquered British Somaliland and re-instated their sodomy laws.

=== Somali Republic ===
In 1964, a new penal code came into force in the Somali Republic. The code states that "Whoever has carnal intercourse with a person of the same sex shall be punished, where the act does not constitute a more serious crime, with imprisonment from three months to three years. Where the act committed is an act of lust different from carnal intercourse, the punishment imposed shall be reduced by one-third."

== Legality of same-sex sexual activity ==
=== Somali Democratic Republic ===
Under Article 409 of the Somali Penal Code introduced by the Somali Democratic Republic in 1973, sexual intercourse with a person of the same sex is punishable by imprisonment from three months to three years. An "act of lust" other than sexual intercourse is punishable by a prison term of two months to two years. Under Article 410 of the Somali Penal Code, an additional security measure may accompany sentences for homosexual acts, usually coming in the form of police surveillance to prevent "re-offending".

== Recognition of same-sex unions ==
The Marriage Law of the 1974 states that marriage is defined as "a contract between a man and a woman having equal rights and duties with the object of creating a family."

== Living conditions ==
The U.S. Department of State's 2010 Human Rights Report found that "sexual orientation was considered a taboo topic, and there was no public discussion of this issue in any region of the country," and that "there were no reports of societal violence or discrimination based on sexual orientation." The 2022 edition similarly reported that "due to severe societal stigma that prevented LGBTQI+ individuals from making their sexual orientation or gender identity known publicly", there was little-to-no reporting of discrimination. In addition, the report stated: "There remained a pervasive social stigma against same-sex relationships, and the law does not prohibit discrimination based on sexual orientation or gender identity."

=== LGBTQ organizations ===
As of 2004, one group reportedly existed for LGBTQ people in Somalia. However lots of Somali immigrants have formed majority Somali or even solely Somali LGBTQ organizations in Canada. The US Department of State reported in 2022 that: "There were few, very discreet, and mostly online-based LGBTQI+ organizations that held events."

=== Civil war ===
In territories controlled by Harakat al-Shabaab al-Mujahideen in Somalia, the terrorist organization enacts a strict interpretation of shariah which explicitly criminalises homosexual activity. The punishment for those found guilty is at a judge's discretion and may be punished by death The ILGA reported in 2021 that it had information on enforcement by al-Shabaab, or other non-state armed groups, killing individuals for alleged homosexual activity: Two male teenagers aged 15 and 18 together with a man aged 20 in 2017; and in 2018, another "young man". Verification of the incidents, independent from information supplied by the insurgent groups, was generally not available. The exact nature of the supposed offences was not clear in all cases. A number of human rights and LGBTQ activists, and those accused of "homosexuality", have been forced to flee the country for fear of execution or assassination.

In 2024, two men were executed by Al-Shabab for homosexuality.

== HIV/AIDS ==
=== Prevention ===
Family planning services are hard to access, as is fact-based information on human sexuality. Humanitarian workers have stated that Islamic social mores often make it difficult to publicly talk about how the virus can be spread. Since 1999, much of the AIDS/HIV education and care has come from international organizations such as the United Nations.

Despite this, Somalia and neighbouring Ethiopia has one of the lowest HIV infection rates on the continent. While the estimated HIV prevalence rate in Somalia in 1987 (the first case report year) was one percent of adults, a more recent estimate from 2007 now places it at only 0.5 percent of the nation's adult population.

=== HIV prevalence by region ===
The HIV prevalence in 2004 - sentinel sites of the three regional zones
Region/Zone and Sentinel Site	Number Tested	Number Positive	Percentage Positive
Somaliland
Hargeisa	499	8	1.6
Berbera	350	8	2.29
Borama	362	4	1.10
Burco	350	2	0.57
Mean - Somaliland	1561	22	1.41
Puntland
Bosaso	324	3	0.93
Garowe	284	2	1.70
Mean - Puntland	897	9	1.00
Galmudug			
Galkayo	289	4	1.38
South Central
Mogadishu	1232	11	0.89
Merca	350	0	0.0
Jowhar	351	1	0.28
Hudur	351	1	0.29
Mean - South Central	2165	13	0.60
Mean - Overall	4732	44	0.93

== Summary table ==
Same-sex sexual activity legal	Illegal: : Capital punishment (As sharia may be applied, especially by non-state actors and by some constituent states); No Imprisonment from 3 months to 3 years [under civil penal code]
Equal age of consent	No
Anti-discrimination laws in employment	No
Anti-discrimination laws in the provision of goods and services	No
Anti-discrimination laws in all other areas (incl. indirect discrimination, hate speech)	No
Same-sex marriage	No
Recognition of same-sex couples	No
Step-child adoption by same-sex couples	No
Joint adoption by same-sex couples	No
Gays and lesbians allowed to serve openly in the military	No
Right to change legal gender	No
Access to IVF for lesbians	No
Commercial surrogacy for gay male couples	No
MSMs allowed to donate blood	No

== Prominent LGBT+ activists/advocates ==
- Amal Aden
- Farah Abdullahi Abdi
- Sumaya Dalmar
- Yusuf Abdullahi

== See also ==
- LGBTQ people and Islam
- LGBTQ rights in Africa
- LGBTQ rights in Somaliland
- Human rights in Somalia
- Capital punishment for homosexuality
- Capital punishment in Somalia
