= Stoning of Aisha Ibrahim Duhulow =

Public execution of a Somali girl

Aisha Ibrahim Duhulow
- Born: c. 1994-1995
- Died: 27 October 2008 (aged 13); Kismayo, Somalia
- Cause of death: Execution by stoning

The stoning of Aisha Ibrahim Duhulow was a public execution carried out by the Al-Shabaab militant group on 27 October 2008 in the southern port town of Kismayo, Somalia. Duhulow's father and aunt stated that she was a 13-year-old girl and that she had been arrested and stoned to death after trying to report that she had been raped. Initial reports had stated that Duhulow was a 13-year-old girl found guilty of adultery; she was, however, under the age of marriage eligibility. The execution took place in a public stadium attended by about 1,000 bystanders, several of whom attempted to intervene but were shot by the militants.

According to Amnesty International, Al-Shabaab had formally charged Duhulow with adultery.

== Background ==
In 1991, the government of then President of Somalia Siad Barre was overthrown by a coalition of armed factions. The Islamic Courts Union (ICU) took control of the southern half of Somalia in 2006, imposing Shari'a law. In 2006, the Transitional Federal Government (TFG) assisted by Ethiopian troops re-captured the capital Mogadishu, largely driving the ICU's leaders out of the country. Al-Shabaab, the youth branch of the ICU's militias, subsequently stayed behind to take up guerrilla warfare against the TFG and the Ethiopian military. In 2008, the group was designated as a terrorist organization by the United States, which launched missile strikes against the militants early in the year. Several thousand local civilians were killed by the militants during the height of the insurgency between December 2006 and October 2008. In the months leading up to Duhulow's execution, Al-Shabaab had been gaining strength, as it had seized control of the Port of Kismayo, essentially shut down Mogadishu's Aden Adde International Airport, and dismantled pro-government roadblocks.

== Incident ==
Duhulow and her family moved to the southern city of Kismayo, Somalia from the Hagardeer refugee camp in Dadaab, Kenya in July 2008. According to one of her teachers, Muno Mohamed Osman, who had taught Duhulow for a few months and did not remember her well, she struggled during class and "didn't look mentally fit[...] She was always in trouble with students, teachers[...] She was just a child." Three months after her arrival in Kismayo, Duhulow was reportedly raped by three armed men while travelling on foot to visit her grandmother in Mogadishu in October 2008. Her aunt took her to a police station to report the incident to the Al-Shabaab Islamist militia in Kismayo, which at the time controlled the city's court system. They were asked to return to the station a few days later, having been told that two suspects had been apprehended. Duhulow was subsequently arrested by the insurgents under charges that she had "chatted up" the men and committed adultery. She was then sentenced to death by stoning. The militant tribunal asserted that Duhulow had come to it with an admission of guilt, and that she was repeatedly asked to reconsider her confession but that she instead insisted that she wanted Sharia law and the attendant punishment to be applied. One militant, Sheik Hayakalah, stated that "the evidence came from her side and she officially confirmed her guilt[...] She told us that she was happy with the punishment under Islamic law." No attempts were made by the insurgent group to apprehend Duhulow's purported attackers.

== Execution ==
On 27 October 2008, during the afternoon, several militants transported Duhulow to a public stadium in Kismayo containing around 1,000 people. She reportedly struggled with the insurgents and at one point screamed, "What do you want from me[...] I'm not going, I'm not going. Don't kill me." Four militants subsequently forced Duhulow into a dug out hole, burying her up to the neck. Around 50 militants participated in the ensuing execution, throwing rocks at her head. According to witnesses, nurses were then instructed to verify whether Duhulow was still alive. After ten minutes, she was dug out of the hole and two nurses confirmed that she was still alive, after which point Duhulow was put back in the hole and the stoning resumed. Although many witnesses to the event were too afraid of the armed militants to intervene, several bystanders attempted to save her. The insurgents responded by opening fire on them, in the process killing an eight-year-old boy. An Al-Shabaab spokesman later apologised for the eight-year-old's death, and pledged that the shooter would be punished.

== Impact ==
In December 2008, Nada Ali of Human Rights Watch (HWR) cited Duhulow as an example of women in the parts of south-central Somalia that were at the time under insurgent control who had little recourse to fair trials and health services. She stated, "Aisha's horrific death is likely to discourage rape victims from reporting rape or seeking justice from the Islamist insurgents." Ali also urged the United Nations Security Council to form an international investigative commission to inquire into the worst crimes reportedly committed against civilians during the conflict.

CBC journalist Debi Goodwin wrote, "To the world, Aisha became a symbol of the dangers of extremism." On 27 October 2010, a "2nd Annual Memorial Lecture" was held by the Newcastle Amnesty Group to commemorate the second anniversary of Duhulow's death. That same year, Associate Professor Susanne Scholtz dedicated her book, Sacred Witness: Rape in the Hebrew Bible (2010), to her great-aunt, the rape victims in the Congo, and Duhulow, saying, "I honor Aisha and what she had to endure in her young life."

== Responses ==
=== Al-Shabaab ===
The Al-Shabaab militia prohibited journalists from taking pictures of the stoning, but allowed them to document the event. Militants initially reported that the stoning victim was a woman who had confessed to adultery. Witnesses and local journalists estimated her age at 23 based on her appearance. A few days later, Amnesty International reported that Duhulow's father had told them that she was only 13, under the age of marriage eligibility, and that she was arrested and executed after trying to report that she had been raped. Her aunt, who had taken her to the police to report the alleged assault, reiterated the father's statement regarding her age. A human rights activist in the area subsequently informed BBC News that he had received death threats from Al-Shabaab for allegedly disseminating false information on the incident. However, he denied any involvement with the Amnesty International press release.

=== International organizations ===
Notable reactions by international organizations immediately after the Duhulow incident included:

- Amnesty International's Somalia Campaigner David Copeman said, "This was not justice, nor was it an execution. This child suffered a horrendous death at the behest of the armed opposition groups who currently control Kismayo. This killing is yet another human rights abuse committed by the combatants to the conflict in Somalia, and again demonstrates the importance of international action to investigate and document such abuses, through an International Commission of Inquiry."
- Christian Balslev-Olesen, UNICEF Representative for Somalia, said in response to the killing, "This is a tragic and deplorable incident. A child was victimized twice — first by the perpetrators of the rape and then by those responsible for administering justice." UNICEF also cited the incident as an example of the vulnerability that females in the conflict-stricken parts of Somalia were at the time faced with.
- Radhika Coomaraswamy, Under-Secretary-General of the United Nations and Special Representative for Children and Armed Conflict, said, "The incident highlights the extreme nature of violence against children and women in Somalia which has been heightened by the increasing lawlessness. It is the duty of the international community and the local authorities to stop these violations and to ensure better protection for children. No efforts should be spared."
- The Global Campaign to Stop Killing and Stoning Women released a statement urging people to "write a letter to the representatives of Somalia, the African Union, and various UN human rights offices to encourage them to take action by investigating this murder, bringing the perpetrators to justice, and denouncing the actions of these insurgents".

=== Local reactions ===
Mohamed Abdullahi, director of the Somali Community Initiative in the United Kingdom, said that many Somali immigrants in the UK had been sympathetic to Al-Shabaab in the previous years and had sent funds to it. He further said, "Over here in Britain, they are not seeing the violence that they are fuelling, or realising that al-Shabaab has some very hardline policies. Many people here were shocked to hear about the stoning incident, and said that it was not Islamic. In that case, they should think twice about sending money."

The African newspaper Maghrebia reported that the incident drew outrage in the Maghreb region of Northwest Africa. Bassima Hakkaoui, a Moroccan Islamist Justice and Development Party MP, commented, "In principle, the state has laws which specify which party is supposed to give judgement, along with the nature of the crime. It defies logic to hand down a death sentence to a woman who has been raped." Islamic educationalist Hamid Baalla agreed, saying, "You cannot describe people who resort to such actions as Muslim. These people are radicals and extremists." It was described as "inhumane, barbarous" by Moroccan Organization for Human Rights President Amina Bouayache and as "an act of terrorism towards the Somali people, particularly women" by women's rights activist Hind Mbarki.

The stoning was equally condemned in Tunisia and Algeria, where head of the Mounia Association for the Protection of Single Women Zakia Gawaou described the situation as unacceptable. Muslim scholar Houssine Mohamed stated, "Adultery, in Aisha's case, was not voluntary. She was a victim of rape, as is the case of many young girls and women in Algeria who are raped by extremists. Therefore, sentencing her to death cannot be related to Islam." Khadija Cherif, President of the Tunisian Association of Democratic Women, said, "We condemn violence against women for whatever reason or purpose, especially violence that denies human beings of their right to live." Sofiene Ben Hmida, a member of the Tunisian League for the Defence of Human Rights, remarked, "This is an act committed by people who are living outside history. The danger doesn't lie with those people, but with those who just watch what they do without confronting them strongly and firmly." Iqbal Gharbi, professor of Sharia and Religious Principles at Zeitouna University, called the incident an "act of barbarism worthy of denunciation".

== See also ==
- Human rights in Somalia
- Capital punishment in Somalia

== Bibliography ==
- Benson, Ophelia; Stangroom, Jeremy (2009). Does God Hate Women?. Continuum. ISBN 978-0826498267.
- Dickinson, Rob (2012). Examining Critical Perspectives on Human Rights. Cambridge University Press. ISBN 978-1107006935.
- Goodwin, Debbie (2011). Citizens of Nowhere: From Refugee Camp to Canadian Campus. Random House. ISBN 978-0385667234.
- Scholz, Susanne (2010). Sacred Witness: Rape in the Hebrew Bible. Fortress Press. ISBN 978-1451423754.
