= Leila Nazgül Seiitbek =

Kyrgyzstani lawyer and activist (born 1979)

- Лейла Назгуль Сейитбек
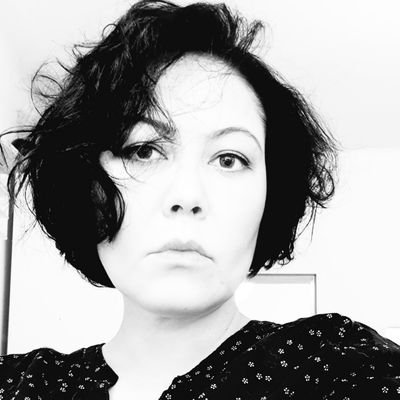
- Born: March 8, 1979 (age 47); Bishkek, Kyrgyz SSR, Soviet Union
- Education: Kyrgyz National University (KNU)
- Occupations: Human Rights Lawyer, Founder and Chairwoman of Freedom For Eurasia
- Years active: 2001 - present
- Organization: Freedom For Eurasia
- Website: https://freedomforeurasia.org/

Leila Nazgül Seiitbek (Kyrgyz: Лейла Назгуль Сейитбек, born 8 March 1979 in Bishkek, Kyrgyz Republic) is a prominent human rights activist and a lawyer from Kyrgyzstan known for her advocacy work in Central Asia: Kazakhstan, Kyrgyzstan, Uzbekistan, Tajikistan and Turkmenistan. She is a human rights defender, legal researcher, and civil society leader specializing in kleptocracy and corruption, political repression, torture, and transnational persecution in Central Asia. She was a member and international advocacy manager of the Association for Human Rights in Central Asia from 2009 to 2020. She is currently the chairperson and founder of the Vienna-based Freedom for Eurasia nonprofit, where she leads investigative documentation, legal analysis, and international advocacy on behalf of political prisoners, journalists, and activists at risk.

Her work engages international accountability mechanisms, including UN special procedures, treaty bodies, and regional institutions, and supports strategic litigation and asylum cases involving victims of state persecution. Seiitbek regularly collaborates with international human rights organizations, investigative journalists, and policy actors to expose systemic abuses and kleptocratic governance structures.

She is a frequent commentator and author on human rights violations in Eurasia and advocates for victim-centered accountability, protection of civic space, and international responsibility in responding to authoritarian repression.

== Education ==
Leila received her degree in law at the Kyrgyz State Law Academy.

== Career ==
Leila founded Blago, a public foundation, in 2012. When Leila worked to help Kyrgyz citizens track down vanished funds that were supposed to secure housing plots near Bishkek, she uncovered a corruption scheme that involved influential Kyrgyz officials. Because of her work as a human rights activist, she became the target of a smear campaign and a kidnapping attack launched by Kyrgyz authorities and was forced to flee Kyrgyzstan.

Leila received asylum in Austria after facing politically motivated charges

She has been actively involved in monitoring and addressing human rights violations in the region, with a particular focus on women's rights and violence against women and girls, political repression, issues related to post-Soviet kleptocracy and organized crime. Seiitbek has been vocal about the increasing trend of women political prisoners and a strong advocate for transparency, democracy, and the protection of civil liberties in Central Asia. Her work has drawn attention to the challenges faced by activists and the impact of government crackdowns on dissent in the region. Additionally, she has been involved in legal efforts to challenge the fabrication of criminal charges, transnational repression, political persecution, discrimination and persecution of ethnic minorities and right to asylum.

=== Fabrication of criminal charges ===
Leila regularly provided pro bono legal assistance in Kyrgyzstan. As part of this work, Leila consulted a Coalition of Citizens for Affordable housing who were defrauded by Kyrgyz officials. She shared her findings with investigative reporters at Kloop.kg. In 2015, along with Kloop.kg, she made public a series of facts about land frauds involving high-ranking officials from the then ruling party. Throughout 2015 and early 2016, Kyrgyz security services and police subjected Leila to harassment and intimidation. She was targeted in an aggressive smear campaign through government-controlled media outlets. On April 5, 2016, the Kyrgyz authorities aired a news program on state TV channel where they named Leila and her husband "fraudsters” and American agents. As a result, Leila and her family were forced to leave Kyrgyzstan. Also in 2016, authorities fabricated criminal cases against Leila and her husband under the Kyrgyzstan Criminal Code's Articles 166 (“fraud”) and 171 (“appropriation and embezzlement of entrusted property”) - charges often used against human rights defendners and journalists to slander them and justify and legitimize repressive actions against them by portraying them as common criminals.

=== Women’s rights advocacy ===
Leila is a women's rights advocate. She focuses on gender discrimination and violence against women and girls in Central Asia. Leila is a 1000 Voices Fellow and a member of the Every Woman Coalition along with Najla Ayoubi, an Afghan women's rights defender, lawyer, and former judge and Lisa Shannon, an American author, human rights activist. In 2022, she brought to light a case of intimate partner violence in Uzbekistan, in which a man hit his wife on the day of their wedding in front of guests.

=== Anti-corruption and anti-kleptocracy advocacy ===
Leila works as an anti–corruption activist and addresses issues concerning post-Soviet kleptocracy and organized crime. Within her non profit Freedom for Eurasia, Leila conducts research on Central Asian and post-Soviet kleptocracies and their impact on Western democracies. One of their major reports was Who Enabled the Uzbek Princess, which was launched in 2024 which discusses the service provider who facilitate post-Soviet kleptocrats efforts to store their wealth in the West. She participates in a number of coalitions that work on these issues, including the Uzbek Asset Return Network, that tracks down assets received by members of corrupt Uzbek elites, Human Rights Impact Hub, a platform that provides complementary capacity-building, networking and knowledge-sharing tools on universal jurisdiction, targeted sanctions, and climate justice to equip lawyers with the necessary practical skills to engage in innovative litigation strategies run by International Partnership for Human Rights. She cooperated with Global Initiative against Transnational Organized Crime (GI-TOC), and The Global Anti-Corruption Consortium (GACC) where she conducted research on Eurasian organised crime and corruption. Seiitbek's organization, Freedom For Eurasia, has been at the forefront of advocating for human rights and democracy in Central Asia. The organization has been instrumental in bringing attention to the growing threat of kleptocracies and the need of more active use of sanctions against human righths and corruption abusers in Central Asia.
