= Stoning =

Method of capital punishment

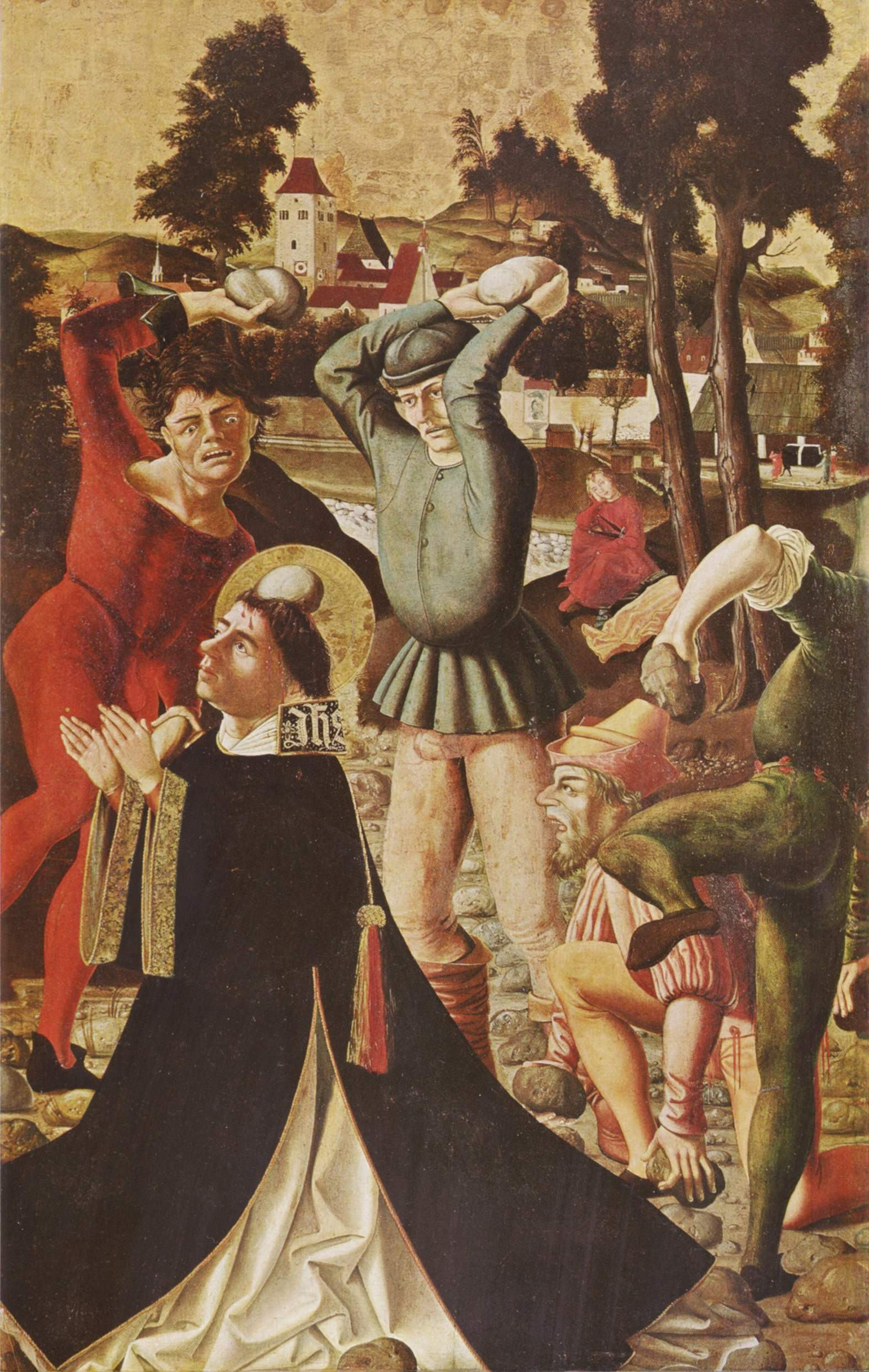
Saint Stephen, first martyr of Christianity, painted in 1506 by Marx Reichlich (1460–1520) (Pinakothek of Munich)

Stoning, or lapidation, is a method of capital punishment where a group throws stones at a person until the subject dies from blunt trauma. It has been attested as a form of punishment for grave misdeeds since ancient times.

Stoning appears to have been the standard method of capital punishment in ancient Israel. Its use is attested in the early Christian era, but Jewish courts generally avoided stoning sentences in later times. Only a few isolated instances of legal stoning are recorded in pre-modern history of the Islamic world. In recent decades several states have inserted stoning and other hudud (pl. of hadd) punishments into their penal codes under the influence of Islamist movements. These laws hold particular importance for religious conservatives due to their scriptural origin, though in practice they have played a largely symbolic role and tended to fall into disuse.

The Torah and Talmud prescribe stoning as punishment for a number of offenses. Over the centuries, Rabbinic Judaism developed a number of procedural constraints which made these laws practically unenforceable. Although stoning is not mentioned in the Quran, classical Islamic jurisprudence (fiqh) imposed stoning as a hadd (sharia-prescribed) punishment for certain forms of zina (illicit sexual intercourse) on the basis of hadith (sayings and actions attributed to the Islamic prophet Muhammad). It also developed a number of procedural requirements which made zina difficult to prove in practice.

In recent times, stoning has been a legal or customary punishment in Iran, the United Arab Emirates, Qatar, Mauritania, Saudi Arabia, Sudan, Yemen, northern Nigeria, Afghanistan, Brunei, and tribal parts of Pakistan, including the northwest Kurram Valley and the northwest Khwezai-Baezai region though it is rarely carried out. In some of these countries, including Afghanistan, it has been carried out extrajudicially by militants, tribal leaders, and others. In some other countries, including Nigeria and Pakistan, although stoning is a legal form of punishment, it has never been legally carried out. Stoning is condemned by human rights organizations.

== History ==
Stoning is attested in the Near East since ancient times as a form of capital punishment for grave sins. However stoning as a practice was not geographically limited to only the Near East, and there is significant historical record of stoning being employed among the Greeks and Romans as well. The ancient geographer Pausanias describes both the elder and younger Aristocrates of Orchomenus being stoned to death in ancient Greece around the 7th century BCE.

Stoning was "presumably" the standard form of capital punishment in ancient Israel. It is attested in the Old Testament as a punishment for blasphemy, idolatry and other crimes, in which the entire community pelted the offender with stones outside a city. The death of Stephen, as reported in the New Testament (Acts 7:58) was also organized in this way. Paul was stoned and left for dead in Lystra (Acts 14:19). Josephus and Eusebius report that Pharisees stoned James, brother of Jesus, after hurling him from the pinnacle of the Temple shortly before the fall of Jerusalem in 70 CE. Historians disagree as to whether Roman authorities allowed Jewish communities to apply capital punishment to those who broke religious laws, or whether these episodes represented a form of lynching. During the Late Antiquity, the tendency of not applying the death penalty at all became predominant in Jewish courts. Where medieval Jewish courts had the power to pass and execute death sentences, they continued to do so for particularly grave offenses, although not necessarily the ones defined by the law, and they generally refrained from use of stoning.

Aside from "a few rare and isolated" instances from the pre-modern era and several recent cases, there is no historical record of stoning for zina being legally carried out in the Islamic world. In the modern era, sharia-based criminal laws have been widely replaced by statutes inspired by European models. However, the Islamic revival of the late 20th century brought along the emergence of Islamist movements calling for full implementation of sharia, including reinstatement of stoning and other hudud punishments. A number of factors have contributed to the rise of these movements, including the failure of authoritarian secular regimes to meet the expectations of their citizens, and a desire of Muslim populations to return to more culturally authentic forms of socio-political organization in the face of a perceived cultural invasion from the West. Supporters of sharia-based legal reforms felt that "Western law" had its chance to bring development and justice, and hoped that a return to Islamic law would produce better results. They also hoped that introduction of harsh penalties would put an end to crime and social problems.

In practice, Islamization campaigns have focused on a few highly visible issues associated with the conservative Muslim identity, particularly women's hijab and the hudud criminal punishments (whipping, stoning and amputation) prescribed for certain crimes. For many Islamists, hudud punishments are at the core of the divine sharia because they are specified by the letter of scripture rather than by human interpreters. Modern Islamists have often rejected, at least in theory, the stringent procedural constraints developed by classical jurists to restrict their application. Several countries, including Iran, Pakistan, Sudan, and some Nigerian states have incorporated hudud rules into their criminal justice systems, which, however, retained fundamental influences of earlier Westernizing reforms. In practice, these changes were largely symbolic, and aside from some cases brought to trial to demonstrate that the new rules were being enforced, hudud punishments tended to fall into disuse, sometimes to be revived depending on the local political climate. The supreme courts of Sudan and Iran have rarely approved verdicts of stoning or amputation, and the supreme courts of Pakistan and Nigeria have never done so.

Unlike other countries, where stoning was introduced into state law as part of recent reforms, Saudi Arabia has never adopted a criminal code and Saudi judges still follow traditional Hanbali jurisprudence. Death sentences in Saudi Arabia are pronounced almost exclusively based on the system of judicial sentencing discretion (tazir) rather than sharia-prescribed (hudud) punishments, following the classical principle that hudud penalties should be avoided if possible.

In China, stoning was one of the many methods of killing carried out during the Cultural Revolution, including the Guangxi Massacre.

== Religious scripture and law ==
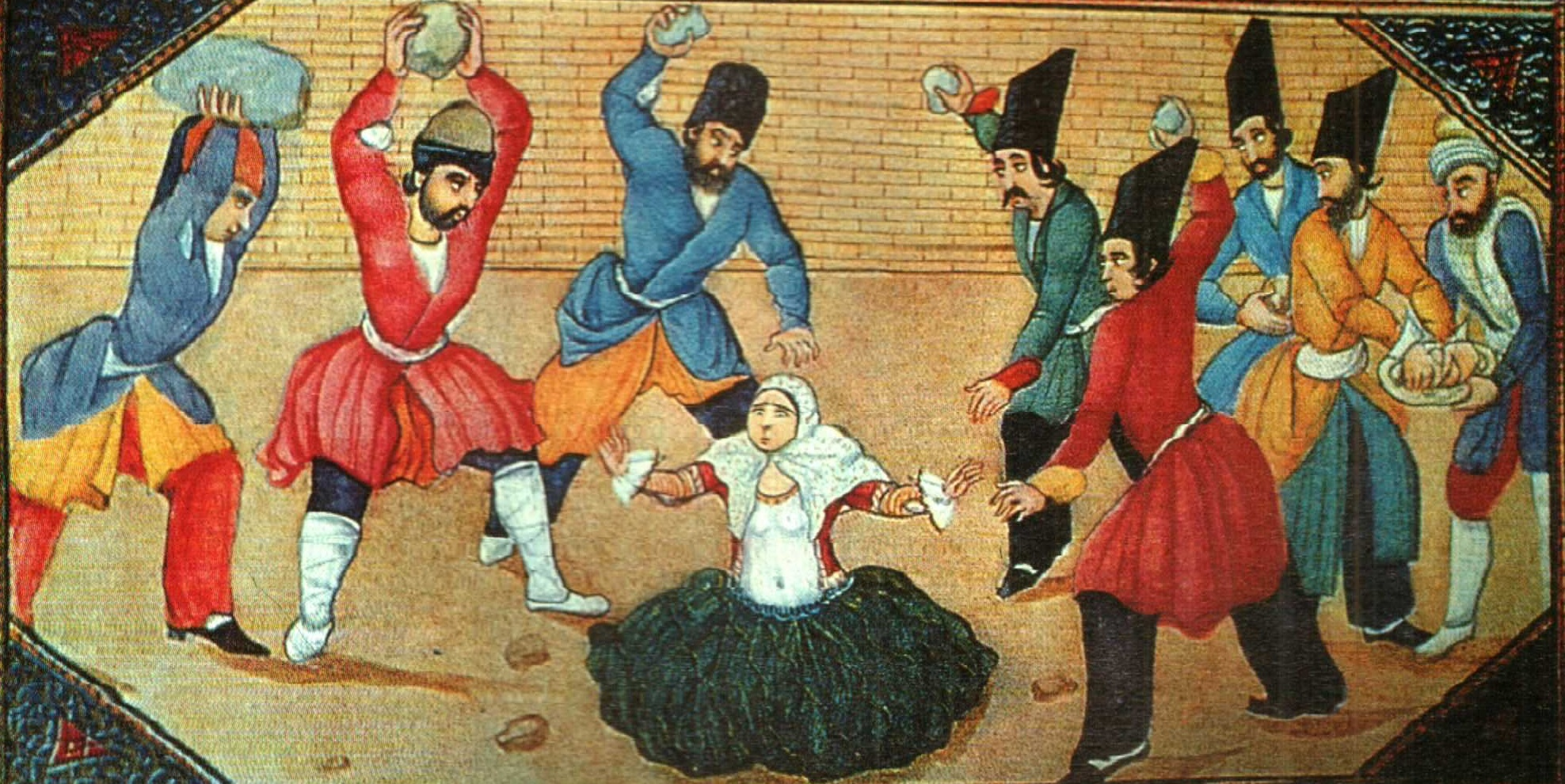
The Stoning of an Adulteress, illustration to a manuscript of 1001 Nights by Abu'l Hasan Ghaffari or his atelier. Tehran, 1853–1857.

=== Judaism ===
==== Torah ====
The Jewish Torah (the first five books of the Hebrew Bible: Genesis, Exodus, Leviticus, Numbers, and Deuteronomy) serves as a common religious reference for Judaism. Stoning is the method of execution mentioned most frequently in the Torah. (Murder is not mentioned as an offense punishable by stoning, but it seems that a member of the victim's family was allowed to kill the murderer; see avenger of blood.)

==== Mode of judgment ====
In rabbinic law, capital punishment may be inflicted by only the verdict of a regularly constituted court of twenty-three qualified members. There must be the most trustworthy and convincing testimony of at least two qualified eyewitnesses to the crime, who must also depose that the culprit had been forewarned of the criminality and the consequences of such a project. The culprit must be a person of legal age and of sound mind, and the crime must be proved to have been committed of the culprit's free will and without the aid of others.

In the Talmud, the specific method of stoning (known as sekilah) involved throwing the condemned person off a height, typically twice the height of an average person, so that they would fall to the ground. If the fall did not result in death, a large stone would be dropped on the person's chest. If this still did not cause death, bystanders would then continue to hurl stones until the person was dead.

=== Christianity ===
==== New Testament ====
In John 7:53–8:11, Jesus saves a woman accused of committing adultery from being stoned to death by challenging her accusers that the one who is without sin should cast the first stone at her. This causes her accusers to depart as they realize that not one of them is without sin. Jesus then tells the woman that he too does not condemn her and instructs her to go and sin no more.

=== Islam ===
Under Islamic sharia law stoning is the prescribed punishment for adultery in public, requiring at least four witnesses to the sexual act, based on the Quran and the hadith as primary sources. While stoning is not mentioned as a form of capital punishment in the canonical text of the Quran, it is prescribed in various hadiths.

== Contemporary legal status and use ==
A map showing countries where public stoning is a judicial or extrajudicial form of punishment, as of 2020.

Countries that retain a provision for the punishment of stoning in their laws: Afghanistan, Brunei, Iran, Iraq, Nigeria, Pakistan, Saudi Arabia, Sudan, Somalia, Yemen, and, until 2020, the United Arab Emirates.

Countries in which stonings have recently been carried out: Afghanistan, Iran, Iraq, Somalia, Nigeria, Pakistan.

=== Afghanistan ===
Stoning has been reinstated as a form of punishment after the Taliban regained power in 2021. In 2023, the Taliban reaffirmed their commitment to administering the death penalty by stoning, focusing in their message especially on the punishment of women for the crime of adultery. There have been reports of the Taliban stoning women to death.

Before the Taliban government, most areas of Afghanistan, aside from the capital, Kabul, were controlled by warlords or tribal leaders. The Afghan legal system depended highly on an individual community's local culture and the political or religious ideology of its leaders. Stoning also occurred in lawless areas, where vigilantes committed the act for political purposes. Once the Taliban took over in 1996, it became a form of punishment for certain serious crimes or adultery. After the fall of the Taliban government, the Karzai administration re-enforced the 1976 penal code which made no provision for the use of stoning as a punishment. In 2013, the Ministry of Justice proposed public stoning as punishment for adultery. However, the government had to back down from the proposal after it was leaked and triggered international outcry.

=== Brunei ===
In 2019, Brunei implemented a new Sharia Penal Code which includes a mandatory death penalty by stoning for many crimes. However, the Sultan has declared that Brunei's de facto moratorium on the death penalty would apply to this law as well. Brunei has not carried out any executions since 1957.

=== Iran ===
Iran's penal code contains stoning as a possible form of punishment and allows punishment to be based on fiqh (traditional Islamic jurisprudence), which includes provisions for stoning. Although the Iranian judiciary officially placed a moratorium on stoning in 2002, various instances of stonings in Iran have been documented since then. In 2013, the spokesman for the Iranian Parliament's Justice Commission confirmed that while the Penal Code no longer prescribes stoning, it remains a valid punishment under sharia, which is enforceable under the Penal Code.

In 2009, two people were stoned to death in Mashhad, Razavi Khorasan Province as punishment for the crime of adultery.

The most known case in Iran was the stoning of Soraya Manutchehri in 1986.

Methods

In the 2008 version of the Islamic Penal Code of Iran detailed how stoning punishments are to be carried out for adultery, and even hints in some contexts that the punishment may allow for its victims to avoid death:

Article 102 – An adulterous man shall be buried in a ditch up to near his waist and an adulterous woman up to near her chest and then stoned to death.

Article 103 – In case the person sentenced to stoning escapes the ditch in which they are buried, then if the adultery is proven by testimony then they will be returned for the punishment but if it is proven by their own confession then they will not be returned.

Article 104 – The size of the stone used in stoning shall not be too large to kill the convict by one or two throws and at the same time shall not be too small to be called a stone.

Depending upon the details of the case, the stoning may be initiated by the judge overseeing the matter or by one of the original witnesses to the adultery. Certain religious procedures may also need to be followed both before and after the implementation of a stoning execution, such as wrapping the person being stoned in traditional burial dress before the procedure.

The method of stoning set out in the 2008 code was similar to that in a 1999 version of Iran's penal code. Iran revised its penal code in 2013. The new code does not include the above passages, but does include stoning as a hadd punishment. For example, Book I, Part III, Chapter 5, Article 132 of the new Islamic Penal Code (IPC) of 2013 in the Islamic Republic of Iran states, "If a man and a woman commit zina together more than one time, if the death penalty and flogging or stoning and flogging are imposed, only the death penalty or stoning, whichever is applicable, shall be executed". Book 2, Part II, Chapter 1, Article 225 of the Iran's IPC released in 2013 states, "the hadd punishment for zina of a man and a woman who meet the conditions of ihsan shall be stoning to death".

=== Indonesia ===
The province of Aceh in Indonesia enforces some provisions of Islamic criminal law. In 2009, the Aceh provincial parliament proposed a new criminal code that included stoning for adultery, but this was vetoed by the Governor. In 2014, a new version of the law was passed which does not contain the stoning provision for adultery.

=== Iraq ===
In Iraq, various groups of people have used stoning as a form of punishment in recent times.

Yazidis: In 2007, Du'a Khalil Aswad, a Yazidi girl, was stoned by her fellow tribesmen in northern Iraq causing large scale protests and retaliatory attacks by militant Muslims due to conflicting reports that she had been Stoned because she had converted to Islam.

Shi'ite militants: In 2012 at least 14 youths were stoned to death in Baghdad, apparently as part of a Shi'ite militant campaign against Western-style "emo" fashion. It was followed by condemnation by Shiite scholars.

Islamic State militants: An Iraqi man was stoned to death by IS, in August 2014, in the northern city of Mosul after one Sunni Islamic court sentenced him to die for the crime of adultery.

=== Nigeria ===
Since the sharia legal system was introduced in the predominantly Muslim north of Nigeria in 2000, more than a dozen Nigerian Muslims have been sentenced to death by stoning for sexual offences ranging from adultery to homosexuality. However, none of these sentences have actually been carried out. They have either been thrown out on appeal, commuted to prison terms or left unenforced, in part as a result of pressure from human rights groups.

Although the Nigerian state has so far not carried out any stonings, the Muslim population in northern Nigeria has taken the enforcement of Sharia law into their own hands through mob killings of alleged blasphemers.

In 2023 a butcher was stoned to death by a mob in Sokoto, which included children throwing rocks. A devout Muslim himself, he reportedly argued with a beggar that she should seek alms in the name of Allah rather than the Prophet Muhammad, in reference to Hadith 1723. Other traders interpreted his comments as blasphemous.

In 2022, a Christian student in Sokoto was accused of blasphemy and then beaten to death by a mob of students throwing sticks and stones at her before setting her on fire.

=== Pakistan ===
As part of Zia-ul-Haq's Islamization measures, stoning to death (rajm) at a public place was introduced into law via the 1979 Hudood Ordinances as punishment for adultery (zina) and rape (zina-bil-jabr) when committed by a married person. However, stoning has never been officially utilized since the law came into effect and all judicial executions occur by hanging. The first conviction and sentence of stoning in September 1981 was overturned under national and international pressure. Another conviction for adultery and sentence of stoning in early 1988 sparked outrage and led to a retrial and acquittal by the Federal Sharia Court. In this case the trial court took the view that notice of divorce by the defendant's former husband should have been given to the Chairman of the local council, as stipulated under Section-7(3) of the Muslim Family Laws Ordinance, 1961. This section states that any man who divorces his wife must register it with the Union Council. Otherwise, the court concluded that the divorce stood invalidated and the couple became liable to conviction under the Adultery ordinance. In 2006, the ordinances providing for stoning in the case of adultery or rape were legislatively demoted from overriding status.

Extrajudicial stonings in Pakistan have been known to happen in recent times. In March 2013, a Pakistani soldier stationed in Parachinar, was publicly stoned to death for allegedly having a love affair with a girl from a village in the country's north western Kurram Agency. On 11 July 2013 a young mother of two, was sentenced by a tribal court in Dera Ghazi Khan District, in Punjab, to be stoned to death for possessing a cell phone. Members of her family were ordered to execute her sentence and her body was buried in the desert far away from her village.

In February 2014, a couple in a remote area of Baluchistan province was stoned to death after being accused of an adulterous relationship. On 27 May 2014, Farzana Parveen, a 25-year-old married woman who was three months pregnant, was killed by being attacked with batons and bricks by nearly 20 members of her family outside the high court of Lahore in front of "a crowd of onlookers" according to a statement by a police investigator. The assailants, who allegedly included her father and brothers, attacked her and her husband with batons and bricks. Her father, who was arrested for murder, reportedly called the murder an "honor killing" and said "I killed my daughter as she had insulted all of our family by marrying a man without our consent." The man told a news agency that he had strangled his previous wife in order to marry his seconds wife, and police said that he had been released for killing his first wife because a "compromise" had been reached with his family.

=== Saudi Arabia ===
Legal stoning sentences have been reported in Saudi Arabia. There were four cases of execution by stoning reported between 1981 and 1992, but nothing since.

=== Sudan ===
In Sudan, stoning is an obligatory sentence for certain crimes under the Sudanese Criminal Act of 1991. In 2019, a Transitional Military Council signed a Constitutional Declaration which contains a chapter on rights and freedoms for Sudanese citizens that declares no one shall be subject to torture, humiliation, or ill-treatment. However, the 1991 law is still in effect, and in June 2022, the Kosti Criminal Court sentenced a 20-year-old woman to death by stoning for adultery. The court of appeals overturned this sentence due to the lack of implementation of fair trial standards and returned the case for judicial review to the first-instance court.

=== Somalia ===
In October 2008, a 13-year-old girl, Aisha Ibrahim Duhulow, reported being gang-raped by three armed men to the local al-Shabaab militia-dominated police force in Kismayo, a city that was controlled Islamist insurgents. The insurgents claimed that Aisha had committed adultery by seducing the men, and went on to allege that she was 23 years of age (a claim disproven by both Aisha's father and aunt) and that she had expressly stated she wanted sharia law to be applied in her sentencing, thus theoretically justifying the capital punishment of stoning. However, numerous witnesses have reported that in actuality Aisha had been visibly confused, crying, begging for mercy, and was physically forced into the hole in which she was buried up to her neck and stoned.

In September 2014, al-Shabaab militants stoned a woman to death, after she was declared guilty of adultery by an informal court.

=== United Arab Emirates ===
Since 2020, stoning is no longer a legal form of punishment following an amendment to the Federal Penal Code. Before 2020, stoning was the default method of execution for adultery, and several people were sentenced to death by stoning, though none of the sentences were carried out.

=== Islamic State ===
Several adultery executions by stoning committed by IS were reported in the autumn of 2014. The Islamic State's magazine, Dabiq, documented the stoning of a woman in Raqqa as a punishment for adultery.

In October 2014, IS released a video appearing to show a Syrian man stone his daughter to death for alleged adultery.

=== Other countries ===
In Guatemala, mob lynching has become a common form of vigilante justice, and is considered a legacy of the civil war. In 2000, in the Guatemalan town of Todos Santos Cuchumatán, a bus driver and a Japanese tourist were stoned to death by a mob due to rumors that foreign tourists intend to kidnap Guatemalan children. In 2021, a mob of more than 600 villagers in Honduras accused an Italian tourist of murdering a homeless man and stoned him to death.

== Views ==
=== Support ===
==== Among Muslims ====
A survey conducted by the Pew Research Center in 2013 found varying support in the global Muslim population for stoning as a punishment for adultery (sex between people where at least one person is married; when both participants are unmarried they get 100 lashes). Highest support for stoning is found in Muslims of the Middle East-North Africa region and South-Asian countries while generally less support is found in Muslims living in the Mediterranean and Central Asian countries. Support is consistently higher in Muslims who want Sharia to be the law of the land than in Muslims who do not want Sharia. Support for stoning in various countries is as follows:

South Asia:

Pakistan (86% in all Muslims, 89% in Muslims who say Sharia should be the law of the land), Afghanistan (84% in all Muslims, 85% in Muslims who say Sharia should be the law of the land), Bangladesh (54% in all Muslims, 55% in Muslims who say Sharia should be the law of the land)

Middle East-North Africa:

Palestinian territories (81% in all Muslims, 84% in Muslims who say Sharia should be the law of the land), Egypt (80% in all Muslims, 81% in Muslims who say Sharia should be the law of the land), Jordan (65% in all Muslims, 67% in Muslims who say Sharia should be the law of the land), Iraq (57% in all Muslims, 58% in Muslims who say Sharia should be the law of the land)

Southeast Asia:

Malaysia (54% in all Muslims, 60% in Muslims who say Sharia should be the law of the land), Indonesia (42% in all Muslims, 48% in Muslims who say Sharia should be the law of the land), Thailand (44% in all Muslims, 51% in Muslims who say Sharia should be the law of the land)

Sub-Saharan Africa:

Niger (70% in all Muslims), Djibouti (67%), Mali (58%), Senegal (58%), Guinea Bissau (54%), Tanzania (45%), Ghana (42%), DR Congo (39%), Cameroon (36%), Nigeria (33%)

Central Asia:

Kyrgyzstan (26% in all Muslims, 39% in Muslims who say Sharia should be the law of the land), Tajikistan (25% in all Muslims, 51% in Muslims who say Sharia should be the law of the land), Azerbaijan (16%), Turkey (9% in all Muslims, 29% in Muslims who say Sharia should be the law of the land)

Southern and Eastern Europe:

Russia (13% in all Muslims, 26% in Muslims who say sharia should be the law of the land), Kosovo (9% in all Muslims, 25% in Muslims who say Sharia should be the law of the land), Albania (6% in all Muslims, 25% in Muslims who say Sharia should be the law of the land), Bosnia (6% in all Muslims, 21% in Muslims who say Sharia should be the law of the land)

Places where substantial numbers of Muslims did not answer the survey's question or are undecided about whether they support stoning for adultery include Malaysia (19% of all Muslims), Kosovo (18%), Iraq (14%), Democratic Republic of the Congo (12%) and Tajikistan (10%).

=== Opposition ===
The Catholic Church condemns stoning, calling it "a particularly brutal form of capital punishment." Stoning has been condemned by several human rights organizations. Some groups, such as Amnesty International and Human Rights Watch, oppose all capital punishment, including stoning. Other groups, such as RAWA (Revolutionary Association of the Women of Afghanistan), or the International Committee against Stoning (ICAS), oppose stoning per se as an especially cruel practice.

Specific sentences of stoning, such as the Amina Lawal case, have often generated international protest. Groups such as Human Rights Watch, while in sympathy with these protests, have raised a concern that the Western focus on stoning as an especially "exotic" or "barbaric" act distracts from what they view as the larger problems of capital punishment. They argue that the "more fundamental human rights issue in Nigeria is the dysfunctional justice system."

In Iran, the ‘Stop Stoning Forever Campaign’ was formed by various women's rights activists after a man and a woman were stoned to death in Mashhad in May 2006. The campaign's main goal is to legally abolish stoning as a form of punishment for adultery in Iran.

== Human rights ==
Stoning is considered a form of torture under the definition of the United Nations Convention Against Torture. To apply the punishment of stoning is a violation of the human right against torture, defined in Article 5 of the Universal Declaration of Human Rights.

=== Women's rights ===
Stoning has been condemned as a violation of women's rights and a form of discrimination against women. Although stoning is also applied to men, the vast majority of the victims are reported to be women. According to the international group Women Living Under Muslim Laws stoning "is one of the most brutal forms of violence perpetrated against women in order to control and punish their sexuality and basic freedoms".

Amnesty International has argued that the reasons for which women suffer disproportionately from stoning include the fact that women are not treated equally and fairly by the courts; the fact that, being more likely to be illiterate than men, women are more likely to sign confessions to crimes which they did not commit; and the fact that general discrimination against women in other life aspects leaves them at higher risk of convictions for adultery.

=== LGBT rights ===
Stoning also targets homosexuals and others who have same-sex relations in certain jurisdictions. In Mauritania, Northern Nigeria, Somalia, Saudi Arabia, Brunei, and Yemen, the legal punishment for sodomy is death by stoning.

=== Right to private life ===
Human rights organizations argue that many acts targeted by stoning should not be illegal in the first place, as outlawing them interferes with people's right to a private life. Amnesty International said that stoning deals with "acts which should never be criminalized in the first place, including consensual sexual relations between adults, and choosing one's religion".

== Examples ==
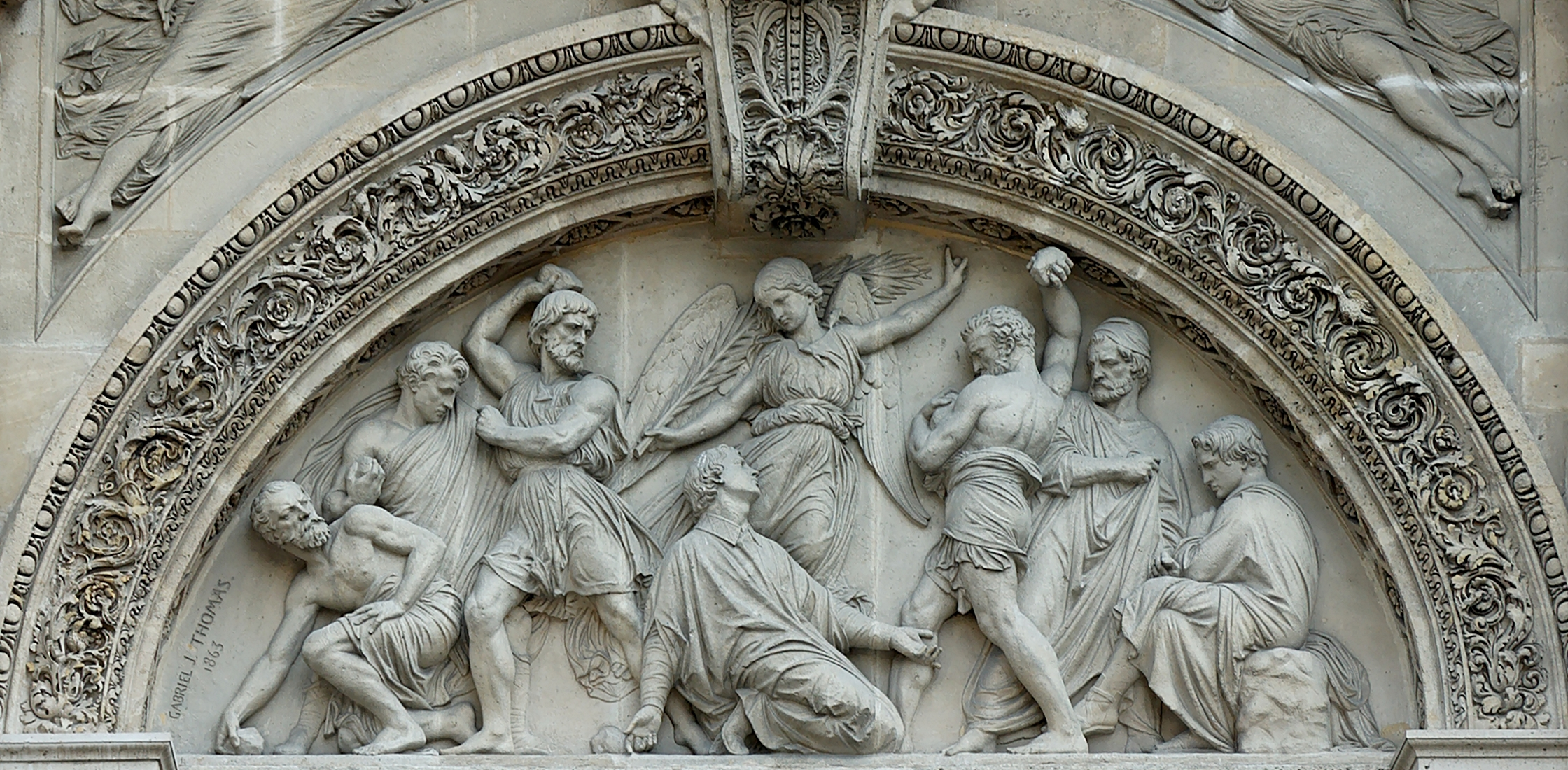
The stoning of Saint Stephen (1863) by Gabriel-Jules Thomas

=== Ancient ===
- Palamedes of Greek mythology, according to some sources stoned to death as a traitor.
- Lucius Appuleius Saturninus, d. 100 BC, grandfather of later triumvir Marcus Aemilius Lepidus
- Pancras of Taormina, about AD 40
- James the Just, in AD 62, after being condemned by the Sanhedrin
- Possibly Saint Timothy (by Hellenistic pagans), after AD 67
- Constantine-Silvanus, founder of the Paulicians, stoned in 684 in Armenia
- Chase (son of Ioube), Muslim Byzantine official of Arab origin, stoned in 915 at Athens
- Saint Eskil, Anglo-Saxon monk stoned to death by Swedish Vikings, about 1080
- Moctezuma II, 1520, last Aztec Emperor (according to Western accounts; whereas, according to Aztec accounts, the Spanish killed him.

==== Averted ====
- Xenophon mentions in his Anabasis, 4th century BCE, that several people are accused and suggested stoned, but averted, including Xenophon himself

=== Modern ===
- Soraya Manutchehri, 1986, a 35-year-old woman stoned to death in Iran after unconfirmed accusations of adultery
- Du'a Khalil Aswad, 2007, a 17-year-old girl stoned to death in Iraq

==== Averted ====
- Amina Lawal was sentenced to death by stoning in Nigeria in 2002 but freed on appeal.
- Sakineh Mohammadi Ashtiani was sentenced to death by stoning in Iran in 2006. Following a review the sentence was commuted and she was released in 2014.

== See also ==
- Shab Qadar Incident
- Stoning of the Devil
- Slut-shaming
- Honor killing
- Lynching

Related methods of execution

- Ishikozume (Japan)
- Crushing
- Cement shoes

Individuals

- Malak Ghorbany
- Amina Lawal
- Stoning of Du'a Khalil Aswad
