= International Leaders Programme =

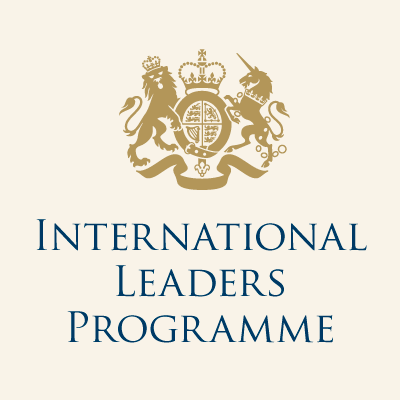
ILP Logo (circa 2013)

The International Leaders Programme (ILP) is an international leadership development and networking programme. The programme is organised and delivered by the Foreign, Commonwealth and Development Office of the Government of the United Kingdom. The ILP is not to be confused by programmes of a similar name provided by other organisations.

== Background ==
The ILP was established in March 2013 by former Foreign Secretary William Hague. It identifies potential global leaders of the future and brings them to the United Kingdom for high-level meetings, briefings, and diplomatic visits. The goal of the programme is to promote lasting global partnerships with emerging leaders and future decision-makers.

ILP participants have represented 100 countries, and the alumni has over 350 members to date.

== Notable participants ==
Participants in the programme have included:

- Ilwad Elman, Somalia
- Bogolo Kenewendo, Botswana
- Naheed Nenshi, Canada
