= Zakaria Hersi =

- Born: Somalia
- Occupation: Programmer
- Known for: Tech entrepreneur
- Spouse: Almaas Elman (m. 2017; died 2019)

Zakaria Hersi is a Swedish-Somali citizen, best known for his role in the development and propagation of Truecaller in Africa and Middle East.

== Personal life ==
Hersi's family left war-torn Somalia for Sweden when he was four years old. He grew up in Rissne.

Hersi spent 2015-2016 in Kenya, where he led and later sold a successful high-tech startup. He sold that firm in 2016 to return to Sweden when his mother fell ill.

In 2017 Hersi married Almaas Elman, a Canadian-Somali human-rights worker, who came from a family of prominent human rights workers. Elman was killed in Mogadishu, on November 20, 2019.

== Technical career ==
Hersi acquired his technical skills in Sweden. But he is best known as a job creator and tech ambassador, in Africa.

Digital Sweden has profiled his efforts to help other Swedish citizens from refugee backgrounds enter the fields of computers and technology. He founded a tech company, in Kenya, that employed 150 people within its first half year. More recently he has served as the African director of TrueCaller, which signed up its one millionth paid subscriber in 2019.
