= Almaas Elman =

Human rights activist (died 2019)

- Born: Somalia
- Died: 20 November 2019; Mogadishu
- Occupation: Humanitarian aid worker
- Spouse: Zakaria Hersi

Almaas Elman (died 20 November 2019) was a Somali-Canadian humanitarian aid worker, the eldest daughter of a prominent family of humanitarian aid-workers. Her parents were Elman Ali Ahmed and Fartuun Adan. She, her mother and her sisters emigrated to Canada in the early 1990s. Her father was gunned down in 1996. Her mother helped found the Elman Peace Center. One of her sisters Ilwad Elman was a short-listed candidate for the 2019 Nobel Peace Prize. Her husband, a Somali-Swedish tech entrepreneur, was Zakaria Hersi. They married in 2017.

Elman had served in the Canadian Armed Forces Reserve prior to her return to Somalia.

Elman had served as First Secretary, in the Somali embassy, in Kenya. Upon her return to Somalia Elman served as a liaison with diplomats from the European Union.

Canada's Minister of Families, Children and Social Development, Ahmed Hussen, called news of her death "personally devastating".

Elman's death was initially reported as a murder by many news sources, including The New York Times. Within a day of her death the African Union, which controls the territory where the car carrying her was traveling, said they had no reports of opposition elements engaging in hostilities in the area, and describes her being hit by "a stray bullet", from outside.

Hadalsame reported that Elman was expecting a child, when she was killed.

== See also ==
- Iman Elman - sister who serves in the Somali military
