= Iman Elman =

Somali-Canadian military officer (born 1992)

- Born: 1992 (age 33–34); Mogadishu, Somalia
- Occupation: Somali National Army Staff Officer

Iman Elman (born 1992) is a Somali-Canadian military officer. When she was a child, Elman's parents were peace advocates in wartorn Somalia. When the dangers of working in Somalia increased her parents agreed that her father, Elman Ali Ahmed would stay in Somalia, and continue to work for Peace, while her mother, Fartuun Adan would raise their daughters in Canada. When her daughters reached adult-hood Fartuun returned to Somalia, to renew her work for Peace. Iman's elder sisters, Almaas Elman and Ilwad Elman, also returned to Somalia, followed by Iman herself.

Almaas became a Somali diplomat, while Ilwad joined her mother at the Elman Peace and Human Rights Center. Iman, who had served in the Canadian reserves prior to her return to Somali, joined the Somali military.

== Military career ==
Iman joined the Somali military in 2011. She faced the assumption that her role in the military would be a support role, not active military duties, like going on military patrols. However she succeeded in working with male soldiers. By 2013, she had been promoted to lieutenant. By 2016, she was a captain, commanding a company-sized unit of male soldiers.

By 2020, Iman had been promoted to lieutenant colonel, and was serving as a staff officer with planning responsibilities.

Iman has survived being near the explosion of three roadside bombs.

Iman has brought child soldiers, found during military patrols she participated in, back to the Elman Peace Centre, for re-integration into the civilian world.

In August 2024, Iman had been promoted to colonel, and is serving as the Head of the Civil-Military Cooperation (CIMIC) Directorate.
