= Malak Ghorbany =

Shamemeh Malak Ghorbany (also known as Malek Ghorbani) is an Iranian woman, from the suburbs of the town of Naqdeh (province of west Azerbaijan) who was sentenced to death by stoning for allegedly having committed adultery. She is the mother of two children, a girl named Someyeh and a son, Ahmad.

Malak's brothers and husband murdered a man they found in her house, and to escape criminal responsibility for the murder, the men accused Malak of having an affair with the victim. Malak's brothers and husband also attacked Malak, and she, too, was nearly killed when they stabbed her. The attackers/murderers were legally found of having committed ‘legitimate’ murder and received a sentence of six years imprisonment.

In a letter to the court submitted by Malak's lawyer Mohammad Mostafaei during her first trial, Ghorbany is quoted as saying the following: “Since I am a rural, illiterate woman, I had no understanding or knowledge of the law. I thought that if I confessed to a relationship with the dead man, I would be able to clear my brothers and husband of intentional murder. I said the untrue words in court before realizing by doing so I would incriminate myself.”

On 28 June 2006, a court in the northwestern Iranian city of Urmia sentenced Malak Ghorbany to death by stoning for committing adultery. Under Iran's Penal Code, adultery committed by a married person carries the death penalty.

Ghorbany's case gained international attention when noted international human rights lawyer and activist, Lily Mazahery, launched a global campaign in support of her. In July 2006, various European and Asian rights organizations participated in coordinated demonstrations held outside Iran's embassies and consulate offices in different cities. In a number of public statements, the protesting organizations condemned stoning executions as a crime against humanity, demanded immediate and unconditional clemency for Malak Ghorbany, and called upon the Iranian regime to permanently ban stoning sentences.

According to an Amnesty International report: "In November 2006, [Iran's] Supreme Court ruled that the trial verdict was based on insufficient or incomplete evidence and overturned the sentence of execution by stoning. The case was returned to a lower court for a retrial. In late July or August 2008, the court ruled that Ghorbani should not be stoned to death, but instead she received a sentence of 100 lashes. She was released from prison in Urmia, where she had been held since 2005, but her sentence may still be implemented."

== References and notes ==
Specific references:
