= Caaqil Dheryodhoobe =

Siyaad Qaasim better known as Caaqil Dheryodhoobe was a famous warrior chief and leader of a Duduble subclan said to have lived over 8 generations ago or roughly 300 years ago (late 1600s till mid 1700s).

He was known for being a highly gifted and wise speaker with many stories originating about him.

In one legendary tale, after a devastating war in Nugaal with a Majeerteen subclan from Garowe, Caaqil Siyaad was compelled to pay blood money, but sent goats as compensation. Dismayed by the humiliating gesture as blood money was traditionally valued in camels, the chief gave the following haiku puzzle to explain his rationale.

Riyuhu laba raggay la wadaagaan, haarka iyo hareedka

Riyuhu laba naagahay la wadaagaan, labada naas iyo labo jileeca

Riyuhu laba geelay la wadaagaan, qatinka iyo qaroomaysiga

Riyuhu laba farda la wadaagaan, gooha iyo gurdanka

Riyuhu laba lo'day la wadaagaan, laba gees iyo labaca

After the contest was judged in his favour - though this new practise was not seen again - it was said Caaqil's subclan were cursed. Whilst curses are common among the tales of many clans who move away from areas of wars and drought, the town Mag Arile or Mag Ari with its famous tree can be found in the Nugaal region and some said to be nicknamed after the clan (Ciise Riyoole) who still live there today.

Ceelgaras, a district village in Galgaduud, is also named after Caaqil Siyaad Qaasim today.
