= Farah Abdullahi Abdi =

Transgender and migrant rights activist from Somalia, living in Malta

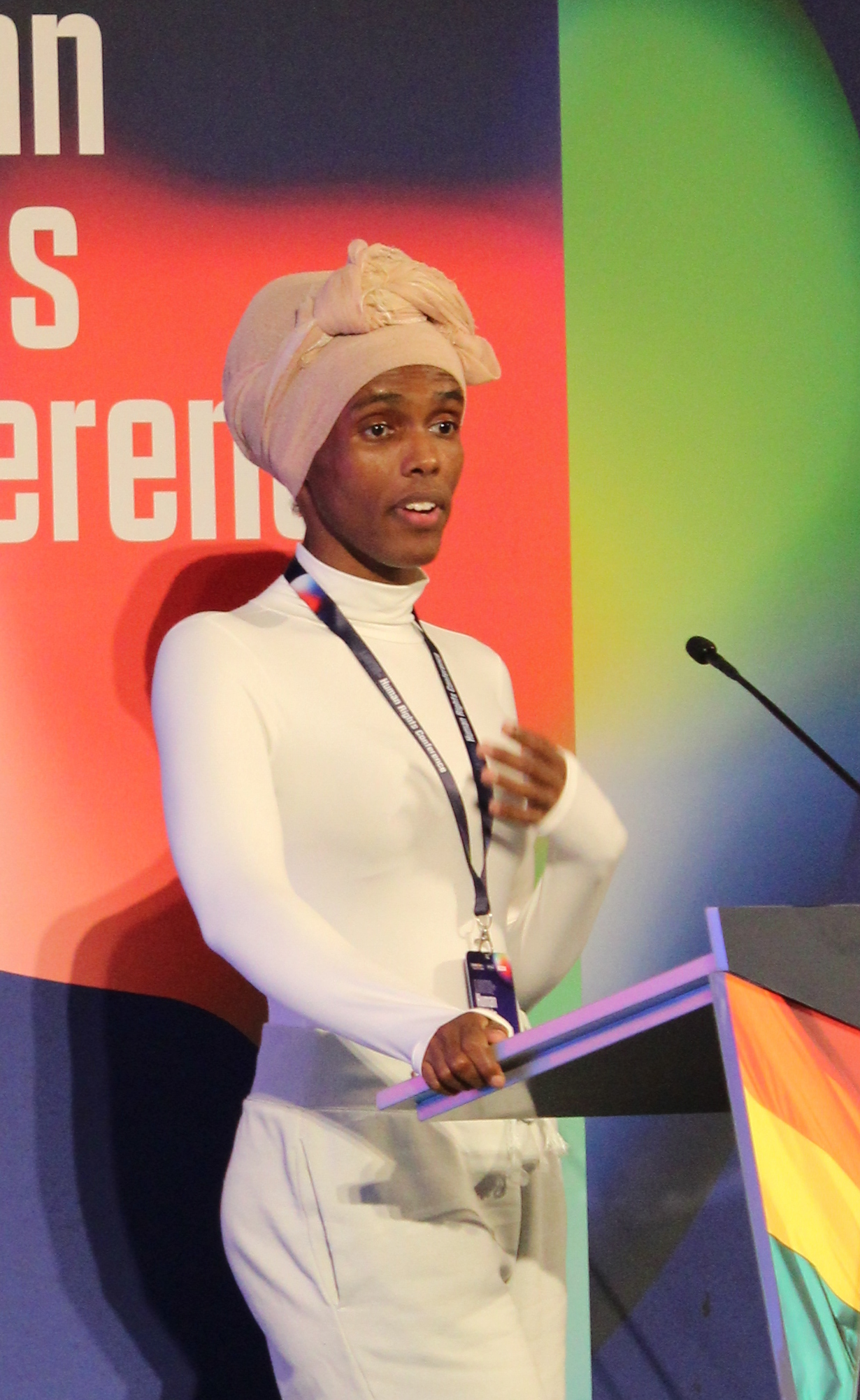
- Farah Abdullahi Abdi at Europride Malta
- Born: Beledweyne, Somalia
- Occupations: activist; journalist; blogger; spokesperson
- Years active: 2015–present

Farah Abdullahi Abdi is a human rights activist. She is a refugee from Somalia and a policy officer for asylum and migration at the organisation Transgender Europe.

== Early life and education ==
Farah fled from the war in Somalia with her parents and her brother at the age of three. Her family first stayed in a refugee camp but then moved to the capitol.

She then grew up in Nairobi, Kenya. Her father was a practicing Muslim. The family regularly prayed and read the Quran. Farah describes her parents as conservative and hardworking. She grew up middle class. She describes her mother and grandmother, who lived with the family in Nairobi, as fostering a strong sense of self-worth in her from an early age. Her parents gave her and her brother a good education. Farah grew up trilingual, speaking English and Swahili, as well as speaking Somali with her family at home. She had to hide her interest in music, American culture, fashion and acting from her family and later also her sexuality and gender identity.

Due to not being accepted for being gay and transgender, she fled at the age of 16 through Uganda, South Sudan, Sudan, and Libya to Malta. During the flight she was imprisoned five times, tortured, and abused, and was forced to work unpaid on construction sites in Libya. The cost of fleeing from Kenya to Malta was 12,000 US dollars for her family.

== Career and activism ==
=== Malta ===
Abdi arrived in Malta in 2012. She fled from Somalia via Libya and came to Malta by boat. Aged 16, Abdi was briefly detained after arriving in Malta despite her status as a minor. After a while, she opened up about being persecuted for her sexual and gender identity in her home country to a therapist and was released.

After her arrival, Abdi worked as an interpreter for local NGOs and at a restaurant in Senglea.

Abdi began working as a columnist for the Maltese newspaper Malta Today. She wrote about the mistreatment and plights of migrants in Malta and became known particularly among the migrant population of the island nation. Farah proclaimed they were there "to work and contribute to society". She was criticized for her outspokenness by people who were against immigration.

In 2014, Farah spoke in front of the European parliament with the support of the organization terre des hommes during the event "My destination is unknown" and advocated for the protection of minor and child refugees. European Commissioner Cecilia Malmström stated that it should be legally possible for child and minor refugees to migrate to the European Union.

She published an autobiography, Never Arrive, in 2015.

In 2023, Abdi spoke at the LGBTIQ+ Human Rights Conference, part of EuroPride.

=== Relocation to Berlin ===
Abdi later moved to Berlin, due to the racial discrimination she had faced in Malta.

In Berlin, Abdi currently works as an asylum and communications officer at the organization Transgender Europe. She is a fellow of the Alfred Landecker foundation for democracy, a fellow of the Torschreiber foundation for writers in exile and also received a "Digital Europe fellowship" for promoting democracy online.

== Awards ==
- International Bremen Peace Award by the German NGO, Schwelle
- the Queen of England award for young leaders
- Forbes 30 under 30 in Europe 2017

== Personal life ==
Abdi is a Muslim and a transgender woman.

== Publications ==
- Abdi, Farah Abdullahi (2015). Never Arrive. ISBN 9789995709006.
