= Capital punishment in Somalia =

Capital punishment is a legal criminal penalty in Somalia, a nation in East Africa. Legally sanctioned executions of the death penalty in Somalia are carried out by shooting, in accordance with the 1962 Somali Penal Code and the Military Penal Code. Sharia and Islamic tribunals are recognised in Somalia in parallel with the civil law: these would have the authority to order execution by other means, such as beheading and stoning. Since at least the start of the 21st century, all executions by such methods have been applied ad-hoc, without official sanction, by non-state insurgent militias, in the context of an unstable government, and the ongoing civil war in the country. A number of these extrajudicial executions have violated sharia legal principles and appear to have a conflict-related tactical aim of inciting fear amongst civilians. Both officially sanctioned and extrajudicial executions by firing squad often occur in public.

== Occurrences ==
In 2011 three soldiers were executed for murder by the Transitional Federal Government (TFG). The TFG had five executed in 2012, with a further person executed by Puntland authorities. Under the successor Federal Government of Somalia, another soldier was publicly executed by firing squad in 2013, one of 34 executions that year. He had been convicted by a military court in the shooting death of a student. In the wake of the high level of executions, the NGO Human Rights Watch noted in 2014 that not only were summary executions on the rise, but that military courts were inappropriately trying matters outside their jurisdiction. The number of death penalties rose again in 2015, with at least 28 carried out.

At least fourteen executions were carried out in 2016, and the rate of executions rose to 24 in 2017, which human rights groups mainly attributed to military courts and the insurgent jihadist group al-Shabaab. The European Union requested that Somalia enact a moratorium on the death penalty as a result.

The approximate numbers of executions that have occurred in Somalia, including in the semi-autonomous Puntland and self-declared independent Republic of Somaliland in the years 2018–2021 were reported by the Cornell Center. The numbers shown below are the minimum known executions, as there is uncertainty regarding whether all death penalties are recorded or disclosed:

- 2018 – At least thirteen sentences of death were completed; the military conducted several of these in public.
- 2019 – Thirteen, of which five occurred in Puntland.
- 2020 – Twenty reported executions. Five were undertaken by the Somali government. The semi-autonomous region of Puntland executed three; in the unrecognised independent Somaliland region, twelve were executed.
- 2021 – Total 22 executions, twenty-one in Puntland and one in Jubaland.

In 2022, the number of executions dropped sharply to six, a fall of 76 per cent compared to 2021. The number of death sentences passed on defendants during the year was approximately ten, down from at least 27 such sentences in 2021.

== See also ==
- Capital punishment in Islam – Overview of the death penalty in Islam
- Constitution of Somalia
- Xeer – Somali customary legal system
