= Tajikistan State University of Law, Business, & Politics =

Coordinates: 40°18′15.7″N 69°36′45.4″E

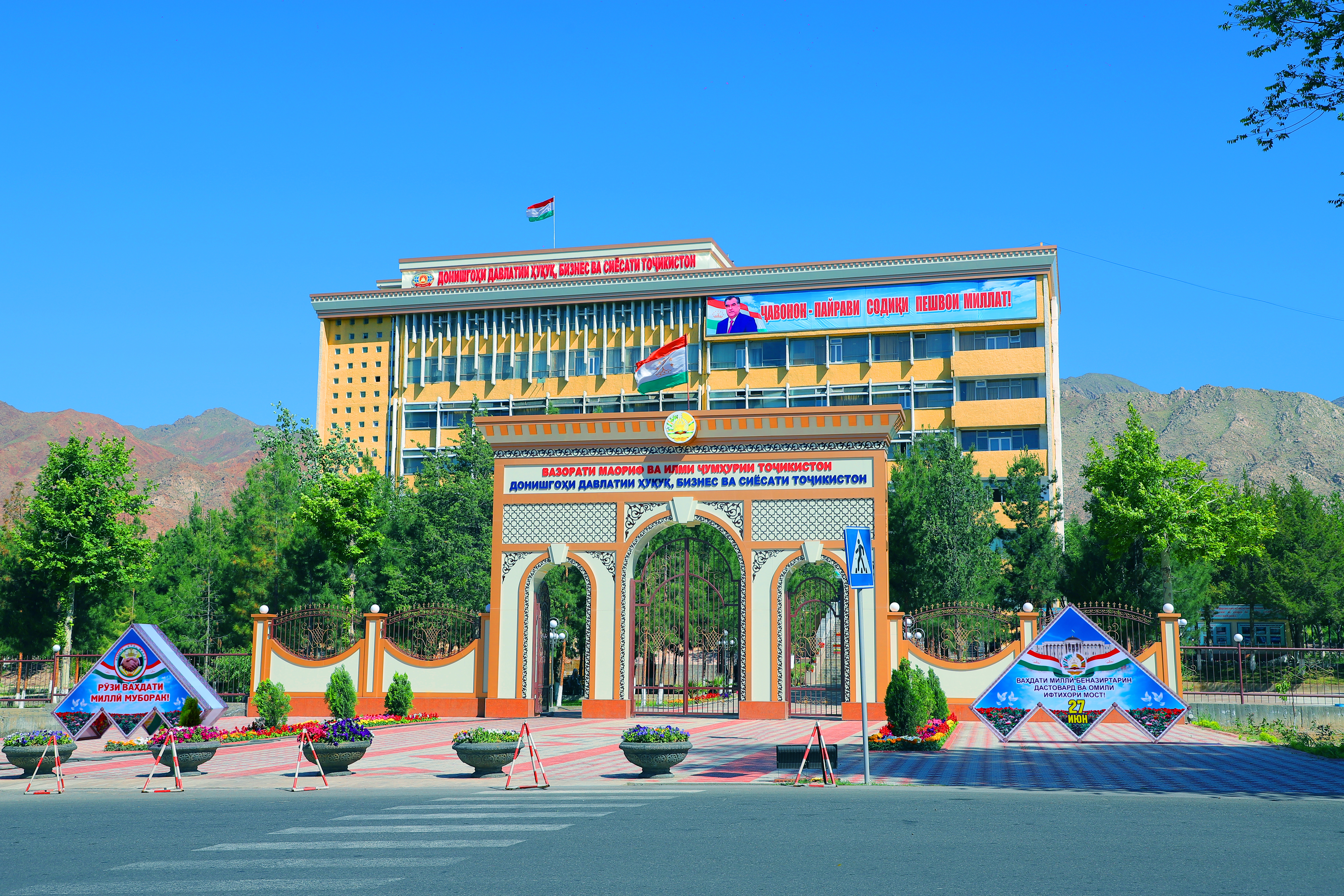
ДДХБСТ

Tajikistan State University of Law, Business, & Politics - TSULBP (Original: Донишгоҳи Давлатии Ҳуқуқ, Бизнес, ва Сиёсати Тоҷикистон - ДДҲБСТ) is one of several state-funded, five-year universities of higher education in the region of Sughd in Tajikistan. Located in Khujand, the school offers bachelor's and master's degrees as well as post-graduate education.

== History ==
Tajikistan State University of Law, Business and Politics was established on August 5, 1993 by the initiative and support of the Supreme Council of the Republic of Tajikistan.

== Campus setting ==
There are five buildings that are occupied by the university in different parts of the city. The main building of TSULBP is located on the 17th district of Khujand city. The university has its own library consisting of more than 350,000 books and a computer and internet equipped classroom.

== Academic organization ==
TSULBP offers four-year bachelor's and five-year master's degrees as well as post graduate courses in the fields of law, economics, political science, philosophy, history, and mathematics. In addition, TSULBP offers part-time courses.

The university is composed of the following faculties (schools):

- Faculty of Law
- Faculty of Business and management
- Faculty of Accounting and Tax
- Faculty of Finance
- Faculty of Politics and International Relations
- Faculty of Innovation and Telecommunications

== Accreditation ==
TSULBP is accredited by the Ministry of Education of the Republic of Tajikistan.
