= Najla Ayoubi =

Afghan women's rights defender, lawyer and judge

- Education: Tajikistan State University of Law, Business, & Politics; University of York
- Known for: First female judge in Parwan Province

Najla Ayoubi is an Afghan women's rights defender, lawyer, and former judge. She is the chief of Coalition and Global Programs at the Every Woman Coalition, a campaign for a new global treaty on violence against women and girls.

== Education ==
Najla completed her bachelor's degree in law in 1989. She has an MA in Law and Politics from Tajikistan State University of Law, Business, & Politics and an MA in Post-War Recovery and Development Studies from the University of York.

== Career ==
Najla was the first female judge in Parwan Province, Afghanistan. She held public interest legal positions in the government between 1988 and 2007 and participated in Afghanistan's constitution-making process from 2003 to 2004. She oversaw programmatic development and the creation of civic education material and workshops at the Constitution Commission Secretariat established under the Bonn Agreement in 2002. Najla worked for the Joint Electoral Management Body between 2004 and 2006, an Afghan-UN entity mandated by a presidential decree to manage and administer elections in Afghanistan. She served as the Head of Public Outreach and as a Commissioner from 2004 to 2006.

Najla also worked at Open Society Foundations as the Country Director for Afghanistan. In 2011, she worked at The Asia Foundation in Afghanistan as the Deputy Country Representative.

Najla was appointed as the 2015 Women Peacemaker at the Kroc Institute for Peace and Justice at the University of San Diego. She was also a Visiting Fellow at the University of Chicago Institute of Politics.

== Personal life ==
Najla and her family were targeted by extremists when she lived in Afghanistan. Najla's brother was murdered by the Hisb-e-Islami jihadi group and her father was killed for his liberal views in support of women's and human rights. After her father and brother were assassinated in the early nineties, Najla worked as a tailor and ran a tailoring school for 40 other young women who lost male family members. After credible threats were made on her life, she fled Afghanistan and sought asylum in the United States.

== Activism for Women’s Rights ==
Najla is a women's rights activist, with a focus on women's rights in Afghanistan. In 2022, she spoke at the UN during a high-level event on the human rights situation in Afghanistan and enhancing protection and security measures for women and girls.

== Awards ==
Najla was the recipient of the Women Peacemaker award at the University of San Diego Joan Kroc Institute for Peace and Justice in 2015. She was also included on #Femilist100 curated by The Gender Security Project in March 2021.
