= Elman Peace and Human Rights Center =

NGO based in Mogadishu, Somalia

The Elman Peace and Human Rights Center is a non-governmental organization based in Mogadishu, Somalia. It was established by Fartuun Adan in honour of her late husband Elman Ali Ahmed, a local entrepreneur and peace activist. Adan serves as the NGO's Executive Director, while their daughter Ilwad works alongside her. The organization was founded in 1990 and is dedicated to promoting peace, cultivating leadership and empowering the marginalized brackets of society to be decision makers in the processes that ensure their well-being.

Ilwad also helps run Sister Somalia, a subsidiary of the Elman Peace and Human Rights Center. The country's first program for assistance of victims of gender-based violence, it provides counseling, health and housing support for women in need. Elman's work has helped raise awareness locally on the issue, and encouraged changes in government policy. Ilwad has also carried out educational workshops through the center for vulnerable members of society, and designed and implemented projects promoting alternative livelihood opportunities for both young and old.

== Work ==
Elman Peace have programs are 100% free and priority is given to the most vulnerable members of the community. The programs include:

- Drop the Gun, Pick up the Pen
- Equal Voices
- Front Line Activist
- Job Creation
- Ocean Therapy
- She Will
- Sister Somalia
- Skills Training
