= Ilwad Elman =

Somali-Canadian social activist

- Ilwaad Elman
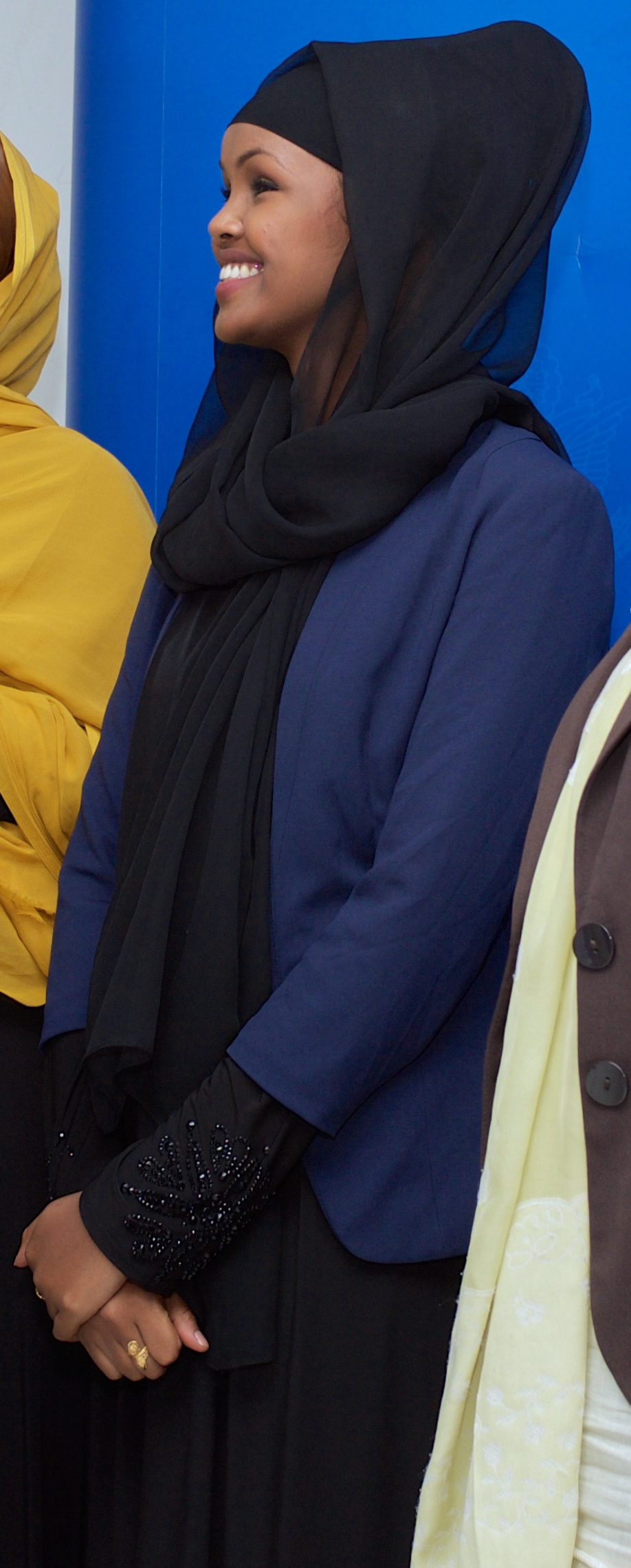
- Elman in 2015
- Born: 1988 or 1989 (age 36–37); Mogadishu, Somalia
- Occupation: Social Activist
- Parent(s): Elman Ali Ahmed and Fartuun Adan

Ilwad Elman (Somali: Ilwaad Elman) is a Somali-Canadian social activist. She works at the Elman Peace and Human Rights Center in Mogadishu alongside her mother Fartuun Adan, the NGO's founder. She was voted the African Young Personality (Female) of the Year during the 2016 Africa Youth Awards.

== Personal life ==
Ilwad was born between 1989 and 1990 in Mogadishu, Somalia. One of four daughters, she is the child of the late entrepreneur and peace activist Elman Ali Ahmed and social activist Fartuun Adan.

Her father was an ardent peace activist in the 1990s, who coined the famous mantra in Somalia "Drop the Gun, Pick up the Pen"; he was assassinated in 1996 for his human rights work and is known to this day as the Somali Father of Peace.

Ilwad returned from Canada to Somalia in 2010 whilst the conflict still raged heavily and the majority of Mogadishu and South Central Regions of Somalia were lost to the control of the Al-Qaeda linked terrorist group Al-Shabaab. She remained in Somalia ever since, alongside her mother Fartuun Adan co-founding the first rape crisis centre for survivors of sexual and gender based violence, designing interventions aimed at security sector reform to create an inclusive space for women in peace building, and developing programs for the disarmament and rehabilitation of child soldiers and adults defecting from armed groups for their socio-economic empowerment, rehabilitation and reintegration.

On November 20, 2019, local authorities confirmed her sister Almaas Elman, who had also returned to Somalia as an aid worker, had been shot and killed in a car, near the Mogadishu airport.

== Career ==
In honour of Ahmed, his wife Fartuun Adan and their children established the Elman Peace Centre in Mogadishu. Adan serves as the NGO's Executive Director, while their daughter Ilwad works alongside her. Ilwad serves therein as Director of Programs and Development. She is responsible for designing and overseeing the Elman Peace & Human Rights Centre's programs with a broad portfolio focus on

- Human Rights
- Gender Justice
- Protection of Civilians
- Peace & Security
- Social Entrepreneurship

She also helps run Sister Somalia, a subsidiary of the Elman Peace and Human Rights Center. The country's first program for assistance of victims of gender-based violence, it provides counseling, health and housing support for women in need. Elman's work has helped raise awareness locally on the issue, and encouraged changes in government policy. She has also carried out educational workshops for vulnerable members of society, and designed and implemented projects promoting alternative livelihood opportunities for both young and old.

In mid-2012, Mogadishu held its first ever Technology, Entertainment, Design (TEDx) conference. The event was organized by the First Somali Bank to showcase improvements in business, development and security to potential Somali and international investors. Ilwad was featured as a guest speaker, where she explained the role of Sister Somalia in the country's post-conflict reconstruction process.

Opposite 76 other activists from 36 different nations in Africa, Elman in 2011 represented Somalia during the "Climb Up, Speak OUT" campaign on Mount Kilimanjaro. The event was organized by UNite Africa under UNwomen, and concluded with the participants committing to end violence against women and girls.

In 2013, Elman was also featured in the documentary Through the Fire, along with Hawa Abdi and Edna Adan Ismail. She likewise appeared in the 2014 film Live From Mogadishu, which focuses on the Mogadishu Music/Peace Festival of March 2013. Organized by the ensemble Waayaha Cusub and the philanthropist Bill Brookman, it was the first international music festival to be held in Somalia's capital in years.

Beyond her duties at Elman Peace, Ilwad is an advocate for the Kofi Annan foundation's latest initiative called Extremely Together, where she and 9 other youth leaders under the mentorship of Mr. Kofi Annan are Preventing Violent Extremism by inspiring, engaging and empowering youth globally.

Ilwad additionally serves as the chair of the Child Protection Gender Based Violence Case Management Group in Mogadishu; is a founding member of the Advisory Committee for Researching Gender Based Violence Social Norms in Somalia and South Sudan, is a member of the international practitioners network for civilian casualty recording, an expert in the Women Waging Peace Network for Inclusive Security, and a strategic advisory group member on the global child protection area of responsibility.

She has served as the One Young World Ambassador to Somalia since 2013; completed President Barack Obama's flagship White House fellowship for Young African Leaders in 2014 and in the same year was appointed youth ambassador to Somalia for Ending Sexual Violence in Conflict.

In an exclusive report, in May, 2016, The Washington Post described the role of Elman, and the Elman Center, in rehabilitating boys, who had been freed from serving as child soldiers, for warlords, only to have been secretly recruited to serve as spies by Somalia's new intelligence agency.

Ilwad briefed the UN Security Council on the Protection of Civilians debate in 2015; it was the first time a civil society representative was invited to speak on this issue before the Security Council, as well as the first time the annual thematic debate focused on women's empowerment and participation. She later co-wrote the Youth Action Agenda on Countering Violent Extremism which was cited in the historic UN Security Council Resolution 2250 on youth, peace and security. August 2016, Ilwad was appointed by UN Secretary General Ban Ki-Moon an expert advisor on Youth, Peace & Security and has been tasked to counsel a study to develop a strategy on UNSCR 2250.

From the front lines of conflict and often in the face of insecurities; Ilwad continues with advocacy efforts of the EPHRC. Through the combined effect of the grass-root programmatic interventions she designs as well as her global advocacy; she caused national movements internally and garnered international attention externally to yield action towards solutions for the human suffering and protracted crisis in Somalia.

== Awards and recognition ==
Ilwad was honoured with the

- 2015 Gleitsman International Activist Award, Harvard Kennedy School Center for Public Leadership
- 2016 Right the Wrongs Award, Oxfam America
- 2016 Young African Woman of the Year Award
- 100 Most Influential Young Africans of 2017
- 2017 BET Global Good Star Award Recipient
- Finalist of the Aurora Prize for awakening humanity
- Elman was on the list of the BBC's 100 Women announced on 23 November 2020.

== Other honours ==
In 2014, Elman was appointed a YALI Fellow by the United States Department of State. In 2018, she was invited to attend the International Leaders Programme of the United Kingdom's Foreign and Commonwealth Office.

== See also ==
- Iman Elman – sister who serves in the Somali military
