= Fartuun Adan =

Somali social activist

- Fartuun Aadan فرتون آدن
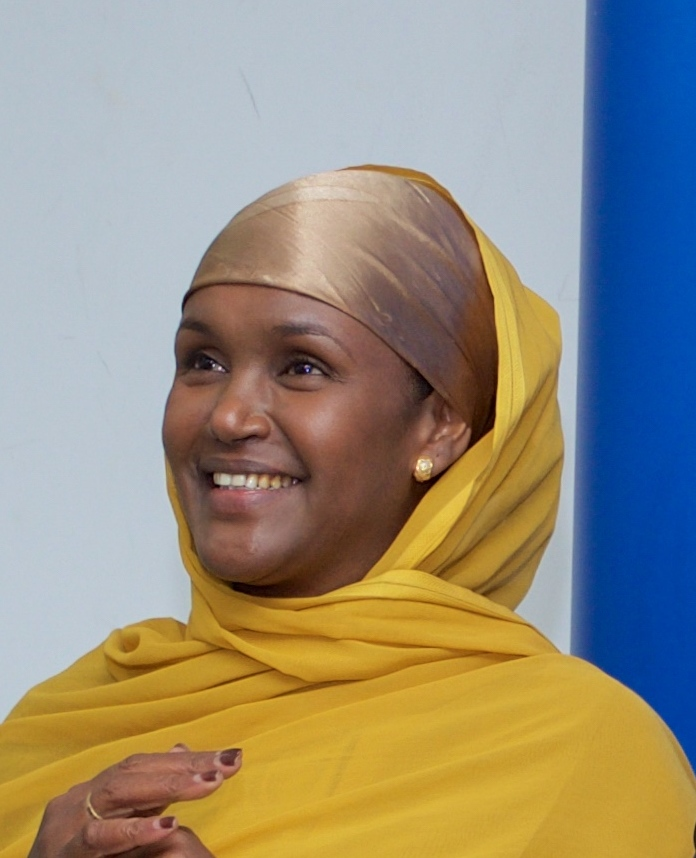
- Adan in 2015
- Born: February 2, 1969 (age 57); Somalia
- Occupation: Activist
- Title: Executive Director of the Elman Peace and Human Rights Centre
- Spouse: Elman Ali Ahmed
- Children: 4: Almas, Ilwad and Iman

Fartuun Abdisalaan Adan (Somali: Fartuun Aadan, Arabic: فرتون آدن) is a Somali social activist. She is the executive director of the Elman Peace and Human Rights Centre, a Mogadishu based organization that works on peace building and protecting and empowering marginalized groups. She is also the co-founder of Sister Somalia, which is Somali's first rape crisis and support program for survivors of gender-based violence.

Adan’s work has received multiple international honors, including the International Women of Courage Award from the United States Department of State in 2013, a human rights award from the German government in 2014, the Gleitsman International Activist Award from Harvard Kennedy School in 2015, the Aurora Prize for Awakening Humanity in 2020, and the Right Livelihood Award in 2022.

== Personal life ==
Fartuun Adan grew up in Somalia. She was married to Elman Ali Ahmed, a local entrepreneur and peace activist. Her husband was widely known in Mogadishu as the "Somali father of peace." He popularized the slogan “Drop the gun, pick up the pen” and created programs that help war-affected youth, including former child soldiers and orphans, move towards schooling and positive livelihoods. The couple had four daughters together.

In 1996, during the height of the Somali Civil War, Adan's husband was killed near the family's home in southern Mogadishu. Human rights organizations and later profiles in Somali diaspora media recount the 1996 assassination and its impact on the family marking it as turning point that pushed Adan into a more public role as a defender of peace and human rights. Soon after the assassination, Adan left Somalia with her daughters.

Fartuun Adan emigrated to Canada in 1999, settling in Ottawa. In interviews, she spoke about how she felt the work her and her husband had started in Mogadishu was unfinished. In 2007, she returned to Somalia to advocate for peace and human rights and to revive the organization that would become the current day Elman Peace and Human Rights Centre. Reports from Canadian news outlets described the traveling back and forth between Ottawa and Mogadishu, linking the Somali diaspora communities with local civil society in Somalia.

On November 20, 2019, local authorities confirmed her daughter Almaas Elman, who had also returned to Somalia as an aid worker, had been shot and killed in a car, near the Mogadishu airport. The tragic killing came more than two decades after the assassination of Elman Ali Ahmed, which prompted attention to the risks faced by Somali human rights activists. Adan and her surviving daughters chose to continue their work in Somalia, and as a result are looked at as a family that continues multigenerational activism despite repeated losses.

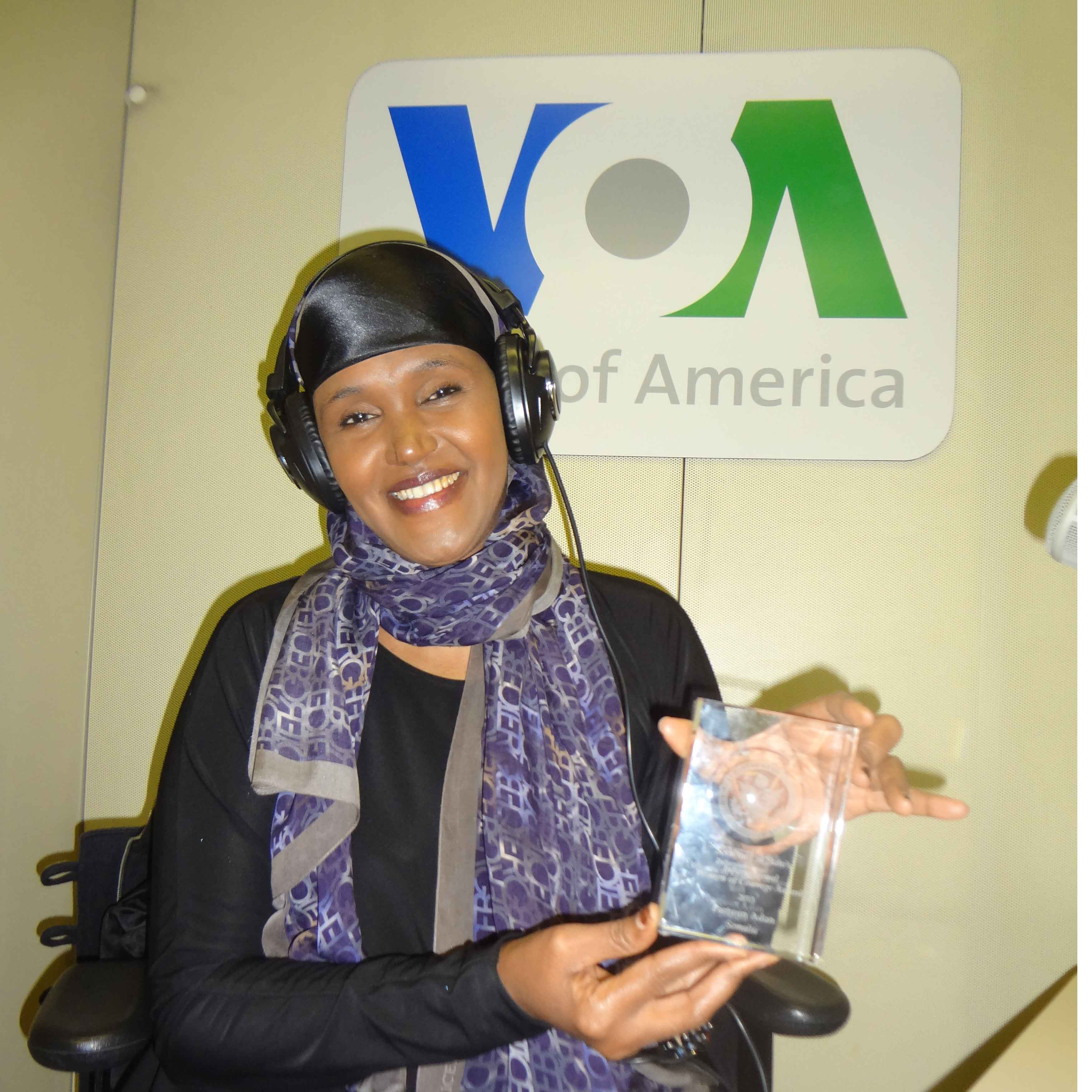
Somali activist Fartuun Adan

== Career ==
Fartuun Adan is the executive director of the Elman Peace and Human Rights Centre, a Mogadishu-based NGO established in honour of her late husband. She serves as the organization's Executive Director, while their daughter Ilwad works alongside her in a senior leadership role. According to the organization's own website, Elman Peace works across multiple pillars, including peace and reconciliation, human rights and protection, gender equality, climate and security, education, and job creation for young people.

The Right Livelihood Award foundation describes Elman Peace and Human Rights Centre as carrying forward the slogan “Drop the gun, pick up the pen” philosophy through community-based disarmament, rehabilitation, and reintegration of former combatants, including child soldiers. The organization combines counseling, basic education, vocational training and job placement, and has also created initiatives such as an ocean-therapy program that uses watergames and the sea as a part of trauma healing for children affected by war. Under Adan’s leadership, Elman Peace and Human Rights Centre has grown from a local center in Mogadishu to an entire network of people working in several regions of Somalia and even partners they advise in other African countries.

Through the center, she also co-founded Sister Somalia, the country's first program for assistance of victims of sexual violence. The project began informally when women and girls started coming to the Elman Peace office to ask for help after rape and other forms of sexual abuse, at a time when there was almost no services or legal remedies available. Sister Somalia grew into a network of safe houses and crisis centers offering medical care, psychosocial support, emergency shelter, legal accompaniment and livelihood training to survivors of rape and other forms of gender-based violence.

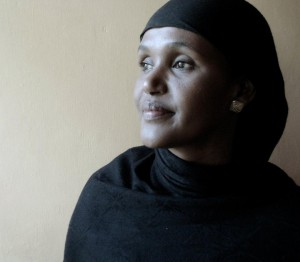
Fartuun Adan - Somalia - International Women of Courage Award 2013

In public conversations about the violence women in Somalia face, Adan described how survivors who speak out often face stigma, threats and even arrest, and has argued that addressing sexual violence is central to building peace rather than just another issue to dismiss. She and Ilwad Elman have participated in advocacy around sexual offences legislation in Somalia and in international campaigns for stronger protection of women and girls in conflict, including efforts associated with the Every Women Treaty initiative. Their work has been cited by groups such as the Nobel Women’s Initiative as helping to break a long-standing “wall of silence” around rape in Somalia.

Beyond Somalia, Elman Peace has engaged with regional peace and youth networks. The Right Livelihood Award notes that under Adan and Ilwad Elman’s leadership, the organization has nurtured a “Peace by Africa” network of grassroots groups in Lake Chad and Great Lakes regions, sharing experience on disarmament, youth reintegration, and gender justice. The Kofi Annan Foundation has profiled Ilwad as a member of its “Extremely Together" young leaders initiative and has emphasized the mother-daughter partnership at the heart of Elman Peace’s work.

== Awards ==
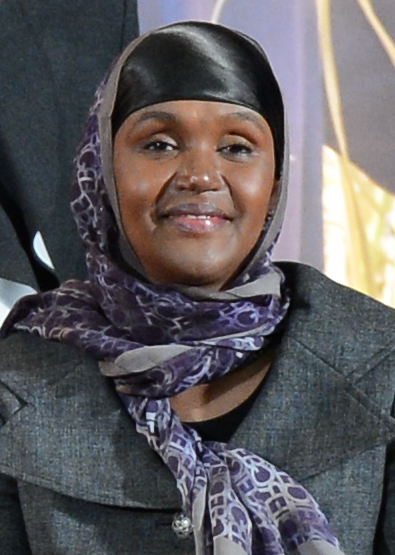
Fartuun Adan of Somalia – 2013 International Women of Courage Award Winner

In 2013, Fartuun Adan was presented an International Women of Courage Award from the United States Department of State "for her work as a champion of human rights and the elimination of sexual and gender-based violence in Somalia. Photographs from the ceremony show her receiving the award in Washington, D.C., alongside other women human rights defenders from all around the world.

In 2014, she also received an award from the government of Germany for her work with the Elman Peace and Human Rights Centre.

In November 2015, the Center for Public Leadership at Harvard Kennedy School announced that Fartuun Adan and Ilwad Elman would receive the Gleitsman International Activist Award for their leadership of the Elman Peace and Human Rights Centre and Sister Somalia. This award statement highlighted their work rehabilitating child soldiers, supporting survivors of sexual violence and influencing policy discussions on human in Somalia. Writer and activist Eve Ensler, who spoke at the award ceremony, described their centres as places where women "are transformed from survivors to leaders" and carry the work back to their communities.

Fartuun Adan, together with her daughter Ilwad Elman was among the finalists nominated for the Aurora Prize for Awakening Humanity in 2017. In 2020, the Aurora Humanitarian Initiative named them Aurora Prize Laureates, citing their work with survivors of war and sexual based violence and their commitment to grassroots peace building in Somalia. The prize was a $1 million USD award that would be channelled through Elman Peace into projects such as shelters for women and children, education and livelihoods programs, and long-term psychosocial support, with Aurora estimating that their initiatives had already helped tens of thousands of people.

In 2022, Fartuun Adan and Ilwad Elman received the Right Livelihood Award, often referred to as the "Alternative Nobel Prize," "for promoting peace, demilitarization and human rights in Somalia in the face of terrorism and gender-based violence". The award citation emphasized their “intergenerational and holistic” approach to peace building and described Elman Peace as a model for locally led initiatives in other conflict-affected regions.
