= Elman Ali Ahmed =

Somali entrepreneur and activist

Elman Ali Ahmed علم علي أحمد
- Born: Somalia
- Died: 9 March 1996; Mogadishu, Somalia
- Occupations: Entrepreneur, activist
- Spouse: Fartuun Adan
- Children: 4: Almass, Ilwad and Iman and Gesia

Elman Ali Ahmed (Somali: Cilmi Cali Axmed, Arabic: علم علي أحمد) was a Somali entrepreneur and social activist.

== Personal life ==
Ahmed was based in Mogadishu

Ahmed was married to Fartuun Adan, with whom he had four daughters.

Due to having receiving death threats, Ahmed had planned to move abroad. On 9 March 1996, he was assassinated near the family's home in the southern part of the city. The area was at the time under the control of faction leader Mohamed Farah Aidid. Although Ahmed's killing was alleged to have been politically related, a representative of Aidid denied involvement and instead condemned the murder.

In November, 2019, Elman's daughter, Almaas Elman, who had grown up in Canada, and who, with other family members, had returned to Somalia, as aid-workers, as adults, was killed near Mogadishu airport.

== Career ==
Professionally, Ahmed was a businessman with his own vehicle repair and recovery service. He also ran a technical training institute in the city to rehabilitate young militants during the height of the civil war.

Additionally, Ahmed was politically engaged, often taking to task local leaders for failing to put an end to the civil conflict. He was politically unaligned, and advocated peace and reconciliation.

Ahmed likewise managed Elman FC, a football team in the city, provided relief services to disadvantaged children, and contributed to rehabilitating community facilities such as roads and electricity.

== Elman Peace Centre ==
In honour of Ahmed, his wife Fartuun Adan and their children established the Elman Peace Centre in Mogadishu. Adan serves as the NGO's Executive Director, while their daughter Ilwad works alongside her.
