= List of Somalis =

This is a list of notable Somalis from Somalia, Somaliland, Djibouti, Kenya, Ethiopia as well as the Somali diaspora.

== Academics ==
- Ali A. Abdi – sociologist and educationist, and professor of education and international development at the University of British Columbia in Vancouver, British Columbia, Canada; former president of the Comparative and International Education Society of Canada (CIESC); founding/co-founding editor of the peer reviewed online publications, Journal of Contemporary Issues in Education and Cultural and Pedagogical Inquiry
- Mohamed Diriye Abdullahi – scholar, linguist and writer; published on Somali culture, history, language and ethnogenesis
- Aden Ibrahim Aw Hirsi – academic, politician, analyst. Has written extensively on Somali education reform, language dynamics and climate change
- Ali Jimale Ahmed – poet, essayist, scholar, and short story writer; published on Somali history and linguistics
- Shire Jama Ahmed (c. 1935–1989) – linguist who devised a unique Latin script for the Somali language
- Suleiman Ahmed Gulaid – prominent professor and the president of Amoud University
- Abdirahman Hussein – scholar and teacher at University of Tennessee
- Abdi Kusow – professor of sociology at Iowa State University in Ames, Iowa; has written extensively on Somali sociology and anthropology
- Mohamed Haji Mukhtar – professor of African and Middle Eastern History at Savannah State University; has written extensively on the history of Somalia and the Somali language
- Ismail Jim'ale Osoble – lawyer, once served as Minister of Information in the government of Aden Abdullah Osman Daar
- Abdi Ismail Samatar – prominent scholar and professor at the University of Minnesota
- Ahmed Ismail Samatar – prominent professor and Dean of the Institute for Global Citizenship at Macalester College; editor of Bildhaan: An International Journal of Somali Studies
- Said Sheikh Samatar (1943–2015) – prominent scholar and writer and former professor of history at Rutgers University; main areas of interest are history and linguistics

== Activists ==
- Elman Ali Ahmed (1935–1996)

– Founder of Elman Peace Centre 

- Dekha Ibrahim Abdi (1964–2011) – peace activist in Kenya
- Zam Zam Abdullahi Abdi – human rights activist and journalist
- Leila Abukar – political activist
- Fartuun Adan – social activist; founder and executive director of the Elman Peace Centre
- Elman Ali Ahmed – entrepreneur and social activist
- Halima Ahmed – political activist with the Youth Rehabilitation Center in Mogadishu
- Hodan Ahmed – political activist and Senior Program Officer at the National Democratic Institute
- Ifrah Ahmed – social activist; founder of the UYI NGO
- Nimco Ahmed – Somali-American political activist; State Director for the DFL
- Abdulkadir Yahya Ali (1957–2005) – peace activist, co-director and founder of the Center for Research and Dialogue.
- Abdirizak Bihi – social activist; Director of the Somali Education and Social Advocacy Center
- Ilwad Elman – social activist at the Elman Peace Centre
- Asha Haji Elmi (Caasha Xaaji Cilmi) (b. 1962) – peace activist in Somalia
- Leyla Hussein – psychotherapist and social activist; Chief Executive of Hawa's Haven; co-founder of Daughters of Eve
- Ahmed Hussen – Somali-Canadian lawyer and social activist; President of the Canadian Somali Congress
- Farhiyo Farah Ibrahim – Somali social activist
- Hanan Ibrahim – social activist based in the UK; founder of the Somali Family Support Group (SFSG)
- Fatima Jibrell (b. 1947) – Somali-American environmental activist; co-founder and executive director of the Horn of Africa Relief and Development Organization ("Horn Relief"); co-founder of Sun Fire Cooking; was instrumental in the creation of the Women's Coalition for Peace
- Hirsi Magan (Xirsi Magan Ciise) (1935–2008) – activist, scholar and one of the leading figures of the Somali Revolution
- Magid Magid – Somali-British activist and politician who served as the Lord Mayor of Sheffield
- Adam Matan – activist and community organiser who was the first Somali-Brit to be awarded the OBE medal by Prince William, Duke of Cambridge for services to the Somali community in the United Kingdom.
- Hawa Aden Mohamed – social activist; chairperson of the Galkayo Education Centre for Peace and Development
- Musse Olol – American social activist and Chairman of the Somali American Council of Oregon (SACOO)
- Hibaaq Osman – political strategist; chairperson of the ThinkTank for Arab Women, the Dignity Fund, and El-Karama
- Hawo Tako (d. 1948) – early 20th century female nationalist whose sacrifice became a symbol for pan-Somalism
- Mohamud Siad Togane (b. 1943) – Somali Canadian poet, professor, and political activist
- Shadya Yasin – Somali-Canadian social activist and member of the Ontario Premier's Council on Youth Opportunities

== Artists ==
- Aar Maanta – singer-songwriter, composer, and music producer
- Abdi Sinimo (c. 1920s–1967) – artist and inventor of the Balwo musical style
- Abdullahi Qarshe (1924–1994) – musician, poet and playwright known for his innovative styles of music which included a wide variety of musical instruments such as the guitar, piano, and oud
- Alisha Boe – actress, known for portraying Jessica in Netflix's original series 13 Reasons Why.
- Ali Feiruz (1931–1994) – musician; one of the first generation of Somali artists; prominent member of Hobolada Waaberi musical troupes
- Amin Amir – Somali-Canadian cartoonist and painter
- Barkhad Abdi – actor, best known for his portrayal of Abduwali Muse in the film, yCaptain Phillips, co-starring Tom Hanks
- Elisa Kadigia Bove – Somali-Italian actress and activist
- Guduuda 'Arwo – singer
- Hassan Sheikh Mumin (1930/31–2008) – poet, reciter, playwright, broadcaster, actor and composer
- Hasan Adan Samatar (b. 1953) – artist during the 1970s and 80s
- Dada Masiti, Ashraf poet, mystic and Islamic scholar.
- Mohamed Mooge Liibaan (1942–1984) – artist, teacher, instrumentalist, poetry and veteran
- Ahmed Mooge Liibaan (d. 1997) – artist from the Radio Hargeisa generation
- Magool (1948–2004) (Halima Khaliif Omar) – considered in Somalia as one of the greatest entertainers of all time
- Mohamed Sulayman Tubeec the King of Vocals
- Mocky (Dominic Salole) (b. 1974) – Somali-Canadian pop music performer
- Maryam Mursal (b. 1950) – musician, composer and vocalist whose work has been produced by the record label Real World
- Nimco Happy – singer
- Marian Joan Elliott Said (Poly Styrene) (1957–2011) – pioneering Somali-British punk rock singer with X-Ray Spex
- Jiim Sheikh Muumin – singer and instrumentalist
- Jonis Bashir – Somali-Italian actor and singer
- K'naan (b. 1978) – Somali-Canadian hip hop artist
- Khadija Qalanjo – singer and folklore dancer in the 1970s and 1980s
- Saba Anglana – Somali-Italian actress and international singer
- Waaberi – Somalia's foremost musical group; toured throughout several countries in Africa and Asia, including Egypt, Sudan and China
- Waayaha Cusub – music collective led by Falis Abdi
- Xiddigaha Geeska – Somali music band based in Hargeisa

== Athletes ==
- Liban Abdi (b. 1988) – international footballer; currently plays for Ferencvárosi TC in the Hungarian First Division, on loan from Sheffield United of England
- Mohammed Ahamed (b. 1985) – Somali-Norwegian – Canadian Olympian in 2012, Nike-sponsored athlete
- Abdi Mohamed Ahmed (b. 1962) – professional footballer
- Ahmed Said Ahmed (b. 1998) – professional footballer
- Omar Artan (b. 1992) – FIFA football referee
- Amin Askar (b. 1985) – Somali-Norwegian professional football player, playing for Fredrikstad FK in the Norwegian Premier League
- Faisal Jeylani Aweys – taekwondo practitioner
- Zahra Bani (b. 1979) – Somali-Italian javelin thrower
- Abdi Bile (b. 1962) – world champion middle distance runner in the 1500 metres, and three time Olympian
- Ayub Daud (b. 1990) – international footballer who plays as a forward/attacking midfielder for A.S. Gubbio 1910, on loan from Juventus
- Rizak Dirshe (b. 1972) – Swedish middle distance runner
- Mo Farah (b. 1983) – Somali-British gold medalist in international track and field; currently holds the British indoor record in the 3000 metre and won the 3000 m at the 2009 European Indoor Championships in Turin
- Youssouf Hersi (b. 1982)– professional footballer
- Abdisalam Ibrahim (b. 1991) – Somali-Norwegian footballer who plays for Manchester City; Premier League's first Somali player and also the first East African
- Fabio Liverani (b. 1976) – Somali-Italian international footballer
- Mustafa Mohamed (b. 1979) – Somali-Swedish long-distance runner who mainly competes in the 3000 meter steeplechase; won gold in the 2006 Nordic Cross Country Championships and at the first SPAR European Team Championships in Leiria, Portugal in 2009; beat the 31-year-old Swedish record in 2007
- Saadiq Abdikadir Mohamed (b. 1996) – Somali footballer having represented Kenya and Somalia internationally
- Mustafa Mahamuud (b. 1998) - fastest Somali in history

== Authors ==
- Jama Musse Jama (Jaamac Muuse Jaamac) (b. 1967) – ethnomathematician and writer
- Ayaan Hirsi Ali (Ayaan Xirsi Cali or Ayaan Hirsi Magan) (b. 1969) – feminist and political writer
- Gaariye (Mohamed Hashi Dhamac) (b. 1951) – poet and writer
- Yasmine Allas – actress and writer
- Farah Awl (1937–1991) – author; specialized in historical fiction
- Cristina Ali Farah (b. 1973) – Somali-Italian writer and poet
- Elmi Boodhari (d. 1940) – pioneer, writer and poet, known as (King of Romance) among Somalis
- Nuruddin Farah (b. 1945) – considered one of the greatest contemporary writers in the world
- Musa Haji Ismail Galal (b. 1917) – writer, scholar, historian and linguist; one of the foremost historical authorities on the Somali astrological, astronomical, meteorological and calendrical systems
- Hadrawi (Mohamed Ibrahim Warsame) (b. 1943) – songwriter, philosopher, and Somali Poet Laureate; dubbed the "Somali Shakespeare"
- Afdhere Jama (b. 1980) – Somali-American writer based in San Francisco
- Abdukadir Osman – writer
- Aadan Carab, poet who narrated the Dhulbahante genocide at the hands of European colonialists in the Darawiish era
- Salaan Carrabey (d. 1943) – legendary poet
- Hussein M. Adam – writer, journalist and professor
- Ladan Osman – poet and teacher
- Sofia Samatar – Somali-American writer
- Igiaba Scego – Somali-Italian writer
- Warsan Shire (b. 1988) – poet
- Abdillahi Suldaan Mohammed Timacade (1920–1973) – poet known for his nationalist poems such as "Kana siib Kana Saar"
- Abdourahman Waberi (b. 1965) – writer and teacher
- Nadifa Mohamed – Somali-British novelist and Fellow of the Royal Society of Literature

== Directors ==
- Fathia Absie – film director, broadcaster and writer
- Said Salah Ahmed – playwright, poet, educator and filmmaker
- Mo Ali – Somali-British film director
- Ali Said Hassan – film director and producer; former Somali Film Agency representative
- Idil Ibrahim – filmmaker; founder of Zeila Films
- Soraya Miré – writer, filmmaker and activist
- Barni Ahmed Qaasim – multimedia artist and filmmaker
- Abdulkadir Ahmed Said (b. 1953) – film director, producer, screenwriter, cinematographer and editor

== Entrepreneurs ==
- Nasra Agil – Somali-Canadian civil engineer and entrepreneur
- Omar A. Ali – entrepreneur, accountant, philanthropist, and specialist on Islamic finance; formerly CEO of DMI Trust, currently chairman of Integrated Property Investments Ltd and Quadron investments
- Abdirashid Duale – entrepreneur, philanthropist, and the CEO of the multinational enterprise Dahabshiil
- Liban Abdi Egal – founder and Chairman of First Somali Bank
- Faisal Hawar – engineer and entrepreneur; CEO, President, and co-founder of the International Somalia Development Foundation as well as the Maakhir Resource Company
- Amina Moghe Hersi (b. 1963) – entrepreneur; has launched several multimillion-dollar projects in Kampala, Uganda, such as the Oasis Centre luxury mall and the Laburnam Courts; runs Kingstone Enterprises Limited, one of the largest distributors of cement and other hardware materials in Kampala
- Ayaan and Idyl Mohallim – twin fashion designers and owners of the Mataano brand
- Aden Mohammed – banker and entrepreneur; managing director of Barclays Bank in East and West Africa; under his tenure BBK won the Banker Awards 2009
- Hodan Nalayeh – media executive and entrepreneur; President of the Cultural Integration Agency and the Vice President of Sales & Programming Development of Cameraworks Productions International
- Hussein Shire – businessman; founder and former CEO of Gateway Bus Company

== Journalists ==
- Mona Kosar Abdi – Somali-American multimedia journalist
- Hassan Abdillahi – journalist and social activist; founder and Chairman of Ogaal Radio
- Mohamoud Sheikh Dalmar – journalist and Islamic scholar
- Rageh Omaar (b. 1967) – Somali-British author and television news presenter; formerly a BBC news correspondent; in 2009, he moved to a new post at Al Jazeera English, where he currently presents the nightly weekday documentary series Witness
- Mohamed Abshir Waldo – political activist and journalist
- Ahmed Mohamed Kismayo – Somali journalist (died 2017)
- Abdirahman Yabarow – journalist; Editor-in-Chief of the VOA's Somali service

== Judges ==
- Abdulqawi Yusuf (b. 1948) – international lawyer, judge and former president of the International Court of Justice in the Hague.
- Adan Haji Ali – judge and current Chief Justice of Somaliland
- Khadra Hussein Mohammad – lawyer and first National Deputy Prosecutor in Somaliland
- Yusuf Haji Nur – former judge and President of the Supreme Court of the autonomous region of Puntland.

== Military ==
- Haji Yusuf Barre – commander of the biggest battle in Darawiish history, i.e. Jidbali; was the sole defender of Taleh Dhulbahante garesa
- Abdullahi Afrah (aasbaro)- leader in the Union of Islamic Courts (UIC)
- Sheikh Hassan Barsane – religious and nationalist leader who fought for freedom in the Somalia and fought many wars with Italy
- Yusuf Agararan – led most successful Darawiish raid since Dul Madoba
- Ibraahin Xoorane – Darawiish commander who killed Richard Corfield
- Axmed Aarey – Darawiish artillery commander who abetted Richard Corfield's death
- Afqarshe Ismail – former Darawiish spokesman-poet; first person to die in an airstrike in Africa
- General Mohamed Abshir Muse – First General, the commander of Somalia police 1960 1968
- General Nuh Ismail Tani – current chief of staff of Somaliland Armed Forces
- Abdikarim Yusuf Adam – army officer and Chief of TFG Army
- Muktar Hussein Afrah – officer in the army of the Transitional Federal Government
- Hassan Abdullah Hersi al-Turki (b. 1944) – Islamist leader in Somalia and military leader in the Islamic Courts Union
- Mohammed Hussein Ali (b. 1956) – major general in the Kenyan Army and former commissioner of the Kenya Police
- Botan Ise Alin (Bootaan Ciise Caalin) – former faction leader and former member of the Transitional Federal Government
- Osman Ali Atto (Cismaan Xasan Cali) (b. 1940) – faction leader affiliated with the Somali National Alliance
- Akil Dhahar – leader of the Sanaag region and some portions of the Bari region
- Matan ibn Uthman Al Somali (c. 1500–1531) – 16th century general of the Adal Sultanate
- Hasna Doreh – early 20th-century Somali female commander of Diiriye Guure
- Abdillahi Fadal Iman (1960–2019) – former commissioner of Somaliland Police Force
- Muhammad Ibrahim Habsade (Maxamed Ibraahim Xaabsade) – rebel soldier
- Hussein Hasan – famous warrior and poet
- Farah Nur – warrior and poet
- Guled Haji – wise sage and commander
- Mohammed Abdullah Hassan (1856–1920) – Dervish movement during the Scramble for Africa
- Ibrahim Boghol – commander of the Dervish movement
- Daud Abdulle Hirsi (1960–1965) – Somali general, considered the father of the Somali Military
- Ahmed Madobe – chairman and military commander of Raskamboni movement
- Salaad Gabeyre Kediye (d. 1972) – major general in the Somali military; a revolutionary
- Mohamed Adan Saqadhi (b. 1967) – current Commissioner of Somaliland Police Force
- Mahamoud Mohamed – former Chief of General Staff of the Kenya Defence Forces
- Mohamed Afrah Qanyare (Maxamed Qanyare Afrax) (b. 1941) – former faction leader
- Abdi Qeybdid (Cabdi Xasan Cawaale Qeybdiid) (b. 1948) – militia leader affiliated with the Somali National Alliance
- Muhammad Ali Samatar – former Minister of Defense; first vice president; Grand Commander of the Somali National Army (1969–1987)
- Yusuf Ahmed Sarinle (d. 2005) – general, commander of the Transitional National Government police force
- Osman Omar Wehliye – commander of the Somali Police Force from March 2011
- Ahmed Abdi Godane – former military leader of Al-Shabaab
- Kite Fiqi – warrior and poet
- General Yusuf Tallan – former Somali military commander

== Models ==
- Halima Aden (b. September 19, 1997) – American fashion model. She is noted for being the first Somali-American to compete and become a semi-finalist in the Miss Minnesota USA pageant.
- Jawahir Ahmed (b. 1991) – Somali-American model; as Miss Somalia, won 2013 Miss Africa Utah and was 2nd runner up in the 2013 Miss United Nations USA pageant
- Waris Dirie (b. 1965) – model, author, actress and human rights activist
- Ubah Hassan – Somali-Canadian model
- Iman (Iman Mohamed Abdulmajid) (b. 1955) – international fashion icon, supermodel, actress and entrepreneur
- Fatima Siad (b. 1986) – third-place finisher on America's Next Top Model, Cycle 10; professional model
- Mona Tougaard – Danish-born model
- Yasmin Warsame (b. 1976) – Somali-Canadian model; in 2004, she was named "The Most Alluring Canadian" in a poll by Fashion magazine

== Royals ==
- Diiriye Guure – head of the Dhulbahante during Dervish era
- Ibrahim Adeer – Somali Sultan; founder of the Sultanate of the Geledi
- Caaqil Dheryodhoobe – Sultan Of Duduble In The Late 1600s
- Osman Ahmed – last Sultan of the Geledi Sultanate
- Ahmad ibn Ali (fl. mid-14th century) – Somali Governor of the Ifat Sultanate
- Arrawelo – Somali Queen of 300 B.C.
- Gerad Ali Dable (d. 1503) – 12th Sultan of the Warsangali Sultanate
- Guled Abdi – first Grand sultan of the Isaaq
- Farah Guled – second Grand Sultan of the Isaaq
- Gerad Dhidhin (d. 1311) – founder of the Warsangali Sultanate
- Olol Diinle – last Sultan of the Neo-Ajuran Sultanate
- Deria Sugulleh Ainashe – second Sultan of the Habr Yunis
- Awad Deria – fifth Sultan of the Habr Yunis
- Mahamud Ibrahim – second Sultan of the Sultanate of the Geledi
- Yusuf Mahamud Ibrahim – third Sultan of the Geledi Sultanate and victor of the Bardera wars
- Yusuf Ali Kenadid – Somali ruler, and the founder of the Sultanate of Hobyo in the 1880s
- Osman Mahamuud – King of the Majeerteen Sultanate in the mid-19th to early 20th centuries
- Mahfuz – Emir of Harar and Governor of Zeila in the Adal Sultanate
- Abdillahi Deria – fifth Grand Sultan of the isaaq Garhejis [Eidagale]
- Abdulrahman Deria – Sultan of the Habr Awal
- Nur ibn Mujahid (d. 1567) – 16th-century Somali Emir and patron saint of Harar
- Faduma Sarjelle – Somali princess of the House of Garen
- Mohamoud Ali Shire (d. 1960) – 26th Sultan of the Warsangali Sultanate from 1897 to 1960
- Hersi Aman – legendary 3rd Sultan of the Habr Yonis
- Ahmed Yusuf (d. 1878) – fourth Sultan of the Gobroon Dynasty well versed in Islam and dominant in the Banadir
- Nur Ahmed Aman (d. 1908) – fourth Habr Yunis Sultan & major Dervish leader
- Deria Hassan – fourth Sultan of the Isaaq clan

== Pilots ==
- Asli Hassan Abade – first Somali female pilot; prominent member of the Somali Air Force; paved the way for gender equality within the military ranks
- Ali Matan Hashi – first Somali pilot and prominent member of SRC
- Mustafa Mohamed Moalim (Mustafa Maxamed Macalin) (1943–2009) – first Somali fighter pilot; chief of the Somali Air Force School; chief of the Somali Air Force Operations
- Muse Bihi Abdi – Somali air pilot
- Khalif Isse Mudan – Balidoogle military base pilot

== Politicians ==
=== Presidents of Somalia ===
- Abdiqasim Salad (Cabdiqaasim Salaad Xasan) (b. 1941) – former President of Somalia
- Ali Mahdi Muhammad (1938–2021) – fourth President of Somalia
- Abdirashid Shermarke (1919–1969) – second President of Somalia
- Aden Daar (1908–2007) – Somali politician and the country's first president
- Siad Barre (1919–1995) – third President of Somalia
- Abdullahi Yusuf Ahmed (1934–2012) – former President of Somalia, first President of Puntland, founder of the Somali Salvation Democratic Front, the Puntland State of Somalia, and the Transitional Federal Government
- Muse Hassan Sheikh Sayid Abdulle (b. 1940) – former acting President of Somalia and former speaker of the Federal Parliament of Somalia; former General in the Somali National Army
- Sharif Sheikh Ahmed (b. 1964) – former President of Somalia and former chairman of the Alliance for the Re-liberation of Somalia Alliance for the Re-liberation of Somalia. He was also Commander in Chief of the Islamic Courts Union.

=== Presidents of Puntland ===
- Abdullahi Yusuf Ahmed (1934–2012) – former President of Somalia, first President of Puntland, founder of the Somali Salvation Democratic Front, the Puntland State of Somalia, and the Transitional Federal Government
- Yusuf Haji Nur (Yuusuf Xaaji Nuur) – former acting President of Puntland
- Jama Ali Jama – former President of Puntland
- Mohamed Abdi Hashi (d. July 12, 2020) – First Vice President of Puntland (1998–2004) and Second President of Puntland ~interim (2004–2005)
- Mohamud Muse Hersi Cadde (d. August 1, 2020) – Third President of Puntland (2005–2009)
- Abdirahman Farole (b. 1945) – Fourth President of Puntland (2009–2014)
- Abdiweli Mohamed Ali Gaas (b. 1963) – Fifth President of Puntland (2014–2019)
- Said Abdullahi Deni (b. 1965) – Sixth and current President of Puntland ($\thicksim$2019)
- Hassan Dahir Afqurac (d. 2013) – Third Vice President of Puntland (2005–2009)
- Abdisamad Ali Shire (d. 2021) – Fourth Vice President of Puntland (2009–2014)
- Abdihakim Abdullahi Haji Omar Amey – Fifth Vice President of Puntland (2014–2019)
- Ahmed Elmi Osman Karaash – Sixth and current Vice President of Puntland ($\thicksim$2019)

=== Presidents of Somaliland ===
- Abdirahman Ahmed Ali Tuur (1931–2003) – first President of Somaliland 1991–1993
- Abdirahman Aw Ali Farrah – third Vice President of Somaliland 1995–1997
- Dahir Riyale Kahin (b. 1952) – third President of Somaliland 2002–2010
- Ahmed Mohamed Mohamoud (b. 1936) – fourth President of Somaliland 2010–2017
- Muse Bihi Abdi (b. 1948) – fifth President of Somaliland 2017–2024
- Abdirahman Mohamed Irro sixth and current President of Somaliland 2024.

=== Presidents of Djibouti ===
- Hassan Gouled Aptidon (1916–2006) – first President of Djibouti, 1977–1999
- Ismaïl Omar Guelleh (b. 1947) – second and current President of Djibouti

=== Acting presidents ===
- Mohamed Jawari – acting President of Somalia and incumbent speaker of the Federal Parliament of Somalia
- Aden Madobe – former acting President of Somalia
- Michael Mariano (d. 1987) – Somali Youth League member, Ambassador, and notable advocate for occupied Somalis in Ethiopia

=== Prime ministers ===
- Cabbaas Xuseen – first prime minister of the Darawiish (1895–1900)
- Abdirashid Shermarke – first prime minister of Somalia after independence ~1960
- Xaashi Suni Fooyaan – peace-time prime minister of the Darawiish (1905–1906)
- Abdiweli Sheikh Ahmed – former prime minister of Somalia
- Abdiweli Gaas – former prime minister of Somalia
- Osman Jama Ali (Cismaan Jaamac Cali) (b. 1941) – prime minister under the Transitional National Government
- Muse Bihi Abdi (b. 1948) – former military officer; chairman of the Peace, Unity, and Development Party and current president of Somaliland
- Muhammad Haji Ibrahim Egal (Maxamed Xaaji Ibraahim Cigaal) (1993–2002) – President of Somaliland and former prime minister of Somalia
- Hassan Abshir Farah (Xasan Abshir Faarax) (b. 1945) – former prime minister of Somalia, former mayor of Mogadishu, and MP
- Ali Khalif Galaydh (Cali Khalif Galaydh) (1941–2020) – former prime minister of Somalia under the Transitional National Government
- Umar Arteh Ghalib (Cumar Carte Qaalib) (1922–2020) – former prime minister of Somalia
- Ali Ghedi (Cali Maxamed Geedi) (b. 1951) – former prime minister of the Transitional Federal Government (TFG)
- Abdiwahid Gonjeh – former acting prime minister of Somalia
- Abdi Farah Shirdon – former prime minister of Somalia
- Abdirizak Haji Hussein (Cabdirasaaq Xaaji Xuseen) (1924–2014) – Prime Minister of Somalia early in the 1960s
- Nur Hassan Hussein (Nuur Xasan Xuseen "Nuur Cade") (1938–2020) – former prime minister of the TFG
- Abdullahi Issa (Cabdullahi Ciise Maxamuud) (1922–1988) – first prime minister of Somalia
- Muhammad Abdi Yusuf – former prime minister of Somalia
- Hassan Ali Khaire (b. 1968) – former prime minister of Somalia
- Mohamed Abdullahi Mohamed ("Farmajo") (b. 1962) – former prime minister of Somalia and current president
- Omar Sharmarke (b. 1960) – former prime minister of Somalia
- Mohamed Hussein Roble – former prime minister of Somalia
- Hamza Abdi Barre – current prime minister of Somalia

=== Other politicians ===
- Asha Ahmed Abdalla – Somali parliamentarian and activist
- Hamse Mohamed Abdi – Somaliland politician; Governor of Togdheer 2018-present
- Yusuf Hassan Abdi (b. 1958) – senior Somali diplomat; Member of Kenya Parliament
- Zahra Abdulla (b. 1966) – Somali politician in Finland; a member of the Helsinki City Council, representing the Green League
- Abdirahman Mohamed Abdullahi – former speaker of House of Representatives of Somaliland and founder of Waddani Party
- Fawzia Yusuf Adam – former foreign minister of Somalia
- Abdirahman abdishakur warsame – former Minister of Planning and International relations
- Abdullahi Ahmed Addow (Cabdilaahi Axmed Caddoow) (b. 1936) – senior Somali politician and diplomat
- Ali Mohamed Ahmed – Head of Somali Business union and former Somali Customs Manager; former adviser of Somali president Sharif Sheikh Ahmed
- Mohamed Kahin Ahmed – current Minister of Interior of Somaliland
- Abdurrahman Mahmoud Aidiid – current Mayor of Hargesia
- Mohamed Farrah Aidid (Maxamed Faarax Caydiid) (1934–1996) – chairman of the United Somali Congress and later the Somali National Alliance
- Fatuma Ibrahim Ali – Somali legislator; MP in National Assembly of Kenya
- Abdihakim Amey – Vice President of Puntland
- Abukar Arman – Somali writer and diplomat; former Special Envoy of Somalia to the United States
- Aden Ibrahim Aw Hirsi (b. 1968) – Somali politician, Sufi, author, educator and poet; the governor of Gedo region, 2006–2009
- Hassan Dahir Aweys (Xasan Daahir Aweys) (b. 1935) – head of the 90-member Shura council of the Islamic Courts Union
- Abdirahman Jama Barre – former foreign minister of Somalia and close relative of Siad Barre; longest-serving Somali diplomat
- Haji Bashir – first president of the Somali National Assembly; former Minister of Health and Labour of Somalia
- Fatimo Isaak Bihi – ambassador to Geneva and former director of the African Department of the Ministry of Foreign Affairs
- Ali Dhere – cleric; head of the first Islamic Courts Union in Mogadishu in 1996; spokesman for Al-Shabaab
- Hussein Ali Duale (Xuseen Cali Ducaale) – former Finance Minister of Somaliland, and former ambassador of Somalia to Kenya and Uganda
- Hussein Abdi Dualeh – former Minister of Energy & Minerals of Somaliland
- Khadra Ahmed Dualeh – former Minister of Commerce and Industry
- Adan Ahmed Elmi – former Minister of Agriculture of Somaliland
- Bashe Mohamed Farah – speaker of the House of Representatives of Somaliland
- Adde Gabow (Mohamed Ali Hassan or Maxamed Cali Xasan) – former governor of the Banaadir region and mayor of Mogadishu
- Suleiman Haglotosiye – former Minister of Health of Somaliland
- Anisa Hajimumin – Somali-American politician, social activist and writer; Minister of Women & Family Affairs of Puntland
- Bur'i Mohamed Hamza – State Minister of Foreign Affairs of Somalia
- Abdulkadir Abdi Hashi – politician; MP and former Minister of State for Planning and International Cooperation of Puntland
- Abdishakur Mohamoud Hassan – current Mayor of Berbera
- Ahmed M. Hassan – Somali American member-elect of the Clarkston City Council
- Hassan Abdallah Hassan – current mayor of Bosaso
- Mohamed Moallim Hassan – politician who served as minister of fishery and marine resources of Somalia, 2010–2011
- Sadak Omar Hassan – politician and Brigadier General
- Mark Hendrick (b. 1958) – Somali-British politician and Labour Co-operative Member of Parliament
- Abdirashid Mohamed Hidig (Cabdirashiid Maxamed Xidig) – Member of Parliament in the Transitional Federal Parliament
- Sheikh Mukhtar Mohamed Hussein (Sheekh Mukhtaar Maxamed Xuseen) (b. 1912) – speaker of parliament and interim president
- Zakia Hussein – politician; Secretary General of the Hanoolaato Party
- Halima Ismail Ibrahim – Chair of Somalia's National Independent Electoral Commission
- Mohamed Mohamud Ibrahim (b. 1946/47) – Deputy Prime Minister and Minister of Foreign Affairs of Somalia
- Jaylaani Nur Ikar – first deputy speaker of the Federal Parliament of Somalia
- Yusuf Mohammed Siad Inda'ade (Yuusuf Maxamed Siyaad "Indhacadde") – member of the Islamic Courts Union
- Abdullahi Sheikh Ismail (Cabdullaahi Sheekh Ismaaciil) – deputy prime minister and foreign minister in the TFG
- Edna Adan Ismail (Edna Aadan Ismaaciil) (b. 1937) – former Foreign Minister of Somaliland
- Ismail Ali Ismail – writer and former diplomat
- Bashir Isse – Governor of the Central Bank of Somalia
- Ali Ibrahim Jama – current governor of the Central Bank of Somaliland
- Ahmed Sheikh Jama – academician, writer, poet and politician; former Minister of Information of Puntland
- Farah Ali Jama – politician; former minister of finance of Puntland
- Abdirizak Jurile – Vice Minister of Foreign Affairs (1989–1991); Minister of Planning and International cooperation (2005–2008); Minister of telecommunications (2009–2011); Member of the Upper House of the Federal Government of Somalia; Senator (2016)
- Maryam Kassim – Minister of Social Development of Somalia
- Mohamed Kiimiko – politician and diplomat
- Farah Maalim – current deputy speaker of the Kenyan parliament
- Mahboub Maalim – diplomat; Executive Secretary of the Intergovernmental Authority on Development
- Hassan Ali Mire – politician; first Minister of Education of the Somali Democratic Republic
- Abdinur Sheikh Mohamed – Somali-American educator and politician; former Minister of Education, Higher Education and Culture of Somalia
- Ali Omar Mohamed – former manager of Berbera Port
- Amina Mohamed – former chairman of the International Organization for Migration and the World Trade Organisation's General Council, and current Secretary for Foreign Affairs of Kenya
- Hussein Maalim Mohamed – former Kenyan Minister of State in the office of the president
- Hassan Haji Mohamoud – former Minister of Education of Somaliland
- Yasin Haji Mohamoud – current Foreign Minister of Somaliland
- Mohamed Hassan Maidane – current mayor of Borama
- Mohammed Said Hersi Morgan (Maxamed Siciid Xirsi Moorgan) – son-in-law of Siad Barre and Minister of Defense of Somalia
- Gobsan Muhumed – member of the Federal Parliament of Somalia and the Pan-African Parliament
- Ismail Qasim Naji (Ismaaciil Qaasim Naaji) – chief of staff of the Transitional Federal Government
- Ahmed Abdi Ogle (1937–2006) – first Somali to serve in the Kenyan Parliament in the 60s; three times elected and served as Assistant Minister and later Deputy Mayor of Nairobi
- Daud Mohamed Omar – Minister of Mineral Resources of Somalia
- Mohamed Abdullahi Omaar – former Foreign Minister of Somalia
- Mohammad Abdullahi Omar – politician; former Foreign Minister of Somaliland
- Daud Mohamed Omar – Minister of Mineral Resources of Somalia
- Ilhan Omar – U.S. Representative from Minnesota's 5th congressional district
- Mohamed Amin Osman – member of the Transitional Federal Parliament
- Sheikhnor Abikar Qassim – founder of one of the Southern Somali Union
- Saynab Qayad – member of the Transitional federal parliament of Somalia
- Ali Said Raygal – former Minister of Youth and Sports of Somaliland
- Yusuf Warsame Saeed – former Mayor of Hargeisa
- Aadil Sheegow Sagaar — current State Minister for Parliamentary Relations of Somalia
- Abdirahman Saylici – current vice president of Somaliland
- Mohamed Aden Sheikh (c. 1925–2010) – intellectual, former head of Somali Technological Development, former Minister of Education, and former Minister of Health
- Dr. Saad Ali Shire – current Finance Minister of Somaliland
- Abbas Abdullahi Sheikh Siraji (1985–2017) – Minister of Public Works and Reconstruction
- Mohamud Siraji – Member of Somali Parliament
- Faysal Ali Warabe – engineer and politician; founder and Chairman of (UCID political party
- Abdi Warsame – Somali American former member of the Minneapolis City Council
- Saado Ali Warsame – singer-songwriter and politician; former MP in the Federal Parliament of Somalia
- Ahmed Abdallah Wayel – former Minister of Education (2012)
- Adan Keynan Wehliye – Kenyan politician and long time member of parliament from Wajir
- Ahmed Yusuf Yasin (b. 1957) – former vice president of Somaliland
- Mohamed Bihi Yonis (b. 1947) – Deputy Joint United Nations African Union Special Representative for Darfur and former Foreign Minister of Somaliland
- Maryan Abdullahi Yusuf – banker; deputy governor of the Central Bank of Somalia
- Yaasiin Maaxi Macalin– politician, founder of the Somali Social Unity Party

== Scientists ==
- Abdusalam Abubakar (b. 1989/90) – one of the youngest winners of the BT Young Scientist of the Year Award; later went on to win the European Union Contest for Young Scientists for his project, An Extension of Wiener's Attack on RSA
- Hassan al-Jabarti (d. 1774) – mathematician, theologian, astronomer and philosopher, considered one of the great scholars of the 18th century
- Ali Said Faqi – scientist and the leading researcher on the design and interpretation of toxicology studies at the MPI research center in Mattawan, Michigan
- Jama Musse Jama (b. 1967) – ethnomathematician and author; known for his research on traditional Somali board games such as Shax and the history of mathematics in the Horn of Africa and the founder of Hargeisa Cultural Center
- Ahmed Mumin Warfa – scientist, specialised in botany and jointly discovered the Cyclamen somalense, the first genus from tropical Africa with his colleague Mats Thulin; the "world's pre-eminent authority on frankincense"; professor at Salt Lake Community College

== Muslim theologians ==
- Ishaaq bin Ahmed – 12th century cleric and forefather of the large Isaaq clan-family
- Sheikh Ali Warsame (1939–2022), prominent Somali Islamic cleric and preacher
- Abd al Aziz al-Amawi (1832–1896) – 19th-century diplomat, historian, poet, jurist and scholar living in the Sultanate of Zanzibar
- Sheikh Abdulkadir Nur Farah – Somali Cleric assassinated by Al-Shabab 2013
- Uways al-Barawi (1847–1909) – scholar credited with reviving Islam in 19th-century East Africa and with followers in Yemen and Indonesia
- Sheikh Madar (1825–1918) – Qadiriyya leader who was influential in the expansion of Hargeisa
- Abd al-Rahman al-Jabarti (1753–1825) – scholar living in Cairo; recorded the Napoleonic invasion of Egypt
- Abdirahman bin Isma'il al-Jabarti (fl. 10th–11th centuries) – early Muslim leader and forefather of the Darod clan
- Ali al-Jabarti (d. 1492) – 15th-century scholar and politician in the Mamluk Empire
- Yusuf bin Ahmad al-Kawneyn – 13th-century scholar and saint; associated with the development of Wadaad's writing
- Abdallah al-Qutbi (1879–1952) – polemicist theologian and philosopher; best known for his Al-Majmu'at al-mubaraka ("The Blessed Collection"), a five-part compilation of polemics
- Abd Al-Rahman bin Ahmad al-Zayla'i (1820–1882) – scholar; played a crucial role in the spread of the Qadiriyya movement in Somalia and East Africa
- Abadir Umar Ar-Rida – 13th-century cleric and saint of Harar; forefather of the Sheekhaal Somali clan
- Sa'id of Mogadishu – 14th-century scholar and traveler; his reputation as a scholar earned him audiences with the Emirs of Mecca and Medina; travelled across the Muslim world and visited Bengal and China
- Shaykh Sufi – born Abdul-Rahman bin Abdallah al Shashi (Arabic: عبد الرحمن بن عبد الله شاشي) (1829–1904), 19th-century scholar, poet, reformist and astrologist
- Uthman bin Ali Zayla'i (d. 1342) – 14th-century theologian and jurist who wrote the single most authoritative text on the Hanafi school of Islam, four volumes known as the Tabayin al-Haqa'iq li Sharh Kanz al-Daqa'iq
- Hussain Bisad – tallest Somali man alive; has the largest hand span in the world
- Haji Ali Majeerteen – popularly known as al-Majeerteen; was a Somali Sheikh and poet

== See also ==
- Somali people
- Music of Somalia
- Music of Djibouti
- Somali culture
