= List of Somali actors =

This is a list of notable actors and actresses from Somalia. This list includes people from Somalia, Somaliland, Djibouti, Kenya, Ethiopia as well as the Somali diaspora.

== A ==
- Barkhad Abdi
- Prince Abdi
- Yasmine Allas
- Saba Anglana

== B ==
- Jonis Bashir
- Alisha Boe
- Elisa Kadigia Bove

== D ==
- Waris Dirie (b. 1965)

== I ==
- Iman (Iman Mohamed Abdulmajid) (b. 1955)

== M ==
- Hassan Sheikh Mumin (1930/31–2008)
- Jiim Sheikh Muumin

== W ==
- Yasmin Warsame
- Yusra Warsama

== See also ==
- List of Somali people
- Cinema of Somalia
