= Aadel =

Aadel may refer to:

== People ==
- Aadel Bülow-Hansen (1906–2001), Norwegian physiotherapist
- Aadel Kardooni (born 1968), British-Iranian rugby union player
- Aadel Lampe (1857–1944), Norwegian women's rights leader
- Reda Aadel (born 1990), Moroccan cyclist

== Places ==
- Ait Aadel, small town and rural commune in Al Haouz Province of the Marrakech-Tensift-Al Haouz region of Morocco

== Other ==
- Aadil, male given name
