= Muhumed =

- Gender: Male
- Language: Somali language

Other names
- Alternative spelling: Muhumet
- Related names: Mamadou

Muhumed is a given name and a surname of Somali origin. Notable people with the name include:

== Given name ==
- Muhumed Hassan Jama, Somaliland politician

== Surname ==
- Ahmed Muhumed (born 1998), American long-distance runner of Somali origin
- Gobsan Muhumed, Somali politician
