= Mohamed Osman =

Mohamed Osman may refer to:

- Mohamed Osman (weightlifter) (born 1974), Egyptian weightlifter
- Mohamed Osman, a figure in the 2010 U.S. anti-terrorism investigation Operation Arabian Knight
- Mohamed Osman Irro (died 1978) Somali Army Officer
- Mohamed Osman Mohamud (born 1991), perpetrator of the 2010 Portland car bomb plot
- Mohamed Osman Tahir (born 1984), Sudanese soccer (football) player
- Mohamed Ahmed Osman (born 1920), Egyptian Olympic wrestler
- Mohamed Amin Osman, Somali politician
- Mohamed Hamdi Osman (born 1954), Egyptian Olympic basketball player
- Mohamed Hassan bin Osman (born 1948), Malaysian Olympic sprinter
- Mohamed Sheikh Osman (died 2005), Somali politician
- Mohammed Osman, Syrian footballer
- Mohamed Osman (born 1988), Tunsian project manager, cybersecurity specialist
