= Somali Social Unity Party =

Political party in Somalia

Somali Social Unity Party Xisbiga Midnimada Bulshada Somaliyed
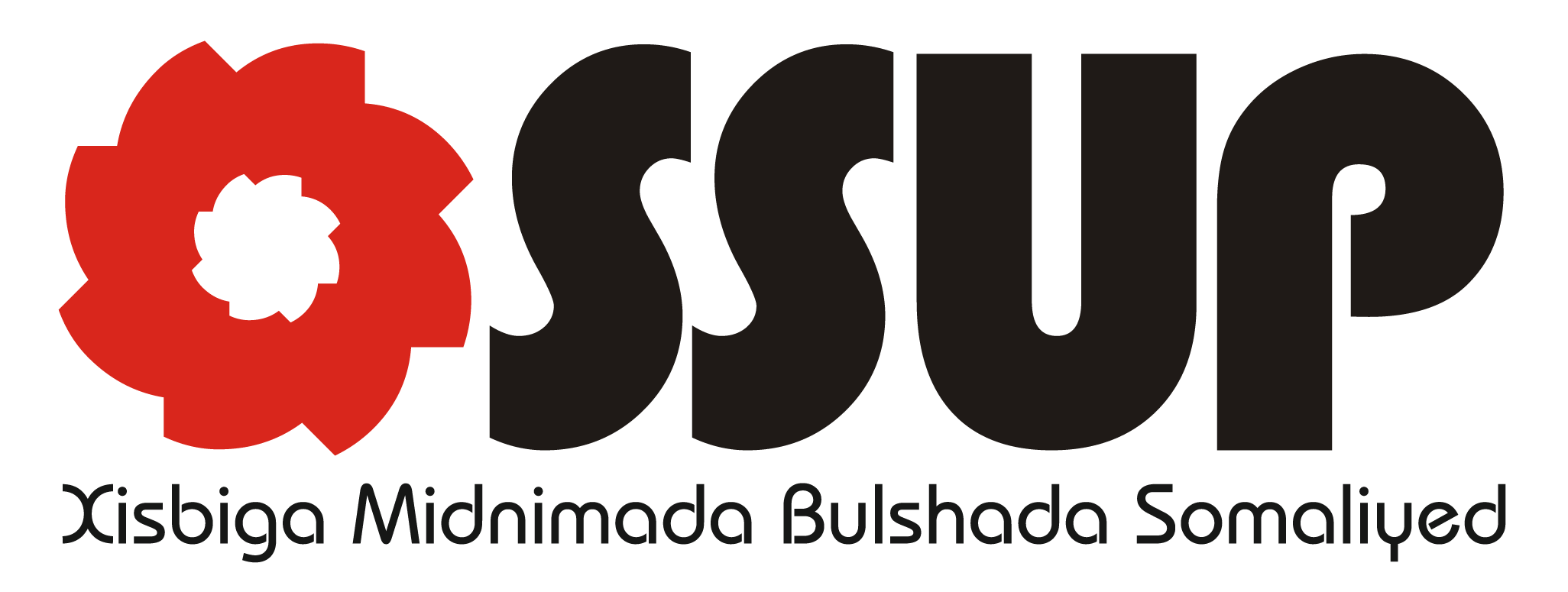
- Chairperson: Yassin Mahi Mallin
- Founded: 2004
- Headquarters: Mogadishu
- Ideology: Social democracy Civic nationalism
- Political position: Center-left

Website
- ssup.so

The Somali Social Unity Party (SSUP; Somali: Xisbiga Midnimada Bulshada Somaliyed) is a political party in Somalia founded in 2004, by a group of Somali intellectuals, youth, and exiled politicians. The party advocates for national unity, democratic governance, and social development, both within Somalia and among the Somali diasporas.

== History ==
SSUP was established during the prolonged Somali civil conflict, with its founders aiming to contribute to the rebuilding of the country’s political institutions. The party was formed as an alternative political platform centered on peace, inclusive governance, and national cohesion.

Since its inception, SSUP has regularly organized congresses and consultations, engaging its members and broader society in discussions on political and development issues. These gatherings have included party officials, parliamentarians, regional leaders, academics, women, elders, and youth representatives.

The party has remained active through public statements, social programs, and political events aimed at strengthening democratic institutions in Somalia. In 2005, SSUP criticized the Nairobi-based transitional government and parliament for failing to meet the expectations of the Somali people.

== Ideology ==
SSUP is grounded in social democracy and civic nationalism. It opposes tribalism and aims to promote national unity, good governance, and democratic participation.

== Activities ==
=== National engagement ===
In March 2015, SSUP held its 10th General Assembly in Mogadishu, with participation from parliamentarians, civil society, and community leaders.

In December 2016, SSUP hosted a political conference in Nairobi focused on the role of parties in multiparty democracy. Attendees included Somali presidential candidates, new parliamentarians, and representatives from the Social Democratic parties of Sweden and Kenya.

On 18 October 2017, SSUP chairman Yassin Mahi Mallin visited victims of the Zoobe intersection bombing in Mogadishu, donating blood and calling for national unity in response to the tragedy. He also thanked the governments of Turkey and Djibouti for their humanitarian assistance.

In 2018, SSUP condemned comments made by Somaliland politician Faysal Ali Warabe regarding then Somalia’s Minister of Ports and Transport, Maryam Aweys Jama. The party issued a statement calling for an apology and urged the international community to reassess support for Warabe and his party.

=== International outreach ===
From its inception, SSUP has maintained strong international ties, particularly in Europe. In 2004, party representative Saida Sheikh Ahmed met with Brussels Minister Charles Picqué to present SSUP’s political vision and explore support for Somalia’s stabilization. Saida also served as a member of the Belgian Socialist Party (PS).

In 2005, chairman Yasin Mahi held a high-level meeting with then Swedish Minister for International Development Cooperation Carin Jämtin, facilitated by Sweden’s Ministry of Foreign Affairs. He expressed appreciation for Sweden’s humanitarian efforts and outlined SSUP’s commitment to democratic values and youth empowerment.

In 2012, chairman Yasin Mahi welcomed the visit of then UN Deputy Secretary-General Jan Eliasson to Mogadishu as a milestone in Somalia's reconstruction.
