= Hussein Hasan =

Somali poet and warrior of the Eidagale Isaaq clan

Husein Hasan Xusein Xasan
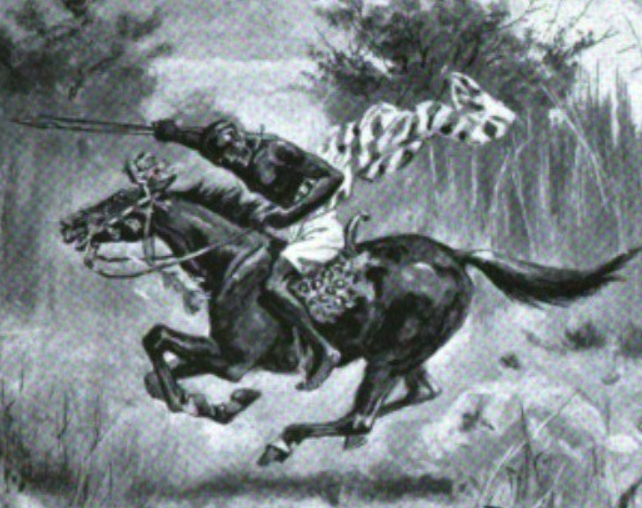
- Husein Hasan riding Mangalool
- Born: 1850s
- Died: 1910s
- Occupations: Poet, Warrior

Husein Hasan (Somali: Xusein Xasan; 1850s–1910s) was a famous Somali poet and warrior of the Eidagale Isaaq clan known for his skills in battle and hot temper.

== Biography ==
Husein belonged to the Rer Guled branch of the Eidagale and was a great-grandson of the 1st Isaaq Sultan Guled Abdi.

=== War within the Eidagale ===
Tensions were high between the Rer Guled and another subclan of Eidagale. Hussein urged his Rer Guled to continue their conflict. Standing against Hussein was a similarly skilled poet & warrior Hersi Absiyeh (Somali: Xirsi Cabsiye), a prominent member of the closely related Rer Abdi Bari who were warring with the Rer Guled. In response to this fighting Sultan Deria Hassan himself a member of the Rer Guled called for the regular shir or meeting of subclans where he would take council and advise on what decisions to make next for the Eidagale. Sultan Deria ruled that blood payment or mag was sufficient for both parties to exchange at the shir with the Rer Guled losing six and the Abdi Bari six as well. Hussein stood and recited a rousing gabay rejecting the decision.

Lix nin oo mankiyo shaalka iyo midhaha Guuleed ah
Oo wada ma dhaafta ah raggii ugu maloongeeyey
Inaan waliba maal ugu daraa waa masalo dhaafe
Waligeed markaha looma culin magannu soocnaaye
Waa waxaanay dhagahaygu maqal maanta ka horoowe
Inaanaan cayuun soo madhayn mudhayo dhaadheer leh
Haddaynu Reer Mataan nahay sidaa waydun maan garane

— Xuseen Xasan
Translation:

Six men who are the buds, the shawl and the fruit (youth) of Guuleed
Who together were the best, most excellent of men
That I add wealth to that is beyond the pale
We’ll never purify the vessel with blood compensation which we have separated off
This is something my ears have never heard before today
That we empty [our hands] of very tall camels
If we are Reer Mataan you will follow my thinking

Sultan Deria responded by sending Hussein away to Berbera and then resuming the shir. Absiyeh was made to swear a solemn oath not to recite a gabay following the Sultan's decision but he could not resist, especially since Hussein was away. Hussein returned and lamented that he missed the occasion and the two other men (Deria & Absiyeh) prevailed that day.

=== Mangalool ===
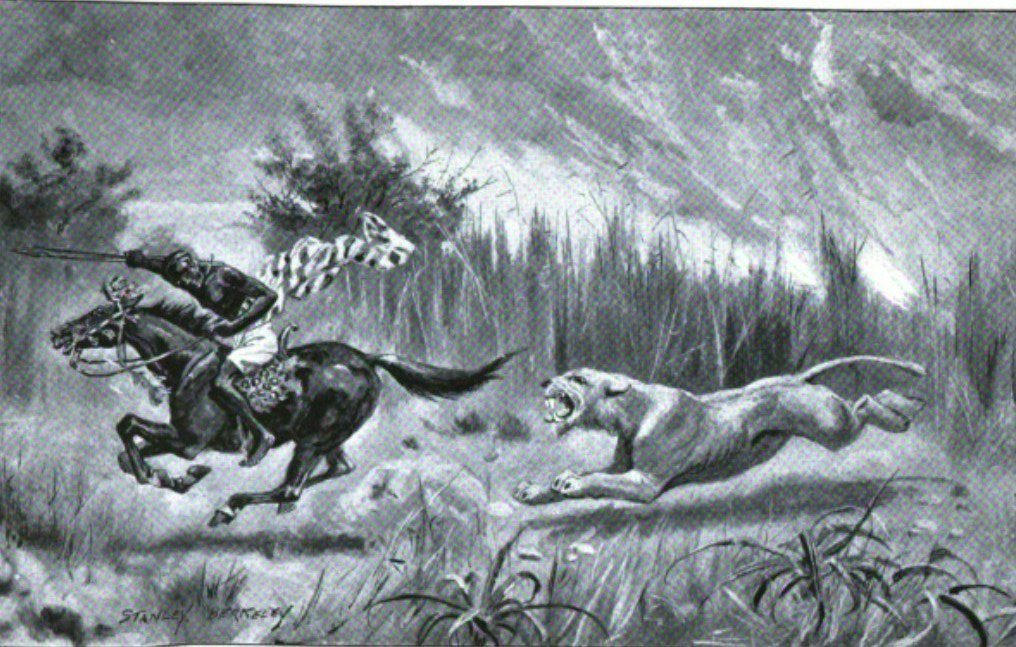
Hussein Hasan and Mangalool being chased by a lioness

Hussein's famed horse Mangalool was the topic of poetry and envy across Somaliland and many notables would inquire about how they could obtain the steed both Somalis and British alike. Hussein would accompany Lord Delamere in 1893 on a lion hunting expedition in which a lioness nearly killed him and his horse Mangalool in a pursuit they narrowly escaped. Hussein would refuse to put a price on Mangalool as he was nearly impossible to catch after raids and he made a great income off looting livestock from his enemies. He would run into Lord Delamere again in 1894 and narrated an amazing story that happened to him in the year since. Following a successful raid of numerous camels, Hussein had split from his party to avoid detection. Given that it was a particularly dry year Mangalool had collapsed from fatigue and could not continue any further. To rescue his horse, Hussein rushed his looted camels to the nearest wells and made them drink as much water as possible, before returning to Mangalool. He then slaughtered a camel periodically along the 20 mile route back to the safe well and would give Mangalool water from the camels he killed. He stated he would rather kill 100 camels than lose his horse, and that with Mangalool he'd easily gain many more camels than he slaughtered now that he had his horse back.

== See also ==
- Salaan Carrabey
- Sultan Deria Hassan
- Kite Fiqi
- Farah Nur
- Garhajis
- Isaaq
