= Suleiman Hassan Haddi =

9th and 11th Mayor Of Borama

Saleebaan Xasan Xaddi سليمان حسن حادي
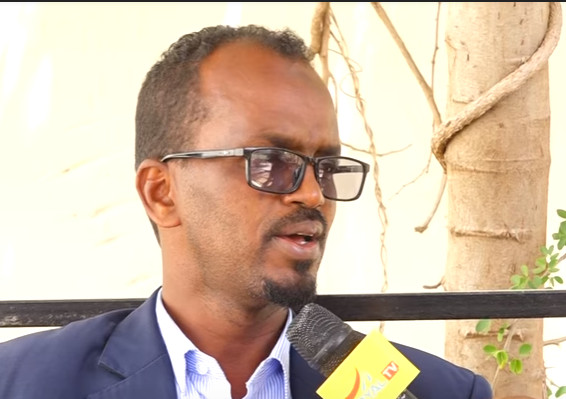

9th and 11th Mayor of Borama
- In office 29 September 2018 – 17 June 2021
- Preceded by: Mohamed Hassan Maidane
- Succeeded by: Mohamed Ahmed Warsame (Baradho)

Personal details
- Party: Kulmiye Peace, Unity, and Development Party

Suleiman Hassan Haddi (Somali: Saleebaan Xasan Xaddi) is a Somali politician. He is the former Mayor of Borama, the capital and the largest city of Awdal region of Somaliland, from 2018 to 2021.

== See also ==
- Mayor of Borama
- Borama

Political offices
Preceded by Mohamed Hassan Maidane	Mayor of Borama; 2012-2021	Succeeded by Mohamed Ahmed Warsame
