= Hamse Mohamed Abdi =

Somali politician

Hamse Mohamed Abdi حمزة محمد عبدي
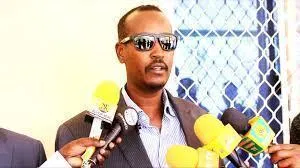

Governor of Togdheer
- Incumbent
- Assumed office 30 January 2018
- President: Muse Bihi Abdi
- Preceded by: Mohamoud Ali Suleiman

Hamse Mohamed Abdi (Somali: Xamse Maxamed Cabdi) is a Somali politician, who is currently serving as the Governor of Togdheer region of Somaliland since January 2018.

== See also ==
- Governor of Togdheer
- Togdheer Region

Political offices
Preceded by Mohamoud Ali Suleiman	Governor of Togdheer; 2018-present	Incumbent
