= The Stone Merchant =

2006 film directed by Renzo Martinelli

- Directed by: Renzo Martinelli
- Written by: Corrado Calabrò; Fabio Campus; Renzo Martinelli
- Produced by: Renzo Martinelli
- Starring: Harvey Keitel; Jane March; Jordi Molla; F. Murray Abraham
- Cinematography: Blasco Giurato
- Edited by: Osvaldo Bargero
- Music by: Pivio and Aldo De Scalzi
- Release date: 15 September 2006
- Language: Italian

The Stone Merchant (Italian: Il mercante di pietre) is a 2006 Italian thriller-drama film produced, written and directed by Renzo Martinelli and starring Harvey Keitel. It is based on the novel Ricordati di dimenticarla by Corrado Calabrò.

== Plot ==
Ludovico Vicedomini is a charismatic dealer in precious stones, at ease in both Europe and the Middle East. His charm makes him persuasive and well-liked, but it also conceals a dangerous secret: he and his business partner, Shahid, are planning a large-scale terrorist attack.

With the conspiracy almost ready, Ludovico meets Alceo and beautiful Leda, a married couple who enjoy holidays in Turkey. They do not suspect they are participating in a mysterious and deadly game with Ludovico and his partner.

However, fate takes hold of Ludovico, who becomes infatuated with Leda. She, receiving a precious ring from the merchant, must now choose between her husband and the mysterious man who fell in love with her.

== Cast ==
- Harvey Keitel as Ludovico Vicedomini
- Jane March as Leda
- Jordi Mollà as Alceo
- F. Murray Abraham as Shahid
- Bruno Bilotta as Libero
- Lucilla Agosti as Lidia
- Federica Martinelli as Rita
- Jonis Bashir as The Somali Terrorist
