= Aadil =

Masculine given name

Aadil is a male given name. Notable people with the name include:

- Aadil Ali (born 1994), English cricket player
- Aadil Assana (born 1993), Comorian football player
- Aadil Bedi (born 2001), Indian golfer
- Aadil Ameer Meea, Mauritian politician
- Aadil Manzoor Peer (born 1997), Indian ice stock sport athlete
- Aadil Rashid (born 1990), Indian cricketer
- Aadil Sheegow Sagaar, Somali politician
