= Sheikhnor Abikar Qassim =

Sheiknor Abukar Qassim (born 1961) is an outspoken Somali politician and businessman, and the founder of one of the largest democratic parties in southern Somalia, the Southern Somali Union. In 2000, Sheikhnor founded and became the President/CEO of a Rochester, Minnesota-based company called Primtec. Sheikhnor also co-founded an influential volunteer-based nonprofit organization called the Somali Institute of Peace Research (SIPR).
