= Liban Abdi Egal =

Somali entrepreneur

Liban Abdi Egal لبنان عبدي إيغال
- Born: Somalia
- Occupation: entrepreneur
- Title: Chairman of First Somali Bank

Liban Abdi Egal (Somali: Liibaan Cabdi Egaal, Arabic: ليبان عبدي إيغال) is a Somali entrepreneur. He is the founder and chairman of First Somali Bank (FSB), established in 2012.
