= Aden Ibrahim Aw Hirsi =

Somali politician

Adam Ibrahim Aw Hirsi ادم ابراهيم او حرسي

Director of Foresight for Practical Solutions - Somalia
- In office 2024–N/A

Minister of State for Environment & Climate Change - Somalia
- In office 2022–2024
- Prime Minister: Hamza Barre
- Preceded by: N/A
- Succeeded by: Ahmed Omar

Minister of Planning & International Cooperation - Jubaland State
- In office 2018–2020
- Preceded by: Osman Haji Feyrus

Minister of Justice Constitution & Religious Affairs - Jubaland State
- In office 2016–2018
- President: Ahmed Mohamed Islam
- Preceded by: Mohamed Abdi Mohamed

Senior Policy Advisor - Prime Minister's Office
- In office 2012–2016
- Prime Minister: Abdi Farah Shirdon; Abdiweli S. Ahmed, Omar Sharmarke
- Preceded by: position created
- Succeeded by: Mohamed Farah

The Governor of Gedo Region, Somalia
- In office 2006–2009
- President: Abdullahi Yusuf Ahmed
- Prime Minister: Ali M. Ghedi
- Preceded by: Hussein Abdi Ismail
- Succeeded by: Hussein Abdi Ismail

Personal details
- Born: 1978 (age 47–48) Gedo, Somalia

Adam Aw Hirsi (Somali: Aadam Aw Xirsi, Arabic: ادم او حرسي; born 1978) is a Somali politician and academic. The current Director of Foresight for Practical Solutions, he previously served as the Minister of State for Environment and Climate Change of Somalia, Minister of Planning and International Cooperation of Jubaland State, Minister of Justice, Constitution, and Religious Affairs of Jubaland State, among other important portfolios.

== Biography ==
Adam Ibrahim Aw Hirsi is the grandson of Sheikh Aw Hirsi, a well-known Qadiri Sufi leader. He was born in 1978 in the southern Gedo region of Somalia. Adam was born to Hafitha Sheikh Ali and Ibrahim Aw Hirsi in Baardheere district in December 1978. When he was growing up there, Sarinley was home to one of the best Koranic schools in the country, Moallim Ahmed Sarmaaleh's Koranic School. Also, present in Sarinley is the tomb of Sayyid Warsame Jama of the Qadiriyah order of Sufism.

== Education ==
He attended primary and secondary schools in Sarinley and Bardera. He spent a good part of his growing years in the Bardera District, where many of his family members and relatives have lived for generations.

Adam has a PhD in Social Sciences from Kenya Methodist University.

== Career ==
Earlier in life Adam was intrigued by the dynamics of languages. He focused mainly on Tafseer (Quran Translationin Arabic) and English Books. A few years later, he began his translation and interpreting career while still a teenager and in high school. He continued performing interpreting and relief jobs through much of the late 1990s. In this capacity, he had worked for CARE International and UNHCR as a local staff, and later co-founded SADO, a local non-profit organization.

Between 2003 and 2006, Aden taught English and Somali at Columbus State Community College in Columbus city of State of Ohio of The United States. In 2008, he cofounded SomaliCAN, an outreach and advocacy organization that provides services and information to Somalis in the United States of America and beyond.

=== Political career ===
In November 2006, President Abdullahi Yusuf of Transitional Federal Government (TFG) appointed him the governor of the Gedo region in Somalia. While in office, Governor Aw Hirsi, a former relief worker himself, persuaded numerous international relief organizations to open offices in the region. As a result, a number of disasters were averted. In the same year, Al-Shabaab, a local Islamist group unhappy with the presence of many foreign relief organizations in the region, declared its strong opposition to Aw Hirsi's popular administration. The group consequently orchestrated a peaceful way to frustrate and ultimately oust the governor by bankrolling Aw Hirsi's challenger, Hussein Ismail, the latter of whom then gathered a clan militia and threatened to start a civil war in the region.

In May 2008, faced with the dilemma of choosing between bloodshed and resignation from his gubernatorial post, Aw Hirsi resigned from office and enabled district-based local elections that would see Ismail assume governorship.

Since 2011, Aden has been a senior political adviser to Prime Ministers of Somalia, Dr. Abdi Farah Shirdon, Abdiweli Sheikh Ahmed Mohamed, Omar Abdirashid Sharmarke. Aw Hirsi resigned from Sharmarke's Office for unspecified reasons.

Aw Hirsi was appointed the minister of Justice constitution and religious affairs of Jubbaland state of Somalia in May 2016. In his capacity as the Minister of Justice... Aw Hirsi has been vital and instrumental in the Somali national projects. He was the lead Jubaland person in Somalia elections 2016/17.

== Literary career ==
As a writer, Aw Hirsi has authored numerous books and glossaries including:

- Queen Arraweloh's Mean Throne: Translation, 2001 (Story)
- The Somali Court Interpreter, 2005
