= Saynab Qayad =

Somali politician

Politician
- Leader: The Parliament's commission on human rights

Personal details
- Citizenship: Somali

Saynab Qayad is a Somali politician, and was a member of the Transitional Federal Parliament. She was the chair of the Parliament's commission on human rights. Saynab was staying at the Muna Hotel in Mogadishu when it was attacked by Islamist militants in 2010.
