= Soraya Miré =

Somali film director, writer and activist

- Born: 1961 (age 64–65); Beledweyne
- Citizenship: Somali
- Occupations: filmmaker; director; Activist
- Known for: Fire Eyes
- Notable work: The Girl with Three Legs

Soraya Miré (born 1961) is a Somali writer, filmmaker and activist against female genital mutilation.

== life ==
Soraya Miré was born at Beledweyne. Aged thirteen, she endured female genital infibulation. Miré's' documentary film Fire Eyes (1994) began with Miré recalling her own experience of FGM, and included interviews with a range of others involved with the practice.

== Works ==
=== Films ===
- Fire Eyes: Female Circumcision, 1994

=== Books ===
- (with Eve Ensley) The Girl with Three Legs: A Memoir, 2011
