= Mayor of Berbera =

Head of the government of Berbera

- Incumbent; Abdishakur Mohamoud Hassan since 20 December 2012
- Style: Mr Mayor (formally)
- Seat: Berbera City Hall

The Mayor of Berbera is the executive of the municipal government in Berbera City and the surrounding city's territory administration. The current mayor is Abdishakur Mohamoud Hassan, who took office on 20 December 2012.

== List of mayors ==
Portrait	Name	Somali name	Term of office		
Portrait	Name	Somali name	Took office	Left office	Time in office
	Hassan Haji Mohamoud	Xasan Xaaji Maxamuud Warsame (Xasan-Gadhwayne)	1988	2003	15 years
	Abdalle Sandheere	Maxamed Cali Carab (Cabdale Sandheere)	2003	20 December 2012	9 years
	Abdishakur Mohamoud Hassan	Cabdishakuur Maxamuud Xasan Ciddin	20 December 2012	Incumbent	13 years, 318 days

== See also ==
- Mayor of Hargeisa
- Mayor of Burao
- Mayor of Borama
- Mayor of Las Anod
- Mayor of Erigavo
