= Mohamed Hassan Maidane =

Somali politician

Mohamed Hussein Maidane محمد حسين ميدنى
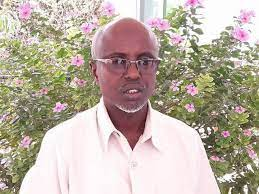

10th Mayor of Borama
- In office 24 June 2015 – 29 September 2018
- Preceded by: Suleiman Hassan Haddi
- Succeeded by: Suleiman Hassan Haddi

Personal details
- Party: Peace, Unity, and Development Party

Mohamed Hussein Maidane (Somali: Maxamed Xuseen Maydhane, Arabic: محمد حسين ميدنى) is a Somali politician. He was the Mayor of Borama, the capital and the largest city of Awdal region in Somaliland.

== Career ==
Maidane is a member of the Peace, Unity, and Development Party (Kulmiye), the ruling political association in the Somaliland region. Maidane was elected as replacement leader on June 24, 2015 by 13 municipal councilors.
