= First Somali Bank =

Somali bank

- Company type: Private company
- Industry: Financial services
- Founded: 2012; 14 years ago
- Defunct: 2016
- Fate: Unknown
- Headquarters: Mogadishu, Somalia
- Key people: Liban Abdi Egal
- Products: Loans, debit cards, money transfer and retail banking
- Website: www.firstsomalibank.com

The First Somali Bank (FSB) was a Somali commercial bank headquartered in Mogadishu, Somalia. The bank provided bank accounts, loans and debit cards as well as money transfer services.

== History ==
FSB was established in May 2012 by Liban Abdi Egal. It was the first commercial bank to open in southern Somalia since 1991.

An Islamic financial institution, the bank offered personal banking, commercial banking, agency banking, mobile banking and internet banking. It also provided money transfer services to clients.

In mid-2012, the First Somali Bank organized its first ever Technology, Entertainment, Design (TEDx) conference. The event was launched to showcase improvements in local business, development and security to potential Somali and international investors.

Albert Falck was the first CEO of the bank from January 2012 to end of June 2012. He managed the product portfolio creation and launch of the bank.

The banks website was closed in 2016.

== See also ==
- Central Bank of Somalia
