= Mayor of Borama =

Head of the government of Borama

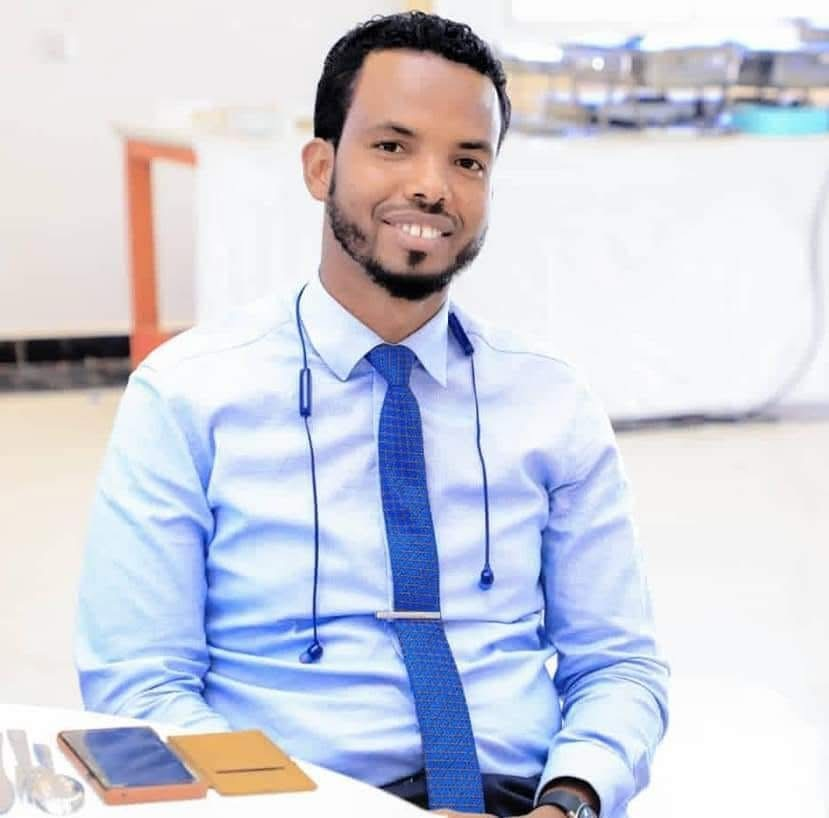
- Incumbent; Mohamoud Sh. Ibrahin Muse since 08 May 2025
- Style: Mr Mayor (formally)
- Member of: Borama Municipal Council
- Seat: Borama City Hall
- Deputy: Ahmed Ali Haddi

The Mayor of Borama is head of the executive branch of Borama City, the capital of Awdal region. The current mayor is Mohamoud Sh. Ibrahin Muse, who was elected on 8 May, 2025.

== List of mayors ==
| # | Party | Portrait | Name | Somali name | Term of office | | |
| # | Party | Portrait | Name | Somali name | Took office | Left office | Time in office |
|---|---|---|---|---|---|---|---|
| 1 | Independent | | Magan | | 1992 | 1998 | |
| 2 | UDUB | | Isse Ahmed Nour | Ciise Axmed Nuur | 1998 | 2002 | |
| 3 | UDUB | | Abdirhman Omar | Cabdiraxmaan Cumar | 2002 | 2007 | |
| 3 | UDUB | | Abdirahman Shide Billeh | Cabdiraxmaan shide bille | 2007 | 2012 | |
| 4 | KULMIYE | | Suleiman Hassan Haddi | Saleebaan Xasan Xaddi | 2012 | 2015 | |
| 5 | WADANI | | Mohamed Hassan Maidane; Resigned | Maxamed Xuseen Maydhane | 24 June 2015 | 29 September 2018 | 3 years, 97 days |
| 4 | KULMIYE | | Suleiman Hassan Haddi | Saleebaan Xasan Xaddi | 30 September 2018 | 17 June 2021 | 2 years, 260 days |
| 6 | WADANI | | Mohamed Ahmed Warsame | Maxamed Axmed Warsame | 17 June 2021 | 03 August 2024 | 3 years, 0 days |
| 7 | KULMIYE | | Mustafe Farah Qabile | Mustafe Faarax Qabile | 03 August 2024 | 08 May 2025 | 278 days |
| 8 | WADANI | | Mohamoud Sh. Ibrahin Muse | Maxamuud Sh. ibrahim Muuse | 08 May 2025 | present | 1 year, 122 days |

== See also ==
- Mayor of Berbera
- Mayor of Burao
- Mayor of Erigavo
- Mayor of Hargeisa
- Mayor of Las Anod
