= Salaan Carrabey =

Famous Somali poet (1850–1943)

Salaan Mahamud Hirsi Salaan Carrabey
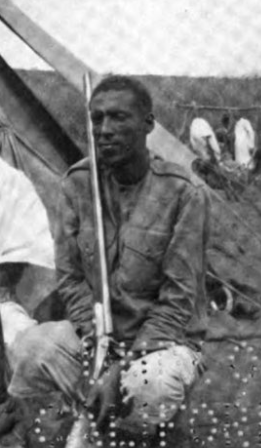
- Salaan Carrabey in an expedition near Berbera, 1897
- Born: 1850; Beer,
- Died: 1943 (aged 92–93); Burao, British Somaliland
- Occupation: Poet

Salaan Mahamud Hirsi (Somali: Salaan Maxamuud Xirsi, Arabic: سلام محمود حرسي) (1850 – 1943), better known as Salaan Carrabey, was a famous poet from the Adan Madoba sub-division of the Habr Je'lo Isaaq clan.

== Early life ==
Salaan was born in 1850 in the town of Beer, Isaaq Sultanate. He completed his Qur'anic education in Beer after which he married a woman of the Ahmed Garad/Dhulbahante clan and worked as a merchant trading in Aden, India and East Africa. He was a polyglot, learning many languages throughout his career as a merchant, including Arabic, English, Swahili, Hindustani, and Amharic.

== Poetry ==
Salaan's poetry is very rich and he was a notable figure and participant in the most famous chain of Somali poetry known as the Guba series in which legendary Isaaq and Darood poets traded boastful and sharp verses. He incorporated his knowledge of Arabic, English, Swahili and Hindustani into his poetry. Somali scholar and linguist Musa Haji Ismail Galal recorded many of his works.

=== Mayn ===
Salaan had left Burao for several months after and upon his return the locals asked him to recite something. His response was this poem Mine

Haddaad dhimato geeridu mar bay nolosha dhaantaaye
Dhaqashiyo kol bay kaa yihiin dhereggu xaaraane
Dheddigaansho waa ceeb in aad dhamaqsataa meele
Dhadhan malaha Aadmigu wuxuu kugu dhalliilaaye
Nin dhirbaaxo quudheed dugsadey dhaqayadeed maalye
Dhashaaday sugtaa xaajadaad dhawrataa abide
Ma dhurmuminin Qaabiil kolkuu dhacayey Haabiile
Dhibaad-jiid haween buu ka kacay dhiriftankoodiiye
Dheddigoodku Aadmiga horay uga dhawaajeene

— Salaan Carrabey Mayn
Translation:

When you die sometimes death is better than life
Raising livestock and feeling satisfied sometimes are forbidden to you
That you assume the ways of womanhood somewhere is a shame
Humans have no taste for what people disapprove of in them
A man who allows people to do what they want to him will milk the consequences of that
Your offspring will forever inherit the situation you bring about
Cain was not restrained when he fell upon Abel
Their anger with each other rose out of taking the fiancée
Problems due to women always cried out to men in the past

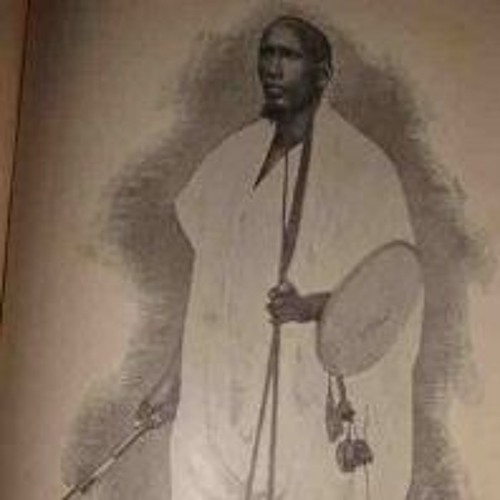
Salaan Carrabey

=== War Toolow Colka Jooja ===
Heavy infighting broke out between the Ahmed Farah and Rer Dahir subclans, both belonging to the wider Nuux subclan of the Habr Je'lo. The conflict had been going on for a long time, and no one had been able to put an end to it. Finally, the two subclans resolved to settle the dispute by battle, as is customary among Somali people. As the warriors gathered on the battleground, a famous and respected Sheikh named Fiqi Hasan, walked between them, reading from the Qu'ran while simultaneously translating verses from it for his audience, to remind them of the devastating results of conflict between relatives, as well as reminding the warring parties of their duties in Islam. One of the men responded by striking the Qur'an out of Hasan's hands and Salaan stepped forward telling the Sheikh that he spoke a language that these men understood (poetry). He then proceeded to recite a now-famous poem of his in geeraar style, titled War Toolow Colka Jooja (Oh Clansmen, Stop the War, or Oh! Kinsmen Stop the War):

Labadiinatan curee
Isu coobba ridaaya
Cod yar baan u lahaa
Shantii ceeriga tiilliyo
Curadkii habartay iyo
Cali-Fiin ma ilaawin
Rabjaan baydin cayaayir
Caado dhaaf u disheenoo
Caday loo jebin maanta
Jaamacii calmanaayee
Codkar noogu horreeyiyo
Canlana waa is ogayn
Cidna waysu xignaa
Ciilna waysu qabnaa
Haddii aad is cuntaanna
Idin caabuddan maynnee
Waa intoon mid la ciidmiyoo
Ka kaleeto ku ciiriyoo
Waa si ay ciddidaydu
Calooshay ku jabtaayoon
Anna ciil iyo way iyo
Cadho aan u dhintaayoo
Cududdaydu laciiftee
Wada cawdi-billaystoo
Waar tolow colka jooja!

— Salaan Carrabey Waar Tolow Colka Jooja!
Translation:

For you two clans
I have a few words
I have not forgotten those five at (the desolate place of) Ceer
The first born of my clan
And Cali Fiin
You killed Rabjaan in revelry
And in transgression of custom
And up to today a stick has not been broken for him
And we remember well-known Jaamac
Who was the first in oratory for us
We know about what happened in the past
No one is more close to each other than us
And yet there is anger between us
If you devour each other
I won’t respect you
It’s as much as I’ll join forces with one (side)
And join in the attack on the other
It is as if my fingernails are
Cutting up my stomach
And I shall die of anger
And grief and rage
My upper arms (my clan ) will become weak
So say together ‘I seek protection from God’
Oh clansmen stop the war!

After Salaan concluded the geeraar Oh Clansmen, Stop the War, one of the intermediary elders, Baashe Shabeelle, told him that what he had just recited was not a gabay, and told him to recite something among the men or leave the battlefield. In response, Salaan then composed the famous poem, Kinship is a Shelter:

Baashoow daliil gabay ma jiro nin igu doorshaaye
Halka doyna laga naadiyaan duunka weriyaaye
Dux markaan ka garan waayey baan daayey waayadane
Kol baan diririyaa sida cirkoo da’i kaliilaaye
Xaluun baan digriyey sida wadaad diin u haajiraye
Dabuubtaan la yeedhona Rabbaa duusha weligeede
Waa daabac aan go’in midkaan duco bilaabaaye
Daad-xoorta iyo mawjaddaan kala dabbaalaayo
Dacartaan wadnuhu hayn karayn daari feedhaha’e
Waa daafa-yaridii horee aan idin deeqsiiyo
Dibna waxaan u idhi xaajo waa dux iyo hawraare
Maansada Colaadda Iyo Nabadda
Reer Faaraxeer kala durkee kala duddaynaaya
Aan u digo Ducaale iyo Seed ha igu diideene
Duuggeeda belo waa helaa nin u dedaalaaye
Nimanyahow tolnimo waa dugsiye dunida jeedaasha

Dunjiga Nuux-Ismaaciil tashiga daaha laga saarye
Degaha Reer Axmeda wiilashii timirta diiqaayey
Xasan dabadii Reer Jaamacii kala dabayl raacay
Aroos dama dammaashad iyo naas daawashada geedka
Dibno hadal ka yimid baa Cag-Geel loogu daw galaye
Deelqaaf fagaaraa Ibleys kugu dukhuulaaye
Nimanyahow tolnimo waa dugsiye dunida jeedaasha

Dalaalkuu laqwiyey Reer Shirdoon danafsigii eedye
Dalanboobigii Dhamal wuxuu damac lahaa leefye
Bah Gadabiirsi danab baa ku dhacay dimishigii qoofe
Nin dorraad lumiyo naagihii dulube ooyaayey
Sidii Ina Dagaal loo khatalay idinka diimmoone
Reer Geeddigii debedda maray daadi amarkiiye
Nimanyahow tolnimo waa dugsiye dunida jeedaasha

Reer Sugulle dakhar wiil yar bow siday dubaaqdiiye
Waatii degmada laysu furay Dabadi Looyaane
Dulmi hadduu qabsaday Eebbeheen Daayinaa jira’e
Dubaaqi qabriga howga tudho dabaqi naareede
Dummaddii Xirsuu saaran yahay Dubur raggii yiille
Doolaabadii boqor hadduu damacsanaa waaye
Dabar-qaaday Reer Diiriyii damaca waallaaye
Duudsuu ku dhacay Ina Ammaan dib u heshiintiiye
Nimanyahow tolnimo waa dugsiye dunida jeedaasha

Reer Cali-Geraysugu darraa dil iyo qoomaale
Dakanadii qabaalkii raggii dumayey qoomeeye
Waa dawri Buuhoodlahay dir u lahaayeene
Waaya dambe dabataa fadhidey daallinoo col ahe
Durba waranka waysugu dhakhsaday dooxanaa marane
Ma deg-dego nin dirirtii ogaa dooxadii Garabe
Ku dibsade Daboolan iyo Caday danabadii yiile
Dabkuu Aadan shiday Ina Galaydh durugsigii waaye
Dambarkeeda dhaxal xaajaduu doortay Reer Gorode
Nin dardaarankii Cumar hayaa mudanihiis daaye
Nimanyahow tolnimo waa dugsiye dunida jeedaasha

Maansada Colaadda Iyo Nabadda
Ararsame dulmaa kala qabsaday dirirtii Caymeede
Daaroodba maqal xaajadii daahirka ahayde
Dadku hadduu ka nixi Reer Wacays delebshaxii raacye
Tukaha lagama dedin wiilashii wada daboollaaye
Ma duugine sidii bay lafuhu debed u yaalliine
Deris waxa aqbalay reerihii dawladda ahaaye
Markuu sheekh cilmiga daakiraa fiqi duceeyaaye
Diintana wadaad kama aflaxo xaqa ka doodaaye
Kol ay deeradiyo cawsha tahay doqontu waa quuse
Iyana way is doontaan kolkay kala dibboodaane
Duunyadatan kama liidataan daaqi geedaha’e
Nimanyahow tolnimo waa dugsiye dunida jeedaasha

Dayax soo iftiimiyo qoftaad dahabka moodaysey
Wax Dallaayad laysugu rogmaday darabkii saarraaye
Jeeroo dabriyo lays markaday dooyo iyo weerar
Cali diid halkaan maalintaa dawga ku ahayne
Daaqiyadda mawdkii dhadhami wuu durraansadaye
Bah Idarays ma deyin Reer Jibriil digasho loolkiiye
Ninna Faarax kama daawo gelin xaalkii loo dilaye
Dugaag baa hirqaday feedhihii daribta weynaaye
Col dareeray duulkiyo lallabo dirayo Shayddaanku
Danabayska nimankii badnaa duraha Jiilaalka
Dawriyaha Reer Muusihii dad u itaal sheegtay
Daleelii Wareeg baa la dhigay duco qabeenkiiye
Nimanyahow tolnimo waa dugsiye dunida jeedaasha

La dalleensey Nuux-Maxamedkii idinku dayraaye
Daaraha la ridey Soolomadow dumarka ooyaaya
Dugayeeyda naagaha hablaha debedda meeraaya
Haddaan deyey dayaca Reer Barroow daran ammuurtaase
War sow kama diqootaan ilmada dibiqle guudkooda
Dalkii waxa xukuma Reer Warsame dixida weynaaye
Imminkay degmada soo fureen darantii Tiigeede
Duddo reerka loo dhigay haddii degel la waaheelo
Duleedkaa mus laga joojiyaa debedda dhawreede
Ragna mudanihiisow dugsiya dah iyo gaashaane
Meeshii dalleenaa libaax dagi ka eegtaaye
Magacna waa diboo dhalashadii loo demeli waaye
Yaan idin diq-diqin waano aan durina aafayne
Damba kama leh Reer Faaraxaan docoginaayaaye
Wax belaayo lagu diimiyaa duul ku waajibaye
Maansada Colaadda Iyo Nabadda

Colkan Habar-Jeclada loola dudi daw kalow furane
Allow yaa carruurahan durdurin kala dillaameeya

Translation:

Oh Baashe there is no man better than me in the indications of the gabay
In a far place what I have spoken about is announced
When I perceived no salve I looked at these times
Now I’m in a dirir time like the sky which will pour the kaliil rain
Just last night I recited like a religious man who has mastered religion
And the argument I’m calling with, God will make it fly for ever
It is an unbroken pronouncement, the one I begin with a prayer
I swim between the foamy flood water and the wave [of the poem]
The aloe which the heart cannot contain will strike the ribs
It is the food for a past guest which I give generously to you
And then what I said for the matter in hand is a salve and a
proposition
Those Reer Faarax who went apart setting up their own separate enclosures
Let me advise Ducaale and Seed, let them not refuse me
A man who strives for it will find the consequences of calamity
Oh men, kinship is a shelter, so look at the world

The whole of the Nuux Ismaaciil had the advice covered from them
The finest of Reer Axmed the young men who were satiated with dates
After [the death of] Xasan, the Reer Jaamac went apart following the wind
At a full wedding with festivities and eyeing the livestock from under the tree
Because of speech that came out of his lips Cag-Geel was ambushed
Ibleys brought bad speech to you in the meeting place
Oh men, kinship is a shelter, so look at the world

Through brokerage in tactless speech, the Reer Shirdoon lost their aspirations
At the battle of Dhamal any intention which they had was lost
Thunder fell among the Bah Gadabiirsi the fearful cowards
A man who died the day before yesterday and the women who went around weeping
Like Ina Dagaal who was tricked you are ignorant
The Reer Geeddi who passed outside [of their land] and scattered the orders
Oh men, kinship is a shelter, so look at the world

The bitterness of the Reer Sugulle was brought by a head wound from a young boy
Here is the place where they settled, Dabadi Looyaan
If there was injustice there, our ever lasting God exists [to relieve it]
May he be merciful to him in the grave saving him the level of fire
Xirsi is responsible for Dubur where men were lying dead
If he wanted the lineages of a king, he lacked them
The Reer Diiriye calmed down from their mad intentions
It was agreed no blood money would be paid when Ina Ammaan fell
Oh men, kinship is a shelter, so look at the world

The Reer Cali Geri were brought down with killing and
wounding
The fault of the wooden watering trough mobilized the men and they regretted it
Buuhoodle now has no people, the place they had been for generations
Recently hunters settled there, an oppressor who’s an enemy
Already they hurried upon each other with hollow tipped spears
A man who knew of the battle at the dry river bed of Garab would not hurry
They held back after the thunders of Daboolan and Caday
Through the fire which Aadan lit, Ina Galaydh didn’t get what he wanted
The matter which the Reer Gorod chose left its consequences
A man who has the testament of Cumar knows his worthiness
Oh men, kinship is a shelter, so look at the world

Difficulties brought the Ararsame apart at the conflict of Cayn
All the Daarood heard of the matter which was clear
As the people were startled at the Reer Wacays who entered [into conflict] as a game
The [dead] young men, all covered [with pride] were not concealed from the crows
They didn’t bury them so their bones were just left in the open
They were accepted as neighbours by the reers who had good governance
While a sheekh studies religious knowledge the fiqi prays
A religious man does not proceed in religion if he disputes the truth
Whether a gazelle or an oryx, the fool gives up
They [the animals, at least] look out for each other when they flee apart [from a predator]
You are the same as these animals just chewing plants
Oh men, kinship is a shelter, so look at the world

The woman you think is golden or lit up by a full moon
They turned each other over because of Dallaayad and her beautiful body
Until they fought each other with ambush, war parties and attack
Cali refused that day the path that we were on with regard to that matter
He wanted to taste the flavour of death
The Bah Idarays did not leave alone the gloating of their struggle
And no one glanced at Faarax and the situation he was killed for
Wild animals had their fill of the big meat on his ribs
A fighting group which spread out the many people and fire which Satan sent
The slaughter of the many men at the time of Jiilaal
The Reer Muuse, beggars, people who had called themselves strong
Were put down in the open area of Wareeg, those important men
Oh men, kinship is a shelter, so look at the world

The poor people saw the weakness of the Nuux Maxamed and exploited it
The houses of the Soolomadow were destroyed, the women who cry
The wailing of the women, the girls who wandered about in foreign lands
If I have considered the neglectful things [you want to do] Oh Reer Barre it’s very bad
Hey, don’t you have feeling for the girls with falling tears on their cheeks?
The Reer Warsame land and the large grassy area
Now they have opened up the settlement where the plants of Tiig grow
If a long term encampment is enclosed and a further fence put around where the homestead has been set up
Then the space is blocked off with a thick thornbush to protect against marauders [both animal and human]
Of men the respected ones are those who protect, a cover and a shield
In the unprotected place a lion can see a weak point
A name lives on, and who one is born to cannot be changed
Let me not force on you advice which is nothing but futile
The Reer Faarax are indifferent, the ones I’m imploring
Those to whom it was necessary are being forced with something formidable

So to the people who wanted to attack the Habar Jaclo another path is open
Oh God, let these children not stampede, make them separate

It was said that when Salaan Carrabay had finished the poem that the two enemies, impressed by their kinsman’s appeal, disengaged and went their separate ways, avoiding further bloodshed.

=== Haadaaqsi ===
Following a string of Habr Je'lo victories over the Dhulbahante in which they had captured many wells and reduced their opponents to a pitiful state, Salaan Carrabey composed this boastful poem called Haadaaqsi. The most important victory was the capture of the famous well of Caynabo. Hadaaqsi forms part of the Guba series.

Goortaan hadhkaba kaa eryaad hawd u cararteene
Waa kaa hubkii sida raggii wada hareednaaye
Habarwaana waa kaa hingilan labadii haamoode
Shirsooruhuba hoy maleh kuwaad hilib wadaagtaane
Waa kaa hayaankii ku dhacay Hoobayiyo xeebe
Ararsame ma haybsado Nugaal hogashadii ceele
Hanas iyo abaar kulu adoo habaqle soo guurey
Caynaba hadhuub kama dartaan hoga kaliileede
Ka hulleele Hagar aadankii hoobalayn jiraye
Aduunbaa hayaayda u guntane heeryo lagu saarye
Hooyaalayntaan kaga badshaa haybad iyo luuqe
Haasaasahaa laga gartaa hagar la'aaneede
Mar haddaan hullaabta iska rogo soo hankaabsadaye
An hawadiyo hoosada Burciyo Herer ka geeyeene
Kuma hiilo heeliga fulaa la handabeeyaaye
Anse wacan haagaag uga marshaa heel la ii wacaye

— Salaan Carrabey Haadaaqsi
Translation:

When I had chased you from the region where there is shade, you ran away to the Hawd
And (yet) here are (your) young bearded men carrying arms
The two sections of the Habarwaa are in clothes of mourning
The Shirshoore, who are of the same flesh as you, homeless
Indeed they had to trek towards Hobyo and the coast
The Ararsame do not (even dare to) inquire about Nugaal and watering at the wells
In the heat of the sun, suffering fierce thirst, you trudged along wearily
You do not even take one vessel of water from Aynaba in the heat of the kaliil
The Hagar Aadan who used to chant (to their camels, while watering them) have moved out from there
And you who tell people to rally, the mat pack saddle (of humiliation) has been put
In reciting poetry I excel others by (my) distinctive style and chant
One can recognize (good) diction by (its) effortless ease
Once I throw off the upper part of (my) clothes (preparing for a fight), I am firm and resolute
Let me pour out (poetry) and let people take it to the glades of Bur'o and to Herer
A coward who is criticised has no courage at an assembly
But I speak openly and straight to the point at a meeting especially convened for me

=== Tolnimo Wa Dugsiye ===
Carrabey in his poem Tolnimo Wa Dugsiye (Kinship is a Shelter) notes many internal conflicts some of the decades prior and others that were ongoing. He preaches that kinship is in fact a bond and source of strength that should be valued. One such conflict he notes was fighting between kindred sections of the Habr Yunis. The powerful Sultan Hersi Aman caused much devastation when he attempted to become even more absolutist, eventually dying at the hands of his own clan in battle.

Reer Sugulle dakhar wiilyar baw sidey daliishiiye
Waatii degmada laysu furay Dabadi Looyaane
Dummaddii Xirsuu saaran yahay Dubur raggii yiile
Dawlaabadii boqor hadduu damacsanaa waaye
Dabar qaaday Reer Diiriyihi, damaca waallaaye
Duudsuu ku dhacay ina Ammaan dib u heshiintiiye
Denbi hadduu kasbaday Eebbeheen daayinaa jirae
Dullaamkii Qabriga hawga tudho dabaqi naareede
Ballo duugeeda waa helaa nin u daalaaye
Nimanyahow tolnimo waa dugsiye, dunida jeedaashe

— Salaan Carrabey Tolnimo Wa Dugsiye
Translation:

The bitterness of the Reer Sugule was brought by a head wound from a young boy
Here is the place where they settled, Dabadi Looyaan
Xirsi is responsible for Dubur (battle) where men were lying dead
If he wanted the lineages (successors) of a king, he lacked them
The Reer Diiriye calmed down from their mad intentions
It was agreed no blood money would be paid when Ina Ammaan fell
If there was injustice there, our ever lasting God exists [to relieve it]
May he be merciful to him in the grave saving him the level of fire
Oh men, kinship is a shelter, so look at the world

== Death ==
Salaan died in 1943 in Burao, Somaliland).

== See also ==
- Mohamed Nur Fadal
- Musa Haji Ismail Galal
- Kite Fiqi
- Farah Nur
- Cali Dhuux
- Hersi Aman
- Hussein Hasan
