= Halima Ahmed =

Somali political activist

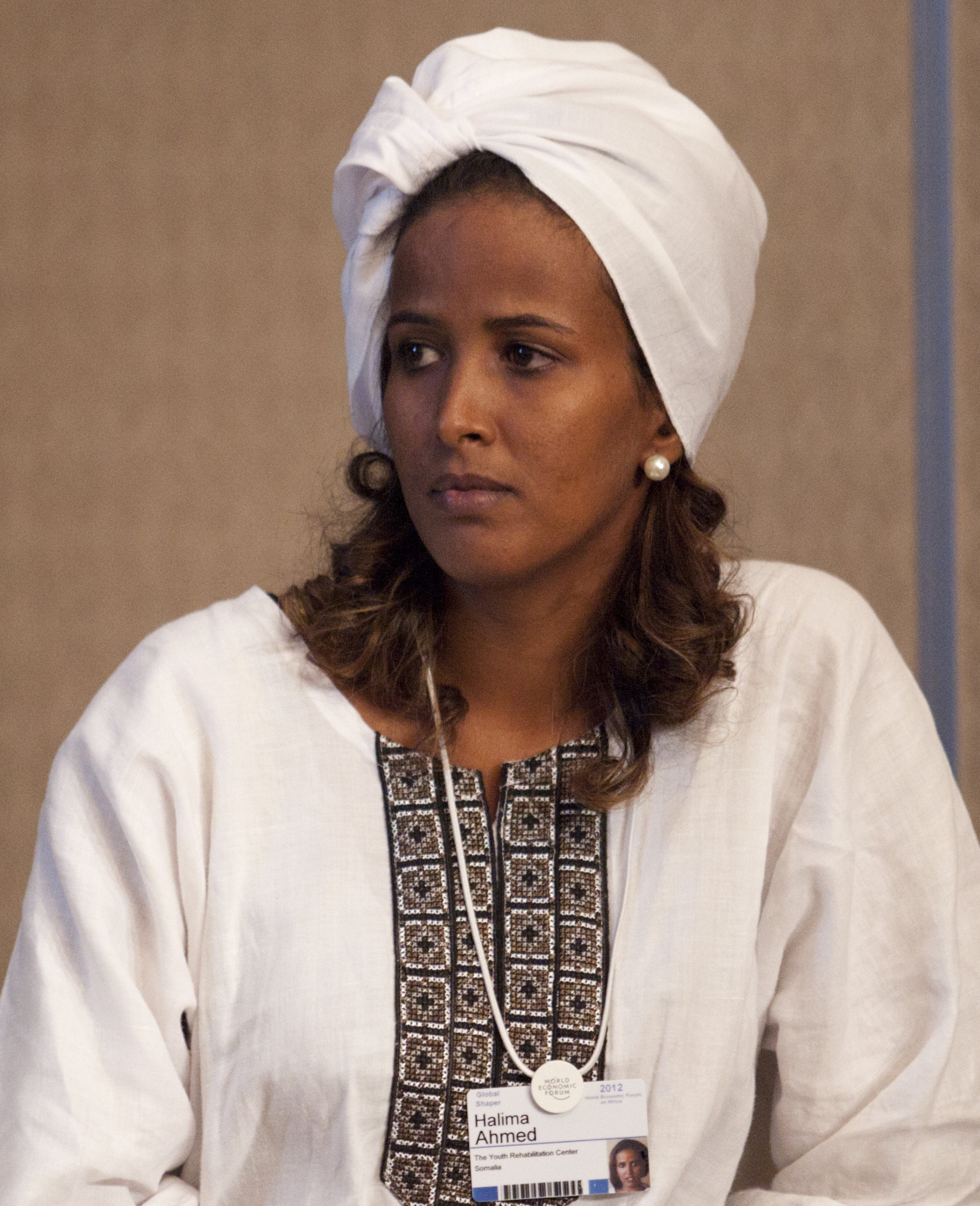
- Halima Ahmed at the 2012 World Economic Forum in Addis Ababa.
- Born: Xaliima Axmed; Somalia
- Education: Geneva School of Diplomacy and International Relations
- Occupation: Political activist

Halima Ahmed (Somali: Xaliima Axmed) is a Somali political activist.

== Personal life ==
Ahmed was born in Somalia. For her post-secondary education, she earned a Bachelor of Arts degree in International Relations from the Geneva School of Diplomacy and International Relations.

== Career ==
Ahmed began her career with the Youth Rehabilitation Center in Mogadishu, Somalia's capital. Her duties there included taking care of insurgents that had defected to join the Somali government.

She later became a prospective candidate in the new Federal Parliament of Somalia, which was inaugurated in August 2012.

== See also ==
- Hodan Ahmed
