= Farhiyo Farah Ibrahim =

Somali social activist

Farhiyo Farah Ibrahim العبارة فرح إبراهيم
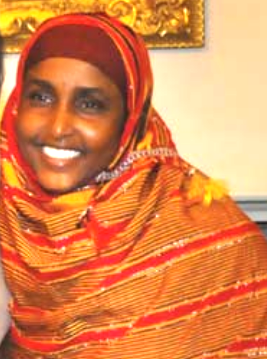
- Ibrahim in 2008
- Born: 1982 or 1983 (age 43–44); Somalia
- Occupations: activist, interpreter

Farhiyo Farah Ibrahim (Somali: Farxiyo Faarax Ibraahim, Arabic: العبارة فرح إبراهيم) is a Somali social activist and interpreter. She is an advocate for women's rights and reproductive health.

== Personal life ==
Ibrahim was born between 1982 and 1983 in Somalia. During the civil war that broke out in the early 1990s, her grandfather was killed by armed militants and her mother was assaulted. She subsequently moved to Kenya in 1992, living in the UNCHR refugee compound in Dadaab.

After finishing eighth grade, Ibrahim left school to support her kin. She was later estranged from her family after refusing to marry a much older man.

Ibrahim is a Muslim.

== Career ==
In 2002, Ibrahim worked as a reproductive health motivator for the National Council of Churches in Kenya. She therein promoted voluntary counseling and testing for HIV/AIDS as well as contraceptive use, and campaigned against female genital mutilation. The nature of her counseling work was a source of tension with her family and the wider, socially conservative Somali community, who felt that it was unbecoming of her background. Due to pressure, Ibrahim eventually quit her job at the NCCK.

As of 2008, Ibrahim serves as an interpreter. She also advocates for the rights of women and girls.

== Awards ==
In 2008, Ibrahim was presented the International Women of Courage Award for her advocacy work.
