= Hodan Ahmed =

Somali political activist

Hodan Ahmed هودان أحمد
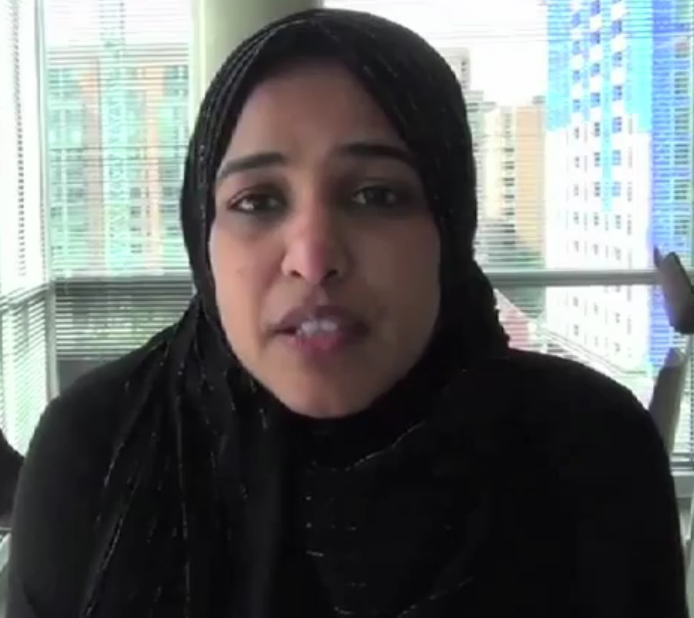
- Born: Somalia
- Occupation: Political activist
- Title: Senior Program Officer at the National Democratic Institute

Hodan Ahmed (Somali: Hodan Axmed; Arabic: هودان أحمد) is a Somali political activist. She helped form the Somali Women Parliamentary Association the Transitional Federal Parliament of Somalia, which was succeeded by the Federal Parliament of Somalia. She serves as a Senior Program Officer at the National Democratic Institute.

== Personal life ==
Ahmed was born in Somalia. After the start of the civil war in 1991, she and her family emigrated abroad.

Ahmed lived for a period in India. She later studied in Kenya.

In 2003, she returned to Somalia, traveling to the capital Mogadishu. Ahmed's visit there inspired her to devote her career to helping rebuild the country.

== Career ==
Professionally, Ahmed initially worked with the United Nations Population Fund and Norwegian People's Aid. She later branched out, aiming to move beyond awareness-raising on key issues to finding sustainable political solutions for the Somali parliament.

In 2009, during workshops organized by the National Democratic Institute (NDI), Ahmed in conjunction with other Somali women civil society representatives and MPs established the Somali Women Parliamentary Association (SOWPA). It was the first women's caucus in the Somali Transitional Federal Parliament.

In 2010, Ahmed officially joined the NDI, where she assisted the Somali Transitional Federal Government's legislative strengthening program. The project provided training to women MPs in Somalia on parliamentary standards and protocols. It also brought together female parliamentarians and civil society representatives to advocate for women's issues. These collective efforts helped shape provisions within the new Federal Constitution, which was adopted in August 2012. Ahmed concurrently provided support for women political leaders to lobby for political representation. These efforts in turn culminated in a provision within Somalia's transitional roadmap process to reserve at least 30 percent of seats for women in the new Federal Parliament.

Under the aegis of the NDI's Andi Parhamovich Fellowship, Ahmed in 2013 worked for three months in Washington, D.C. She developed a program to equip women with the requisite leadership skills for participation in Somali politics and the post-conflict reconstruction process. Over the course of the fellowship, she also met with U.S. lawmakers and their staff, women's organizations, and the executive director of the Women Legislators of the Maryland General Assembly to learn effective strategies to improve cohesiveness between female MPs and civil society officials, including identifying areas of common concern and forming advocacy coalitions. Among these conferences was a keynote address by Ahmed in April 2013 at Marietta College's McDonough Leadership Center, as well as a speech the following month at the NDI's Madeleine K. Albright Grant Luncheon.

In June 2013, Ahmed returned to her NDI Somalia office to begin implementing her program. She is developing a training manual for Somali women MPs on basic government functions and leadership skills. She also hopes to hold workshops for women, and is working on improving equitable access to legislative training opportunities.

== Awards ==
In 2013, Ahmed was presented the Andi Parhamovich Fellowship. The annual award is given to a young woman from the NDI or its partner organizations in 65 different nations who strengthens democratic institutionalization in her respective country through advancing female participation in politics.

== See also ==
- Halima Ahmed
