= Farah Nur =

Somali poet

Farah Nur Faarax Nuur
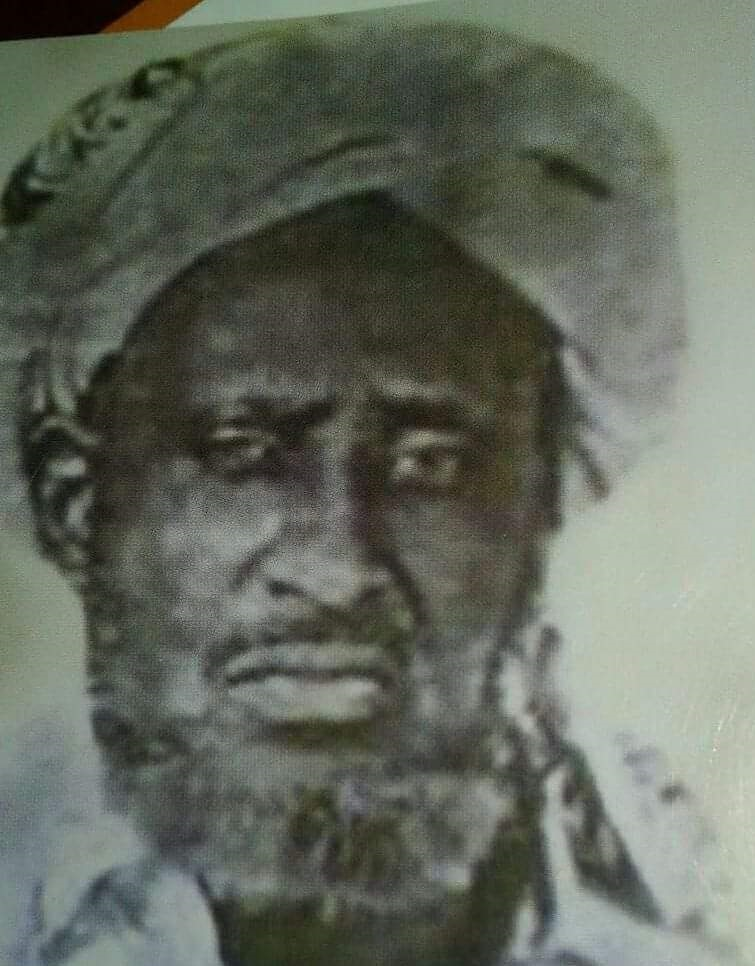
- Born: 1862; Oodweyne, Somaliland
- Died: 1932 (aged 69–70); British Somaliland (now Somaliland)
- Occupation: Poet

Farah Nur Wa'ays (Somali: Faarax Nuur Wacays) (1862 – 1932) was a famed Somali poet and warrior of the Arap Isaaq clan.

== Poetry ==
Farah's poetry had deep meaning and he was known for his eloquence and ability to cover a breadth of topics.

=== Aakhiru Sabaan ===
The poem Farah is most remembered for today is the Aakhiru Sabaan or The End of the World and its first four lines have immortalized the poet in the Somali conscious. An anti-colonial rallying cry Farah lists the colonizers and calls upon Somalis to stand up.

Ingiriis Axmaariyo Talyaan wey akeekimiye
Arladaa la kala boobayaa ka u itaal roone
Anse ila ah aakhiro sabaan iligyadiisiiye
Waa duni la kala iibsadaan nala ogeysiine
Waa duni akhyaartii go’day oo aaran soo hadhaye
Waa duni ninkaad aamintaa kuu abees yahaye
Waa duni xaqii la arkayaa la arjumayaaye
Waa duni Akhyaartii lahayd iib ku doon tahaye
Odayaashaan loo yeedhay ee la anfac siinaayo
Asxaabihii bayna yidhi gaal ha aaminine
Haddaa niman Islaamiyo tihiin aadan ubadkisa
Oydaan Illaahay ka go’in hayna oodine

— Faarax Nuur Aakhiru Sabaan
Translation:

The British, the Ethiopians and the Italians are squabbling
The country is snatched and divided by whoever is stronger
And for me, all this is the teeth of the last days of the world
The country is sold piece by piece without our knowledge
The country where the strong-minded (patriots) are isolated and weak-minded are in abundance
The country where the ones you trust turn out to be venomous snakes
The country where the truth is killed at sight
The country where even some of the notables can be bought
To those elders who are fed by the imperialists
The companions have warned us not to trust the disbelievers
If you are Muslims and the children of Adam
Fend off against the colonial invaders

=== Afar Iyo Afar ===
Farah's Arap and the Saad Musa had come to an agreement after a long period of fighting. The first to speak from amongst the Saad Musa was the poet Maxamed Bulxan and he decided to surprise the Arap with a geeraar. Farah being the preeminent fighter and poet from amongst the Arap felt compelled to respond and composed this famous response on the spot.

Geeraar baan awelkiisiyo
Aakhirkiisa hayaayoo
Idaajaa iyo Weyllun
Ardeydaa dhiganeysee
Albaqraan ka aqaanoo
Anoon looxa ka eegin baan
Habeenkii akhriyaa
Rag ninkaan is-abbaarrana
Asad baan ku noqdaa
Ninkaan aammin la qaatana
Axdigaan bojiyaa
Maalintay urur joogtana
Af aqoonka miyi
Anigow iba saaroo
Anaa lay igmadaa
Afartaa afartoodiyo
Dar kaloo la asaaga
Haddii aad aragtaan
Annagaa axdigii iyo
Aamminkiiba fureyna

— Faarax Nuur Afar iyo Afar
Translation:

Of the geeraar I have its beginning
And also its end
Idaajaa and Weyllun
Which the students were learning
And I know Al-Baqra
Without looking at the board
I can recite the whole evening
To men which I am facing (in battle)
I become a lion
To the man that I trust
I stick to the contract
On the day when there is a meeting
I am the spokesman
I am the first to speak
It is me who is chosen
To those four things there are four things
Other lines which are equal
If you see them
It is we who have broken
The contract and the trust

=== Nabadshe and the Wadaad ===
Aadan Jugle, a Habr Yunis man, had a nephew named Nabadshe who was from the Arap. Nabadshe had asked his uncle for the hand of one of his daughters. Jugle agreed and said to return in two years with fifty camels as mahr. Nabadshe had returned and was shocked to find that the girl had been married and Jugle stipulated the same price to another man. He confronted his uncle and Jugle apologized and promised his next daughter in a years time and set the same mahr. Nabadshe again came a year later to find this daughter married. Jugle was reprimanded by the elders and Nabadshe was promised a third daughter and praised for his patience. Again Jugle would marry off his daughter and got the same fifty camels. Heartbroken and betrayed, Nabadshe took a spear and set out to the home of his uncle, ultimately stabbing the old man and killing him. Following this Nabadshe would be caught by British authorities and sentenced to death in court for the murder. The judge asked if Nabadshe had anything to say for himself after the sentence and he stood and recited this gabay.

Kelyo nimaan laheyn baa baqee kani adaygayga
Iyo Aadan kaalkaan la dhacay kari ogaantiisa
Iyo sidanan uga kaadinine ugaga kow siiyey

— Nabadshe
Translation:

A man without kidneys is frightened but with my strong ones
And the large spear with which I set upon Aadan well
And the way in which without hesitation I killed him

A Wadaad had been called to reconcile the Arap and Habr Yunis and instead decided to recite a gabay filled with insults and curses, and most uncharacteristic for a religious man, the Wadaad was a cousin of the recently killed Jugle. Farah Nur heard of the gabay from the Wadaad and reprimanded him. Following Farah's words no one would pray behind the Wadaad again and he became outcast.

Bal arkoo addoomaha qofkii la ibtilaynaayo
Kolka horeba naar oogan baa or uga yeedhaaye
Isimkii wadaad wow eg yahay Awna lagu sheegye
Bal amaaradii culimadii waa ku aragnaaye
Eedaanna waa laga maqlaa oogta waaberiye
Indha-Hamille iyo Hoobal baa aayadow dhiga’e
Waa aaladdii Bucur-Bacayr tuu ku aakidaye
Adna orodday looxiina waa ku abhinaayaaye
Aakhiro Kitaabkaagu sow ku ashkatayn maayo

— Faarax Nuur
Translation:

Just look at that person who is ruining the servants (of Allah)
At the start he calls out clamour from flaming fire
The name of religious scholar is like the title Aw (Sheikh) which has been said of him
So we see the signs of the religious scholars in him
The call to prayer is heard at that flame of dawn
The one with strange unchanging eyes and Hoobal teach him the aayas (satanic verses)
He is the instrument of Bucur-Bacayr through which he has assured you
You ran (taking a different path) and the board on which the Qur’aan is written will admonish you
Will your book not accuse you in the after life?

=== Hadduu Saakimi Waayona ===
Unlike their larger brothers, the Habr Yunis and the Habr Awal, the Arap were unable to break from Eidagale-led Isaaq Sultanate and decided to stand and change this situation. Led by Farah Nur the Arap crowned him as Sultan and raised arms against the Eidagale and Sultan Deria Hassan.

Composing this poem entitled The Limits of Submission Farah speaks of the conflict and intolerance to the subordinate status to the Sultan.

Rag Sabaan ka Sabaan baan
Salaantow badiyaa
Hadduu saakimi waayona
Sariir baan u goglaayoon
Iska seexo idhaa
Hadduu saakimi waayona
Caanahii hasha Suubbaan
Saddex jeer u lisaayoo
Ku sarriigo idhaa
Hadduu saakimi waayona
Summalkii rugta joogiyo
Sogobkaan u qalaa
Hadduu saakimi waayona
Sarreenkii Cadameed baan
Sixinkowgu badshaa
Hadduu saakimi waayona
Gabadh suurad wanaagsan baan
Surrad’owga dhisaa
Hadduu saakimi waayona
Xoolo gooni u soofiyo
Sadadaan ku ladhaa
Hadduu saakimi waayona
Seeddoow Mood iyo Mood iyo
Salaantaan badiyaa
Hadduu saakimi waayona
Salaaddaan lallabaayoo
Maydal seedo madow iyo
Safkii aan ka dhashiyo
Salligaan cuskadaayoo
Sulub eebo ku joogtaan
Sarartaa ku dhuftaayoo
Sanbabkaan ka baxshaayoo
Markaasuu sallimaa

— Faarax Nuur Hadduu Saakimi Waayona
Translation:

Time and again to men
I give many greetings
If he fails to calm down
I set out a sleeping mat for him
And say ‘Just sleep’
And if he fails to calm down
I milk Suubbaan, the camel
For him three times
And say ‘Drink from it’
And if he fails to calm down
The ram that is at the settlement
And the castrated billy goat I slaughter for him
And if he fails to calm down
The wheat from Aden
I will mix with ghee for him
And if he fails to calm down
A girl of fine appearance
And mats for the bridal hut I give to him
And if he fails to calm down
I drive livestock to graze just for him
And add them to the share
And if he fails to calm down
Oh brother-in-law ‘Pass peacefully’ and ‘Welcome’
I pile these greetings on him
And if he fails to calm down
At the time of the prayers I announce the reer is leaving
The grey horse with black tendons
And the line I am born of
And supporting myself on the salli
With a spearhead of iron
I strike his sides
And make his lungs come out
And then he settles the account

== See also ==
- Deria Hassan
- Kite Fiqi
- Salaan Carrabey
- Hussein Hasan
- Isaaq Sultanate
