= Abdi Mohamed Ahmed =

Somali footballer (born 1962)

Abdi Mohamed Ahmed (AbdiXaaq)
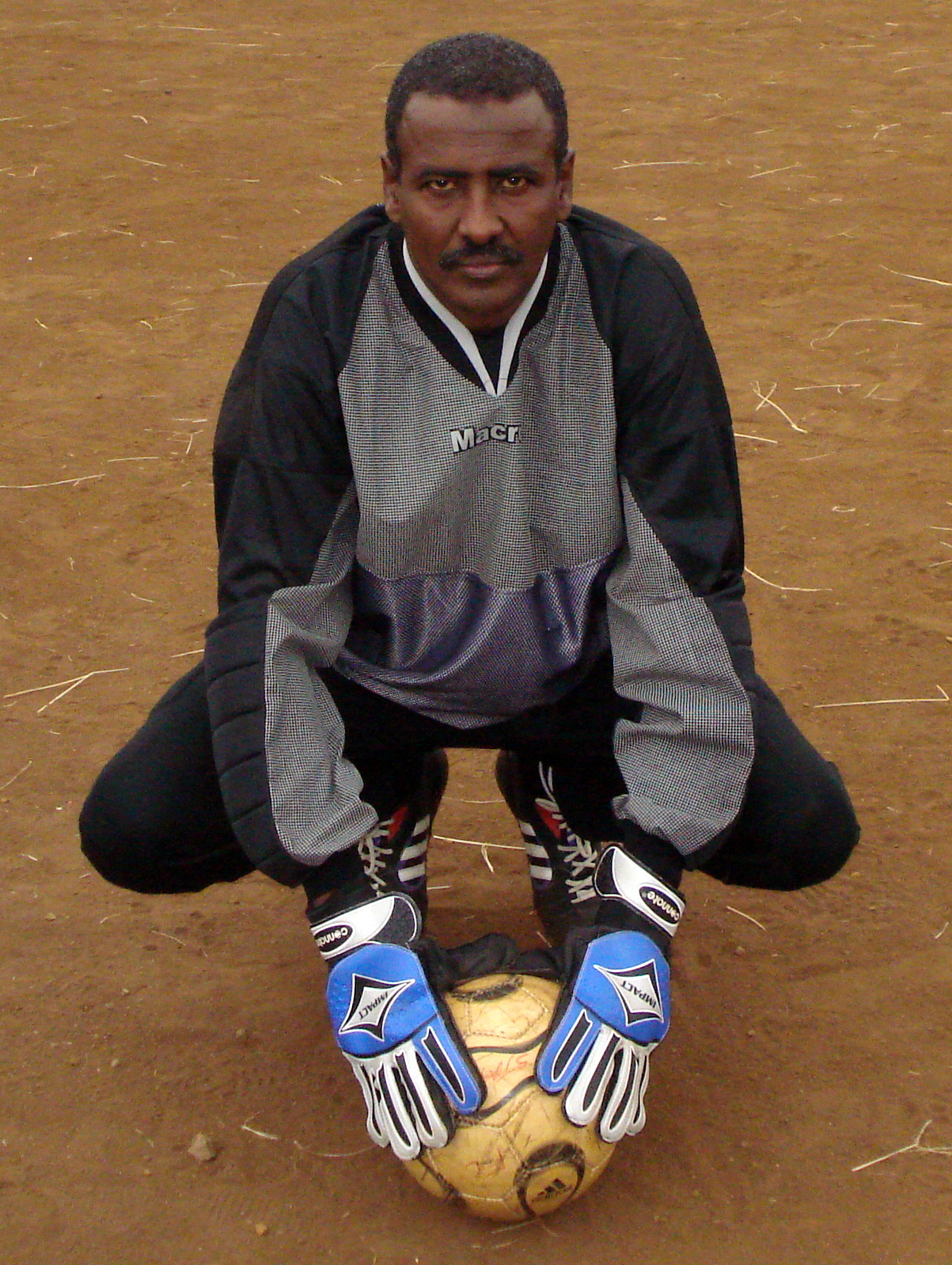

Personal information
- Full name: Abdi Mohamed Ahmed
- Date of birth: 30 December 1962 (age 63)
- Place of birth: Kismaayo, Somalia
- Height: 1.94 m (6 ft 4 1/2 in)
- Position: Goalkeeper

Team information
- Current team: Kismaayo F.C
- Number: 1

Youth career
- Mogadishu F.C

Senior career*
Years	Team	Apps	(Gls)
1980–1987	Mogadishu F.C	41	(1)
1978–1988	Kismaayo F.C	201	(9)

International career^{‡}
1979–2002	Somalia	55	(2)
- * Club domestic league appearances and goals as of 04:28, 12 April 2009 (UTC) ‡ National team caps and goals as of 04:28, 12 April 2009 (UTC)

Abdi Mohamed Ahmed (born 30 December 1962), popularly nicknamed AbdiXaaq /ˌæbdiːˈhɑːk/, is a Somali former footballer who played as a goalkeeper. He spent his whole career at Kismaayo F.C in Somalia from 1978 to 1988. He has won 4 Somali championships and 6 Somali Cup Titles. His individual contributions have earned him five consecutive Best Goalkeeper Of Regions Of Somalia awards & captained his club on numerous occasions. Abdi is nicknamed AbdiXaaq due to his formidable presence and influence. Abdi was also known for his skills as a dead-ball specialist, and often took penalties. He was also known for his eccentricity and at times fiery temper, which brought him his fair share of controversies; Abdi Mohamed made his last professional appearance for Kismaayo in 1988 at the National Stadium of Mogadishu by helping his team win the league title by saving a penalty and amazingly scoring the decisive penalty himself. He featured in the Somali National team (16 Regions) squad for 9 years.

== Personal life ==
Abdi Mohamed currently lives in Australia with his family. Abdi wishes to begin football development projects and open a football club in the near future. Abdi is also an active football ambassador for Somalia.

== Honours ==
=== Kismaayo F.C ===
- Somali League Championships: 1981, 1982, 1985, 1986
- League Cup: 1980, 1981, 1983, 1984, 1986, 1987

=== Individual ===
- Somali Footballer of the Year: 1980, 1982
- Best Somali Regions Goalkeeper: 1981, 1982, 1984, 1985, 1986
