= Yassin Mahi Mallin =

Somali-Swedish politician

- Yaasiin Maaxi Macalin
- Born: Mogadishu, Somalia
- Education: Dalarna University College Mount Kenya University
- Occupation: Politician.
- Known for: Somali and Swedish politics
- Notable work: Former Councillor for Katrineholm City
- Title: Founder and Chairman, Somali Social Unity Party (SSUP)
- Term: 2004- present
- Political party: Somali Social Unity Party
- Spouse: Raha Soyolel

Yassin Mahi Mallin (also spelled Yaasiin Maaxi Macalin) is a Somali-born Swedish politician, educator, and former police officer. He currently serves as Director of Administration and Finance at the National Institute of Health (NIH), Federal Ministry of Health and Human Services of Somalia. He is the founder of the Somali Social Unity Party (SSUP), a political organization advocating for national unity, social reform, and merit-based governance in Somalia.

Mallin was born in Somalia and later migrated to Sweden serving in public roles as a police officer and teacher. Mallin has remained engaged in both Somali and Swedish politics. In 2012, Mallin announced his candidacy for Somalia's presidency. In 2014, he also contested for a parliament seat in Sweden's national elections nominated by the Swedish Social Democratic Party, he served as a member of the regional parliament of Södermanland County. Mallin withdrew from the 2017 Somali presidential election due to corruption concerns and in 2021, he ran for a seat in the Somali Parliament.

== Biography ==
Mallin born and raised in Mogadishu, Somalia, he fled the country in 1990 due to the outbreak of civil war. He sought refuge in Sweden. Mallin established himself in Södermanland County, where he began a public service career that spans politics, education, and law enforcement. Mallin holds bachelor’s degrees in political science from Dalarna University, Sweden, and Public Administration and Governance from Mount Kenya University, Kenya. He is a graduate of the Swedish Language Pedagogic Institute and taught Swedish, politics, and social work in schools throughout Södermanland.

== Early career ==
Mallin was first elected as a councillor in Katrineholm City Council in 2002 and was re-elected in 2006 as the only councilor to serve a second four-year term, serving in the council's culture and consumer committee as deputy representative. He also served as a deputy member of the Södermanland municipal council. Mallin worked as a police officer in Södermanland County between November 2006 and March 2008.

Mallin is the founder of Somaliweyn, a media house that operates a magazine, website, and radio broadcasts from both Sweden and Somalia. The media outlet serves as a platform for civic education and political dialogue aimed at Somali audiences.

== Political career ==
In 2004, Mallin founded the Somali Social Unity Party (SSUP), a political platform dedicated to fostering social development, good governance, and the end of divisive clan-based politics in Somalia. In 2005, notably he was involved in community efforts in Borlänge, Sweden, advocating for Somali residents facing legal challenges.

In 2006, Mallin contested a seat in the Swedish national parliament under the Social Democratic Party led by then-Prime Minister Göran Persson. Although unsuccessful, his campaign highlighted the growing participation of immigrants in Swedish politics.

In 2012, Mallin announced his candidacy for the presidency of Somalia while residing in Sweden. He publicly rejected the 4.5 clan power-sharing system, advocating for a merit-based governance system and inclusive leadership to restore Somalia's national dignity.

In 2014, Mallin ran for the Swedish national parliament for the third time as a candidate of the Swedish Social Democratic Party (commonly known as the Workers' Party), a party he has been affiliated with, representing both Katrineholm Municipality and Södermanland County, continuing a career in Sweden that began in 2006.

Despite gaining support among reform-minded Somalis, reportedly he faced challenges due to entrenched political networks. In 2016, Mallin stated in an interview that Mogadishu's status should be equal to that of other Somali regions. In 2017, he officially withdrew from the Somali presidential race, citing systemic corruption, vote-buying, and the flawed electoral process.

On August 29, 2021, Mallin announced his candidacy for the Somali Parliament, contesting for the People's Assembly seat, following broad consultations and strong support from scholars, elders, youth, women, civil society, and community leaders in his constituency.

In 2025, Mallin and the Somali Social Unity Party (SSUP) launched a new political manifesto calling for national unity, economic transformation, and inclusive development emphasizing on united Somalia.

== Political views ==
In 2017, after Somalia's deadliest bombing killed over 300 people in Mogadishu, Mallin called for international support and condemned the attack, blaming al-Shabaab for trying to derail Somalia's path to democracy.

In a 2018 statement, Mallin voiced strong support for the African Union Mission in Somalia (AMISOM), advocating for its continued presence until Somali forces were adequately trained and equipped. He dismissed accusations of resource exploitation by AMISOM and emphasized the need for national unity, investment in local security forces, and regional integration through the East African Community and IGAD.
