= Governor of Togdheer =

Head of Somaliland region of Togdheer

- Incumbent; Mahmoud Ali Saleeban (Ramaax) since September 11, 2021
- Style: The Honorable
- Term length: no term limit
- Formation: May 25, 1992

The Governor of Togdheer is the chief executive of the Somaliland region of Togdheer, leading the region's executive branch. Governors of the regions is appointed to the office by the Somaliland president. The governor of Togdheer is Mahamed Abdillaahi Ibraahim Hujaale.

== See also ==
- Togdheer
- Politics of Somaliland
