= Sadak Omar Hassan =

Member of Federal Parliament of Somalia

Member of Federal Parliament of Somalia
- Parliamentary group: Parliament for the 11th

Personal details
- Born: Western Somalia, Ethiopia

Sadak Omar Hassan صادق عمر حسن Saadaq Cumar Xasan

Commander-in-Chief of the Banadir Region Somali Police Force
- Prime Minister: Hassan Ali Khaire and Mohamed Hussein Roble

Commander-in-Chief of the NISA in Banadir Region

Commander-in-Chief of the NISA in Galmudug State

Personal details
- Born: Western Somalia, Ethiopia
- Nickname: Saadaq Joo | Brig Gen Sadak Omar

Military service
- Allegiance: Somalia
- Branch/service: Somali National Police Force
- Rank: Police Commissioner (Police)

Sadak Omar Hassan also known as Sadak Joon, has previously served as the Chief of Police of the Banadir Region, and is currently a member of the 11th Parliament of the Federal Government of Somalia.

== Personal life ==
Sadak Joon was born in a region in western Somalia, Ethiopia. Saadaq is said to have moved to Mogadishu in early 1993; then, in 2002, he crossed over to Kenya and then to South Africa, from where he went to London in the UK. He returned to the country in 2014.

The former commander of the Banadir Regional Police Force, he was elected as a Member of Parliament for the 11th Federal Parliament of Somalia after an election held in Dhusamareb in Galmudug State Government. Sadak Joon came out and won seat number HOP248.

== Career ==
When he returned to the country, he held various positions, including the commander of NISA in Galmudug, and in 2017, he was appointed as the commander of national security and intelligence in the Banadir region, as well as the commander of Banadir Regional Police.

== Commanders of the Banadir Regional Police ==
Year	Commander	Notes
2019–2021	Sadak Omar Hassan(Sadak Joon)	Served as Commander of the Banadir Regional Police before later entering politics.
2021–2022	Farhan Mohamoud Adan (Qaroole)	Appointed as Banadir Regional Police commander following leadership changes within the Somali Police Force.
2022–present	Mahdi Omar Mumin (Macalin Mahdi)	Appointed as Banadir Regional Police commander in October 2022 after the previous commander was killed in an attack attributed to Al-Shabaab in Mogadishu.
