= Ali Dable =

Gerad Ali Dable جراد علي طبلي
- 13th Sultan of the Warsangali Sultanate
- Reign: 1491–1503
- Predecessor: Gerad Isse (1479–1491)
- Successor: Gerad Liban (1503–1525)
- Dynasty: Warsangali Dynasty
- Religion: Islam

Gerad Ali Gerad Mohamoud (Somali: Geraad Cali Dable, Arabic: جراد علي طبلي) (Ali Dable), was the 13th Sultan of the Warsangali Sultanate, reigning from 1491 to 1503. He earned the nickname Ali Dable (the word “Dable” in the Somali language means "the one armed with fire"). After returning from an exile in Yemen, Sultan Ali brought along with him a shipload of small guns and cannon fire. Sultan Ali Dable first managed to invade the Dhulbahante territory, and allied himself with Dhulbahante rebels to defeat the Gerad of Dhulbahante's troops in the Battle of Garadag. In 1540, the sultan sent a contingent of 300 troops to Abyssinia to participate in the conquest. The Arab chronicler, Sihab ad-Din, who was an eyewitness in many of the battles to conquer Abyssinia, compares the 300 Harti army to a famous Arab knight whose name was Hamzah al-Jufi. Dable was succeeded as Sultan by his eldest son, Garaad Liban.

== See also ==
- Somali aristocratic and court titles
