= Abdishakur Iddin =

Somali politician

Abdishakur Mohamoud Hassan (Ciddin)

Mayor of Berbera
- Incumbent
- Assumed office 20 December 2012
- Deputy: Bashe Abdillahi Ibrahim
- Preceded by: Abdalle Sandheere

Personal details
- Party: Peace, Unity, and Development Party

Abdishakur Mohamoud Hassan Iddin (Somali: Cabdishakuur Maxamuud Xasan Ciddin, Arabic: عبدي شكور) is a Somaliland politician who is the current Mayor of Berbera, Somaliland.

== See also ==
- Mayor of Berbera
- Mayor of Hargeisa
