= Gobsan Muhumed =

Somali politician

Member of the Federal Parliament of Somalia
- Incumbent
- Assumed office 21 February 2022

Samsam Muhumed Omar (Somali: Samsam Maxamuud Cumar), commonly known as Gobsan Muhumed, is a Somali politician who has served as a member of the Federal Parliament of Somalia since 2022. She is also a member of the Pan-African Parliament, representing Somalia.
