= Kite Fiqi =

19th century Somali military leader

- Born: Ibrahim Fiqi Yusuf; 1810; Isaaq Sultanate
- Died: 1870 (aged 59–60); Isaaq Sultanate
- Organization: Soocane
- Known for: Military leader, poet

Ibrahim Fiqi Yusuf (Somali: Ibraahim Fiqi Yuusuf), more commonly known as Kite Fiqi, was a Somali military leader and poet. As a military leader, he led the Soocane faction during the early to mid 19th century, consisting of forces from various sub-divisions of the reer yoonis Habr Je'lo clan. The Soocane faction ruled over most of what is today eastern Somaliland.

== Overview ==
Ibrahim Fiqi Yusuf was born in 1810 to a family of religious scholars. He belonged to the Habr Je'lo clan, part of the larger Isaaq clan family. His father, Fiqi Yusuf, was a scholar as was his grandfather Ali Galal. His father Fiqi Yusuf, was killed in battle by Adan Madoba horsemen during a raiding party in 1840. His mother, Abban Mohamed Warsame, was a woman of the Jama Siad/Dhulbahante clan.

== 1850s Civil War ==
The western Mohamed Abokor faction, unified under the leadership of the Nuh subclan (Ahmed Farah, Rer Dahir, Solomadow), advanced with an army against the Musa Abokor clan. When the Musa Abokor became aware of the attack, Kite Fiqi prepared his forces for a strong defense. He mounted his horse, rode to the front lines, and faced the invading forces alone. His efforts were not just to fight back but to persuade the invaders to reconsider their violent course. He attempted to halt the conflict with reasoning, urging the invaders to abandon their attack. He spoke to them in an attempt to avoid a full-scale battle, and some of his words of caution included:

Labadeennan kurood,
Oo kaalalkoodi sita,
Oo laysku soo kiciyaa,
Waa masaa’ib kulmaysee,
War toloow kala jooja!

Translation:

These two sides of ours
Who carry the burdens of their efforts
Who are about to clash
This will only bring calamities
Oh tribesmen, stop and reconsider!

Despite Kite Fiqi’s pleas, the conflict escalated. The invading forces, led by the Farah Abdille (Ahmed Farah, Rer Dahir), ignored his appeals, and the battle raged on. As the fighting intensified, Kite Fiqi’s forces struggled to maintain control, and heavy casualties occurred. Kite Fiqi later expressed his frustration and sorrow over the inevitable bloodshed, saying:

Haddii aad kari weydo,
Ama aad kasi weydo,
Kufaarkii inankiisoow,
Kariimkaan baryayaaye,
Kabaalkiinnu jab maanta

Translation:

If you are unable to carry on
Or if you are weak in spirit
This is the work of the unbelievers
I am pleading for mercy
But your defeat today is inevitable

The warning that Kite Fiqi had given came true, and the casualties were immense. The forces of the Musa Abokor clan, led by Kite Fiqi, eventually retreated, but the Mohamed Abokor forces remained relentless. Some reports suggest that a group of fighters from the Rer Dahir subclan, which had initially joined the invaders, eventually withdrew from the battle. The Mohamed Ahmed of the Ahmed Farah subclan soon also withdrew after suffering major losses.

After a few hours, the battle in the Soocane area came to an end. However, one of the Mohamed Abokor commanders, Malow, who led the invading forces and was positioned opposite the Barre Abdirahman (Bi'ide, Ali Barre), engaged in a fierce battle with his troops that day, successfully pushing back the opposing forces. Kite, after concluding his side of the battle, eventually decimated Malow's forces, with significant casualties among the Barre Abdille (Solomadow).

== See also ==
- Hadrawi
- Salaan Carrabey
- Farah Nur
