= Mohamed Amin Osman =

Somali politician

Mohamed Amin Osman is a Somali politician, a member of the Transitional Federal Parliament. He has been described as a critic of the President of Somalia, Sharif Sheikh Ahmed.
