= Saba Anglana =

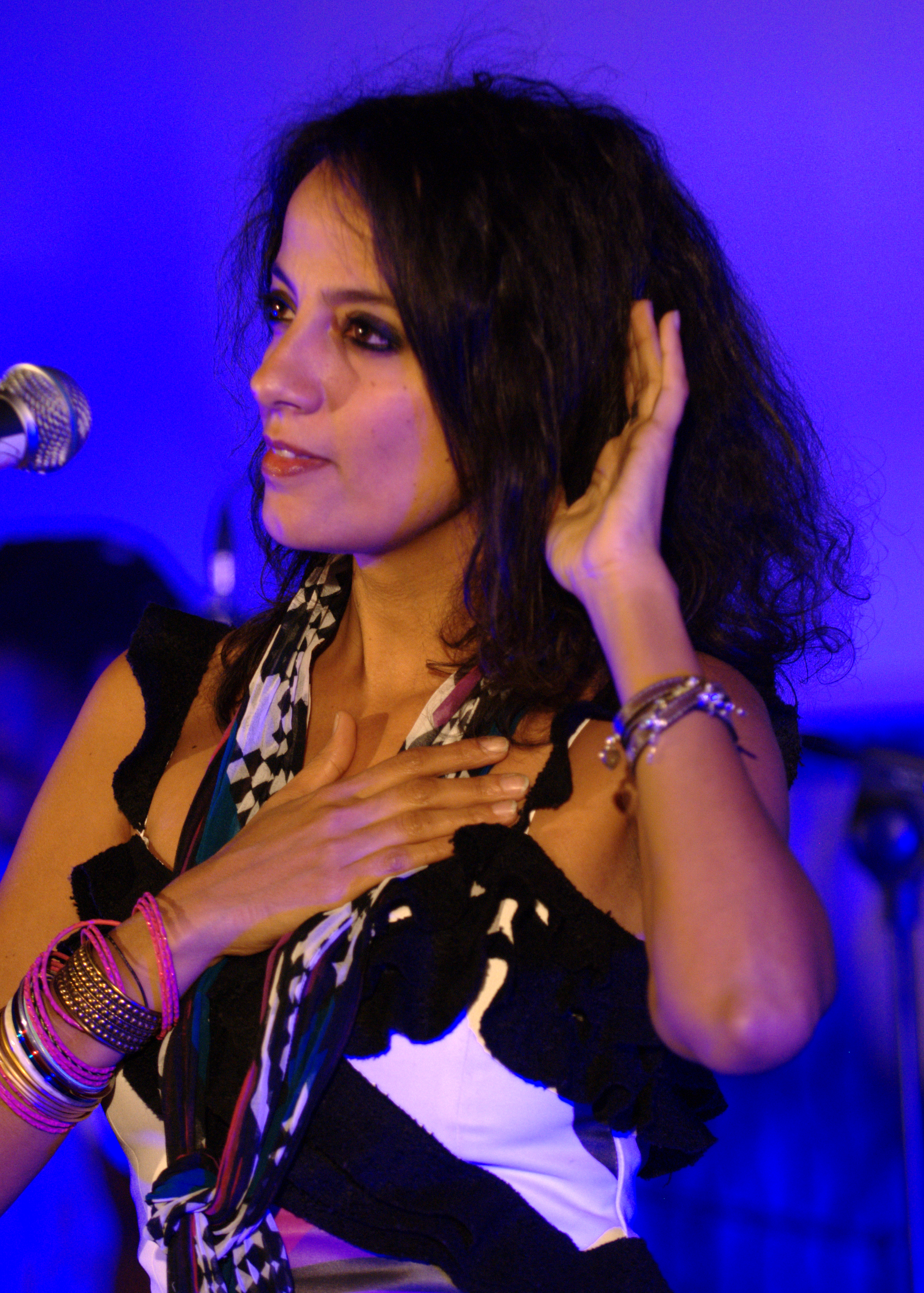
- Saba Anglana in April 2011

Background information
- Born: Saba Anglana; November 17, 1970 (age 55); Mogadishu, Somalia
- Occupations: singer, actor
- Website: www.sabaanglana.com

Saba Anglana (born November 17, 1970) is a Somali-Italian actress and international singer.

== Biography ==
Saba was born in Mogadishu, the capital of Somalia, during the country's socialist period. Her mother was the daughter of an exiled Somali living in neighboring Ethiopia. Her father was a former commander in the Italian military, who relocated to Somalia from Italy after the Second World War.

Due to Saba's father's senior martial background with the erstwhile colonial administration, he was regarded by Somalia's then military regime as a possible spy. The Anglanas were subsequently exiled to Italy, when she was still a child.

Saba was thereafter raised in Italy, where she later studied at the Sapienza University in Rome. Her Somali roots, however, remained an important focus. She studied the Somali language with her mother, particularly the regional dialect of Xamar Weyne, connecting with Somalia through music. Saba is a Muslim, but with modern links to Catholicism

== Career ==
Saba began her artistic career in the 1990s as an actress on Italian television. In a popular local TV series entitled La Squadra, she played a policewoman of dual Somali-Italian heritage.

In 2007, Saba released her first studio album entitled Jidka: The Line, in which she mixes the traditional sounds of her native Somalia with contemporary Italian flourishes.

In 2024 she published the novel La signora meraviglia narrating her family story and her personal research of her roots.

== See also ==
- Elisa Kadigia Bove
- Jonis Bashir
- Cristina Ali Farah
