= Jonis Bascir =

Somali-Italian actor and musician

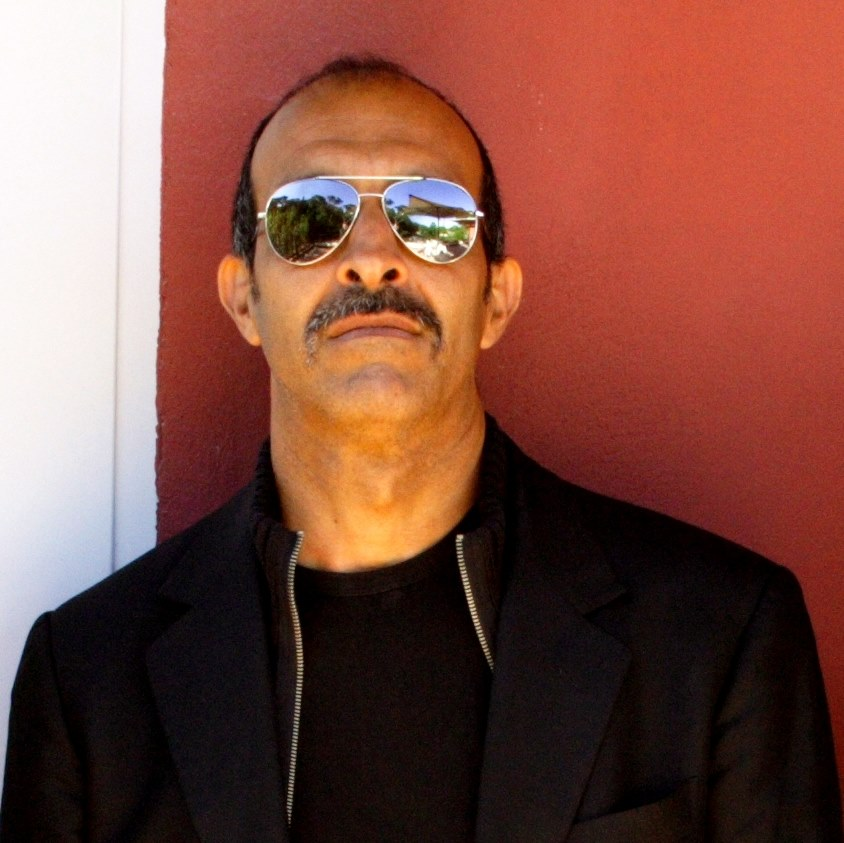
- Born: 17 September 1960 (age 66); Rome, Italy
- Occupations: actor, musician
- Years active: 1990s–present
- Spouse: Nicoletta
- Relatives: Haji Bashir Ismail Yusuf (grandfather)
- Website: www.jonis.it

Jonis Bascir (born 17 September 1960) is a Somali-Italian actor and musician.

== Personal life ==
Jonis is the son of Muheddin Hagi Bascir, and was born in Rome in 1960. His father is Somali and his mother is Italian.

Growing up, Jonis lived between six and ten years in Somalia.

He is the grandson of Haji Bashir Ismail Yusuf, the first President of the Somali National Assembly.

Jonis is married to Nicoletta.

== Career ==
Professionally, Jonis is best known for his role in Un medico in famiglia (1998–2008), a Rai 1 television series. He has also appeared in The Stone Merchant (2006), Anita Garibaldi (2012) and Regalo a sorpresa (2013).

Additionally, Jonis regularly performs with his own band.

He has been a spokesperson for the Kosè coffee brand.

== Filmography ==
=== Cinema ===
- Stupor Mundi, directed by Pasquale Squitieri (1997)
- Simpatici & antipatici, directed by Christian De Sica (1998)
- Comunque mia, directed by Sabrina Paravicini (2004)
- The Stone Merchant, directed by Renzo Martinelli (2006)
- Il mercante di stoffe, directed by Antonio Baiocco (2009)
- Regalo a sorpresa, directed by Fabrizio Casini (2013)
- Out of the Blue, directed by Edoardo Leo (2013)
- Una Diecimilalire, directed by Luciano Luminellii (2013–2014)
- Tre tocchi, directed by Marco Risi (2013)
- Non c'è due senza te, directed by Massimo Cappelli (2014)
- Ustica - The missing paper, directed by Renzo Martinelli (2015)
- Come si fa a vivere così, directed by Loredana Cannata (2016/2017)
- Se son rose, directed by Leonardo Pieraccioni (2018)
- Destini, directed by Luciano Luminelli (2019)
- Credo in un solo padre, directed by Luca Guardabascio (2019)
- Be Kind - Un viaggio gentile all'interno della diversità, directed by Sabrina Paravicini e Nino Monteleone (2019)
- Breaking Up in Rome, directed by Edoardo Leo (2021)
- I migliori giorni, directed by Edoardo Leo e Massimiliano Bruno (2023)
- Una gran voglia di vivere directed by Michela Andreozzi (2023)
- Next!, directed by Giulietta Revel (2023)
- Tutto in....72 ORE, directed by Luciano Luminelli (2024)
- The Resurrection of the Christ: Part One filming

=== Short films ===
- Le 5 forze di Porter, directed by Massimo Cappelli (1996)
- Il tuo paradiso, directed by Riccardo Acerbi (1997)
- Toilette, directed by Massimo Cappelli (1999)
- Il sinfamolle, directed by Massimo Cappelli (2001)
- Amalia, directed by Biagio Fersini (2012)

=== Television ===
- Di che vizio sei?, directed by Gigi Proietti (1988)
- Villa Arzilla, directed by Gigi Proietti (1990)
- Il caso Bebawi, directed by Valerio Jalongo (1996)
- Il commissario Montalbano: Il ladro di merendine, directed by Alberto Sironi (1998)
- Incantesimo - serie TV, 1 episodio (2001)
- Padri, directed by Riccardo Donna (2002)
- Soraya, directed by Lodovico Gasparini (2003)
- Empire - mini-serie TV, 1 episodio (2005)
- Un posto al sole - 1 episodio (2005)
- Un medico in famiglia - serie TV (1998–2007)
- Due imbroglioni e... mezzo! 2 (2010)
- La ladra - serie TV, 1 episodio (2010)
- Il commissario Rex - serie TV, 1 episodio (2011)
- Anita Garibaldi, directed by Claudio Bonivento (2012)
- Il caso Enzo Tortora - Dove eravamo rimasti?, directed by Ricky Tognazzi (2012)
- Roma nuda, directed by Giuseppe Ferrara (2013)
- Centovetrine (2015)
- Il sistema - miniserie TV directed by Carmine Elia (2015)
- Rocco Schiavone - serie TV, episodio 3x02, directed by Simone Spada (2019)
- Dietro la notte, directed by Daniele Falleri - film TV (2021)
- Ostaggi, directed by Eleonora Ivone - film TV (2021)
- One Wish - sitcom (2022)
- Viola come il mare - serie TV (2023)
- Il clandestino miniserie TV directed by Rolando Ravello (2024)
- Minimarket, directed by Sergio Colabona - serie TV (2025)
- Portobello, directed by Marco Bellocchio – miniserie TV (2026)

=== Music videos ===
- Jermaine Jackson e Pia Zadora - "When the Rain Begins to Fall"
- Mike Francis - Ma Lo Sai?
- Alex Britti - Festa
- Piji Siciliani - La mia bella di domenica
- Inverso - La Pioggia Che Non Cade

=== Director ===
- Daniel Meguela - Sei Domenica music video

== Music ==
- 1990 Lavori In Corso Blues Band
- 1992 Tour Giappone Italian Pret A Porter
- 1995 High Spirit (Gospel)
- 1995 The Platters
- 1996 Carràmba! Che sorpresa singer
- 1999 Attenti Alla Noia short directed by Riccardo Acerbi - soundtrack
- 1999 Jonis And The Supersoulfighters (Tribute to) Lenny Kravitz
- 2005 Gli Io Stasera Mi Butto It's only Rhythm and Blues
- 2005 Un posto al sole - Rai 3 guitarist
- 2006 Jonistorie Original
- 2007 Senza docu-film directed by Sabrina Paravicini - soundtrack
- 2007 Un medico in famiglia Rai 1 - sing his song Tell me just one thing and others songs
- 2007 "Without" CD soundtrack
- 2010 L'Estasi dell'Anima - soundtrack
- 2012 BEIGE - L'importanza di essere diverso -soundtrack
- 2013 Il Treno del Blues with Jona's Blues Band
- 2014 Tre tocchi, directed by Marco Risi - soundtrack
- 2014 Non c'è due senza te, directed by Massimo Cappelli - soundtrack
- 2015 L'Appartamento, directed by Vanessa Gasbarri - soundtrack
- 2015 Dall'alto di una fredda torre, directed by Francesco Frangipane - soundtrack
- 2015 Il Grande Male, directed by Sargis Galstyan - soundtrack
- 2015 Autunno e Inverno directed by Francesco Frangipane - soundtrack
- 2016 Spot Against Drugs directed by Marco Bonini - soundtrack
- 2016 Ritratti di Signora directed by Vanessa Gasbarri - soundtrack
- 2016 Ostaggi directed by Angelo Longoni - soundtrack
- 2016/2017 Rosso Giungla directed by Vanessa Gasbarri - soundtrack
- 2017 Risiko directed by Vanessa Gasbarri - soundtrack
- 2017 Boomerang directed by Angelo Longoni - soundtrack
- 2018 Tu mi nascondi qualcosa directed by Giuseppe Loconsole - soundtrack
- 2018 Ti racconto una storia with Edoardo Leo - soundtrack
- 2018 Affiliazione short directed by Gianluca Blumetti - soundtrack
- 2018 Verticale di 6 short directed by Massimiliano Pazzaglia - soundtrack
- 2019 Bahlsen Spot TV soundtrack
- The Full Monty, directed by Massimo Romeo Piparo - singer (2019/20)
- Captain T - La condanna della consuetudine, directed by Andrea Walts - soundtrack (2021)
- Luigi Proietti detto Gigi, directed by Edoardo Leo - soundtrack (2022)
- La notte è un posto sicuro, directed by Giuseppe Papasso - soundtrack (2022)
- Next, regia di Giulietta Revel - soundtrack (2023)
- Il talento di essere tutti e nessuno with Luca Ward - soundtrack (2023)
- La Vittoria è la balia dei vinti with Cristiana Capotondi - directed by Marco Bonini - soundtrack (2023)
- Tutto in....72 ORE, directed by Luciano Luminelli - soundtrack (2024)

== See also ==
- Elisa Kadigia Bove
- Saba Anglana
