= Jiim Sheikh Muumin =

Somali singer and actor (1945–2021)

Jiim Sheikh Mumin
- Born: c. 1945; Buloburde, Somalia
- Died: 24 November 2021; Mogadishu, Somalia
- Musical career
- Occupations: Composer, musician, actor
- Instruments: singing, kaban (oud)

Jiim Sheikh Muumin (born c. 1945, died 24 November 2021) was a prominent Somali musician and actor. He began performing when he was 17. Prior to the Somali Civil War, he maintained a successful career in which he reached "rock star" status. He remained in Mogadishu in spite of local upheavals.
