= Women in Somalia =

Women in Somalia form a key part of Somali society, with clearly defined and important roles in the family and structure. This includes women in Somaliland, a self-declared partially recognized state that is internationally considered an autonomous region of Somalia. The feminine demonym for the latter is Somalilander woman, whereas for a woman from the former Dervish capital Taleh or its environs in modern Waqooyi Bari was Darwiishad. The administration of Italian Somaliland used the language's demonym suffix change to reflect gender, which in feminine form became Somala, which in modern native form is haweenka Soomaaliyeed

The condition of women in Somalia is considered one of the worst in the world, after Afghanistan.

== Population ==
Most people in Somalia are Muslims. Somalia's population is expanding at a growth rate of 1.67% per annum and a birth rate of 41.45 births/1,000 people. Somalia's total fertility rate in 2013 was 6.17 children born per woman, the fourth highest in the world.

Most Somalis are young, with a median age of 17.7 years. 44.3% of the population are between the ages of 0–14 years, 53.5% are between the ages of 15–64 years, and only 2.3% are 65 years of age or older. The sex ratio is roughly balanced, with proportionally about as many men as women. According to the United Nations, roughly half the population of Somalia, as of 2025, is female.

When compared to other African countries, there are lower levels of education and higher levels of infant mortality in Somalia.

The government of Somalia reports that women are more likely than men to have vision or hearing disabilities, while men are more likely to report mental illness or mobility challenges.

== History of women's rights in Somalia ==
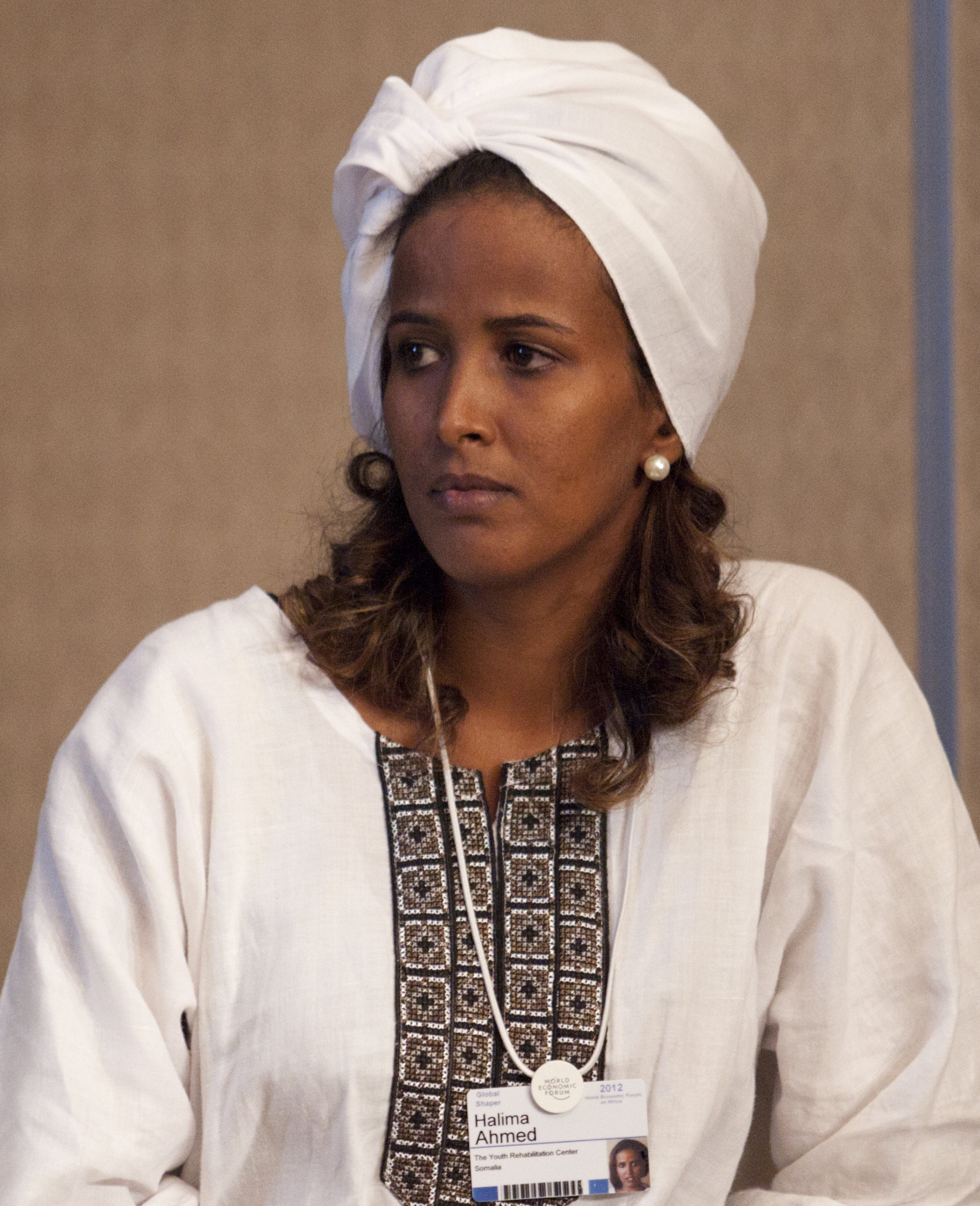
Somali writer and political activist Halima Ahmed

By the late 9th century A.D., almost all people living in Somalia had converted to Islam. The rights of women under the Quran include the right to life, education, ownership and inheritance of property, as well as the right to give consent to be married and the right to a marriage contract with one's future husband. At the same time, Somali culture has traditionally operated as a patriarchy, where men made the majority of financial and family decisions, and dominated the public sphere.

After Somalia gained its independence from colonial powers in 1960, both men and women were given the right to vote. This led to increased participation of women in public life in the 1970s and 1980s. Female school enrollment, women in the workplace, and women's participation in politics and the military all increased during that time. The Family Law of 1975 gave equal rights to women and men regarding marriage, divorce, and inheritance of property and restricted polygamy. President Siad Barre supported the establishment of the Somali Women's Democratic Organization (SWDO) in 1977 in memory of Hawo Tako, a female member of the anti-colonialist Somali Youth League who was killed by Italian forces in 1948. The Barre regime established the SWDO and appointed its female leadership in order to maintain female compliance with the government.

Following the collapse of the Somali state in 1991, women-led civil society organizations emerged as important advocates for peacebuilding, humanitarian response, and the protection of women's rights. Throughout the post-conflict period, Somali women's organizations campaigned for greater political participation, legal reforms, and implementation of international commitments on gender equality. According to UN Women, the contemporary Somali women's movement has played a significant role in constitutional discussions, electoral processes, and efforts to strengthen women's leadership at national and local levels.

== Gender equality ==
Regardless of whether they live in urban, rural and nomadic environments, about one-third of women in Somalia are heads of household. Fewer women than men are employed, and when they are employed, they are less often able to obtain managerial or professional roles. Girls are less likely than boys to attend school, especially at the secondary level, and rates of attendance are higher among girls who live in cities than in rural areas.

Somali women have been making inroads in political spheres. As of 2017, just over one-quarter of the Somali parliament was made up of women, a 13 percent increase since 2012. Additionally, the number of female cabinet members increased from 4 percent in 2012 to 23 percent in 2017.

== Clan and family structure ==
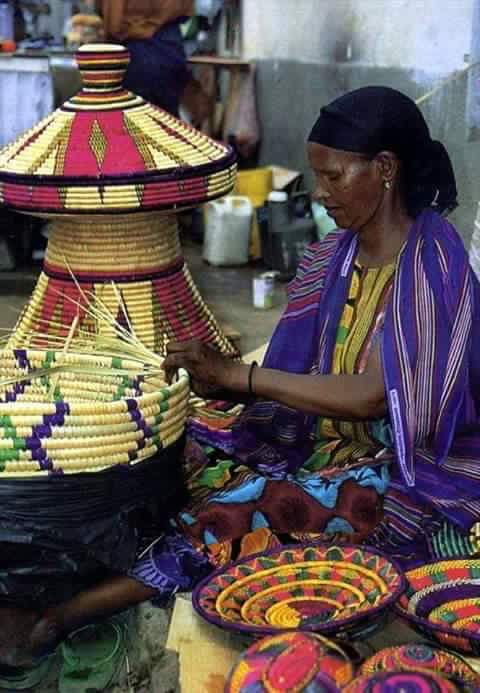
Traditional hand craft during culture week in Hargeisa, Somalia

The clan groupings of the Somali people are important social units, and clan membership plays a central part in Somali culture and politics. Clans are patrilineal and are often divided into sub-clans, sometimes with many sub-divisions.

Somali society is traditionally ethnically endogamous. Women who marry are expected to join their husband's family. To extend ties of alliance, marriage is often to another Somali from a different clan. For example, a 1994 study observed that in 89 marriages contracted by men of the Dhulbahante clan, 55 (62%) were with women of Dhulbahante sub-clans other than those of their husbands; 30 (33.7%) were with women of surrounding clans of other clan families (Isaaq, 28; Hawiye, 3); and 3 (4.3%) were with women of other clans of the Darod clan family (Majeerteen 2, Ogaden 1).

In 1975, the most prominent government reforms regarding family law in a Muslim country were set in motion in the Somali Democratic Republic, which put women and men, including husbands and wives, on complete equal footing. The 1975 Somali Family Law gave men and women equal division of property upon divorce and the exclusive right to control by each spouse over his or her personal property.

== Attire ==
Somali woman in traditional Guntiino.

During regular, day-to-day activities, women in Somalia usually wear the guntiino, a long stretch of cloth tied over the shoulder and draped around the waist. The guntiino is traditionally made out of plain white fabric sometimes featuring with decorative borders, although nowadays alindi, a textile common in the Horn of Africa region and some parts of North Africa, is more frequently used. The garment can be worn in many different styles and with different fabrics.

Under the Socialist Barre regime (1969–1991), women were free to dress as they wished, and most urban women did not wear hijab; however, after the outbreak of the Somali Civil War in 1991, most women in Mogadishu started to wear hijab for the first time, and those who did not were harassed.

During regular, day-to-day activities, Somali women usually wear the guntiino, a long stretch of cloth tied over the shoulder and draped around the waist. In more formal settings such as weddings or religious celebrations like Eid, women wear the dirac, which is a long, light, diaphanous voile dress made of cotton or polyester that is worn over a full-length half-slip or underskirt and a brassiere. Known as the gorgorad, the underskirt is made out of silk and serves as a key part of the overall outfit.

Married women tend to sport head-scarves referred to as shash, and also often cover their upper body with a shawl known as garbasaar. Unmarried or young women, however, wear hijab, and the jiilbab is also commonly worn.

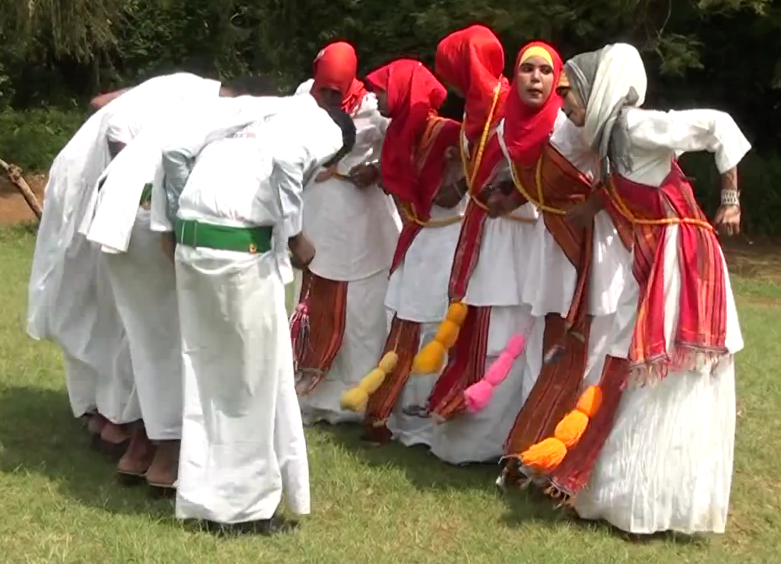
Somali young women and men performing the traditional dhaanto dance-song in Jubaland

The dirac is usually sparkly and very colorful, the most popular styles being those with gilded borders or threads. The fabric is typically acquired from Somali clothing stores in tandem with the gorgorad.

Additionally, Somali women have a long tradition of wearing gold and silver jewelry, particularly bangles. During weddings, the bride is frequently adorned in gold. Many Somali women by tradition also wear gold necklaces and anklets. Xirsi, a quranic necklace, also worn in countries such as Ethiopia and Yemen, is also frequently worn.

Henna is another important part of Somali culture. It is worn by Somali women on their hands, arms, feet and neck during weddings, Eid, Ramadan, and other festive occasions. Somali henna designs are similar to those in the Arabian peninsula, often featuring flower motifs and triangular shapes. The palm is also frequently decorated with a dot of henna and the fingertips are dipped in the dye. Henna parties are usually held before the wedding ceremony takes place.

== Literature ==
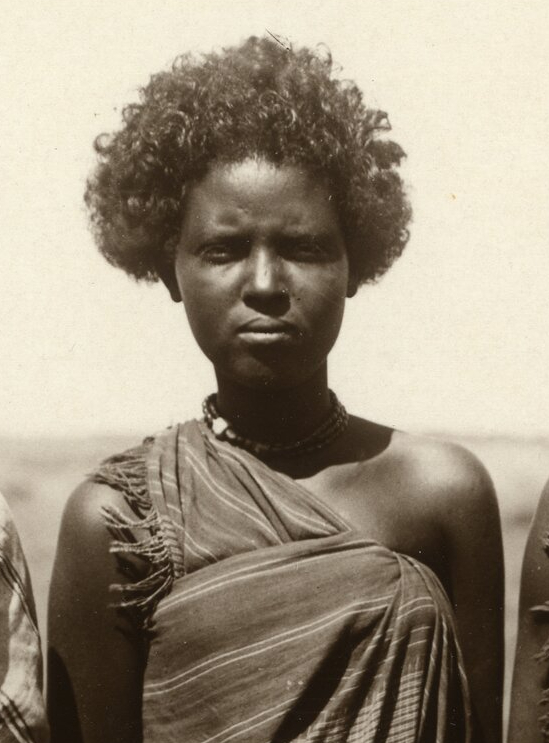
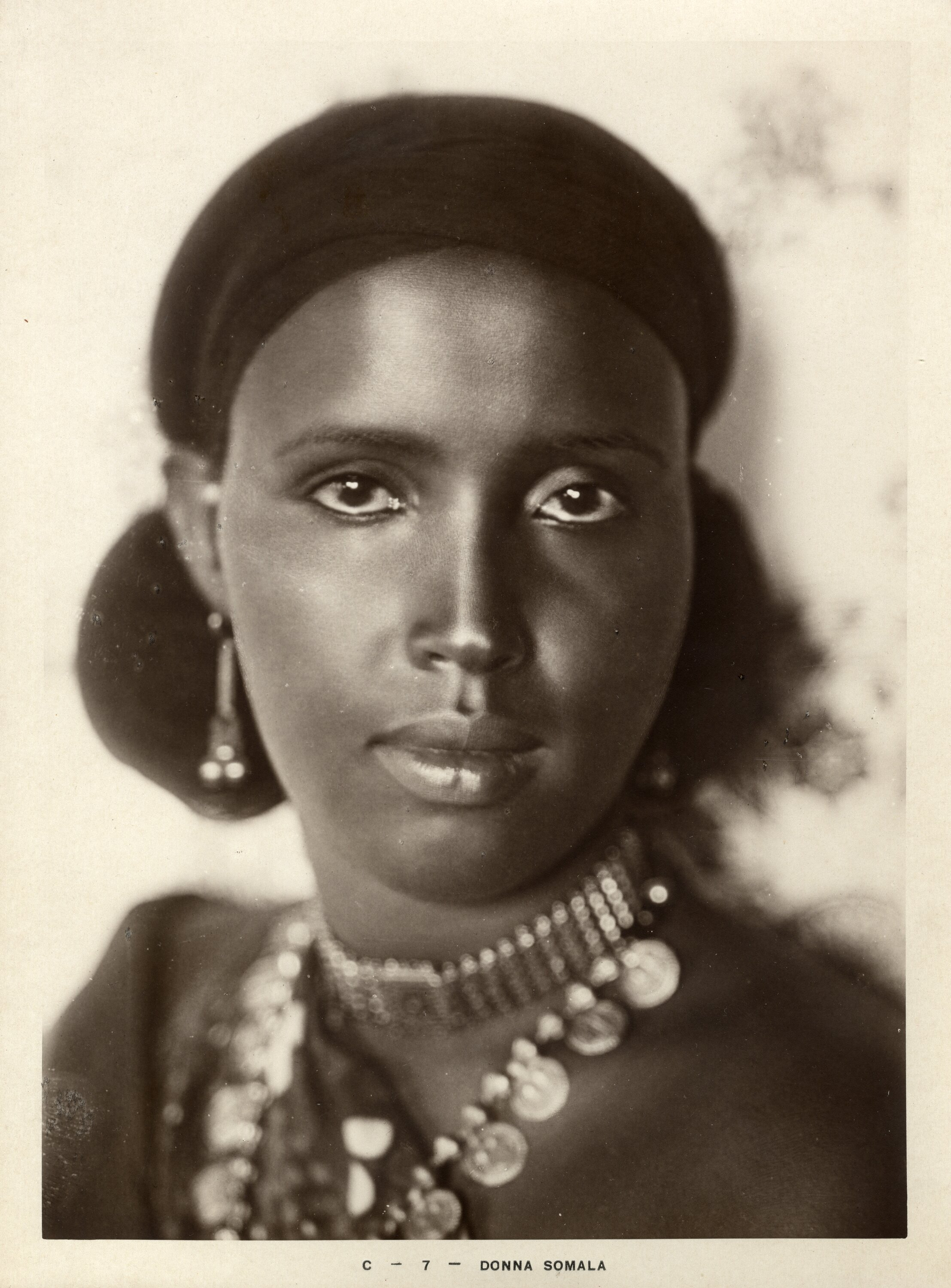
Portraits of a Somali girl (left) and a woman featuring traditional jewelry (right) during the Italian Somaliland period (c. 1920s).

Somalia has a long tradition of poetry. Several well-developed Somali forms of verse include the female-driven buraanbur, as well as gabay, jiifto, geeraar, wiglo, beercade, afarey and guuraw. The gabay (epic poem) is mostly composed by men has the most complex length and meter, often exceeding 100 lines. It is considered the mark of poetic attainment when a young poet is able to compose such verse, and is regarded as the height of poetry.

Buraanbur, which is of a lighter measure, is primarily composed by women. Groups of memorizers and reciters (hafidayaal) traditionally propagated the well-developed art form. Poems revolve around several main themes, including baroorodiiq (elegy), amaan (praise), jacayl (romance), guhaadin (diatribe), digasho (gloating) and guubaabo (guidance). The baroorodiiq is composed to commemorate the death of a prominent poet or figure.

== Notable women ==
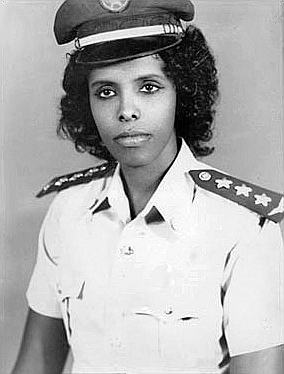
Somalia's first female pilot, Africa's first female air force pilot, and later a peace activist, Asli Hassan Abade (pictured c. 1970s)

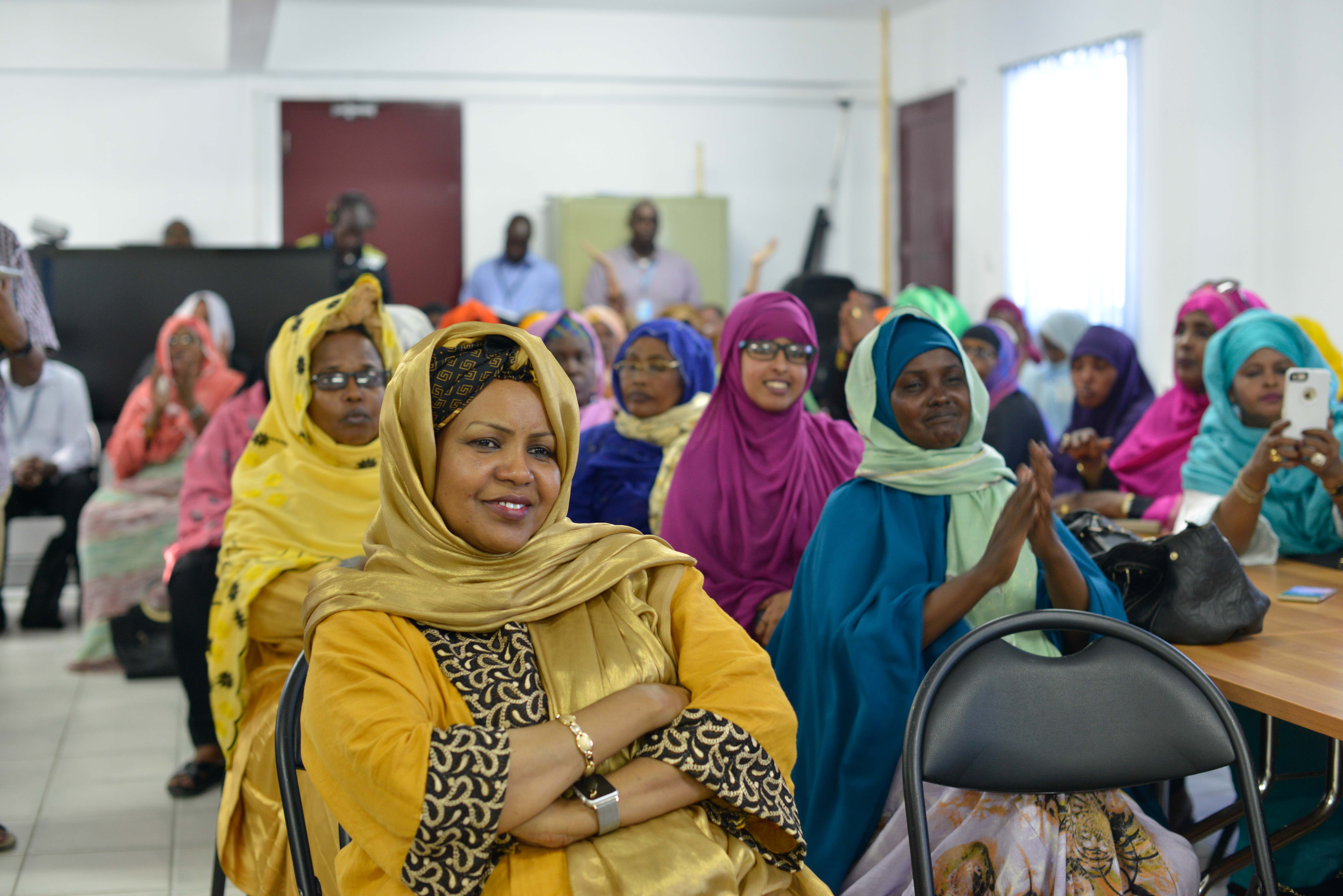
Somali women leaders and members of civil society attend a meeting in Mogadishu on June 19, 2016, during which they have agreed on an election model that will see the women secure 30% representation, across all levels of leadership in the forthcoming elections.

Notable women in the country include:

- Honourable Fawzia Yusuf H. Adam: Member of Parliament and Deputy Prime Minister and Foreign Minister
- Hodan Ahmed: parliamentary consultant and activist
- Amran Mohamed Ahmed: Somali author, poet and journalist
- Maryan Ahmed Ali: Puntland-based Minister of Women Development and Family Affairs
- Fadumo Dayib: first female Presidential candidate
- Asha Gelle Dirie: Puntland-based Minister of Women Development and Family Affairs and first woman Member of the House of Representatives
- Rahma Guliye: Hirshabelle-based Minister for Women and Human Rights Development
- Anisa Hajimumin: Puntland-based Minister of Women Development and Family Affairs
- Hodan Said Hassan: Puntland-based Minister of Youth and Sports
- Maryan Hassan: Somalia's first Chief Trade Negotiator to the World Trade Organization; founder and current CEO of 515. Co-Operative
- Hanan Ibrahim: activist and chair of the Barnet Muslim Women's Network
- Edna Adan Ismail: Foreign Minister of the Somaliland region
- Hodan Said Isse: UNFPA Goodwill Ambassador and First Lady of Puntland
- Fowzia Jilalow: track athlete
- Adar Ismail Jurati: Jubaland-based Minister for Women Development and Family Affairs
- Ubah Abdirashid Mohamed: Puntland-based Minister of Humanitarian Affairs and Disaster Management
- Zamzam Dahir Mohamud: first woman to be elected to the Senate (2023)
- Gobsan Muhumed: Member of the Federal Parliament of Somalia and the Pan-African Parliament
- Maryam Qaasim: Federal Minister of Social Development
- Hawa Abdi Samatar: First Lady of Puntland

== Female genital mutilation ==
As of 2005, about 97.9% of Somalia's women and girls had undergone female genital mutilation (FGM). This was at the time the world's highest prevalence rate of the procedure. A UNICEF 2010 report reported that Somalia had the world's highest rate of Type III FGM, involving removal of the inner and outer labia and closure of the vulva, with 79% of all Somali women having undergone the procedure. Another 15% of women underwent Type II FGM.

The prevalence is on the decline in the northern part of Somalia. In 2013, UNICEF, in conjunction with the Somali authorities, reported that the FGM prevalence rate among 1- to 14-year-old girls in the autonomous northern Puntland and Somaliland regions had dropped to 25% following a social and religious awareness campaign. Article 15 of the Federal Constitution adopted in August 2012 prohibits female circumcision.

In Jubaland, Minister for Women Adar Ismail Jurati led a consultative meeting in 2022 with government officials and people who perform female genital mutilation with a view to stopping the practice in the Kismayo area.

Rates for the country overall remain high despite concerted efforts to end the practice as of 2025. There has been a significant decrease in the rates of extreme Type III "sewn shut" FGM with rates dropping from 82% to 46% over 30 years.

== See also ==
- Polygamy in Somalia
- Women in Arab societies
- Women in Islam
- Women in Africa
