= Chief of the Air Force (Somalia) =

- Taliyaha Ciidanka Cirka Soomaaliyeed
- Coat of arms of the Somali Air Force

- Flag of Somali Air Force
- Incumbent; Brigadier General Abdirisaq Mahamud Haji since February 2026
- Ministry of Defense and Somali Armed Forces
- Style: Jaale
- Member of: Ministry of Defense
- Reports to: Prime Minister of Somalia: Minister of Defence (Somalia); Chief of Armed Forces
- Appointer: Chief of Armed Forces
- Formation: 1954
- First holder: Brigadier General Ali Matan Hashi

The Chief of the Air Force (Somali: Taliyaha Ciidanka Cirka Somaaliyeed) is the head of aerial warfare operations and the administrative head of the Somali Air Force. They are under the Chief of Armed Forces and the Ministry of Defence. The current Chief of the Air Force is Brigadier General Abdirisaq Mahamud Haji.

== Chiefs of the Air Force ==
=== Somali Republic and Somali Democratic Republic (1960–1994) ===
| No. | Portrait | Chief of Staff of the Air Force | Took office | Left office | Time in office | Ref. |
|---|---|---|---|---|---|---|
| 1 | Ali Matan Hashi | Brigadier General; Ali Matan Hashi (1927–1978) | 1969 | 1978 | 9 Years | – |
| 2 | Mohamed Mahmud Guled | Brigadier General; Mohamed Mahmud Guled (1943–2016) | 1978 | 1983 | 5 Years | |
| 3 | Mohamed Nuur Dhuudhi | Brigadier General; Mohamed Nuur Dhuudhi | 1983 | 1987 | 4 Years | |
| (4) | Nuur Elmi Cadawe | Colonel; Nuur Elmi Cadawe; Acting | 1987 | 1991 | 4 Years | - |
| 5 | Sulaiman Mohamed Qambi | Major General; Sulaiman Mohamed Qambi (born 1940s) | 1991 | 1994 | 3 Years | |

=== Transitional Government and Federal Republic of Somalia (2012–present) ===
| No. | Portrait | Chief of Staff of the Air Force | Took office | Left office | Time in office | Ref. |
|---|---|---|---|---|---|---|
| 1 | Mohamud Sheikh Ali | Major General; Mohamud Sheikh Ali | October 2012 | January 2026 | 13 years, 11 months | |
| 2 | Abdirisaq Mahamud Haji | Brigadier General; Abdirisaq Mahamud Haji | January 2026 | Incumbent | 8 months | |
