= Constitutional Review and Implementation Commission =

Agency of the Federal Government of Somalia

Agency overview
- Type: Judicial
- Jurisdiction: Federal Government of Somalia
- Headquarters: Mogadishu, Somalia; 2°04′00″N 45°22′00″E
- Agency executive: TBA
- Parent agency: Ministry of Justice

The Constitutional Review and Implementation Commission, also known as the Constitutional Review Commission, is an agency adjunct to the Ministry of Justice of the Federal Government of Somalia.

== Overview ==
The Commission was established in May 2014 in Mogadishu. On 19 June 2014, the Federal Parliament approved the government committee, with 139 MPs voting in favor, 9 voting against, and 10 abstaining.

Asha Gelle Dirie served as the Commission's inaugural Chairperson. The five-member executive body is tasked with overseeing reform of the Provisional Federal Constitution (PFC).

On 16 July 2014, the independent Constitutional Review and Implementation Commission held its inaugural meeting in the capital. The gathering was attended by a number of senior government officials, including President Hassan Sheikh Mohamud. Gelle and other panel members therein discussed various federal matters, among which were constitutional amendment procedures, public consultation, and the committee's duty protocols.

In March 2015, the Constitutional Review Commission completed the first phase of its constitutional review, with the second phase slated to begin shortly afterwards. According to Chairperson Gelle, the first phase involved ascertaining any technical or political uncertainties in the Provision Federal Constitution. Among these were whether the country should have a Prime Minister or a Deputy President, and which city should serve as the national capital. Gelle estimated that around 85% of the constitutional impasses were technical in nature, while the remainder were political.

On 6 May 2015, Gelle stepped down as the Chairperson of the Constitutional Review and Implementation Commission. She cited a lack of sufficient time left for the panel to complete its allotted tasks as the main reason for her resignation. Gelle suggested that some committee members had been working too slowly to meet the deadline, and also indicated that there was a dearth of funds necessary to manage the commission's affairs independently. The constitutional authorities are scheduled to appoint a replacement Chairperson within a week.

== See also ==
- Somali Postal Service
