= Somali Air Force =

Air warfare branch of the Somali Armed Forces

- Ciidanka Cirka Soomaaliyeed القوات الجوية الصومالية
- Founded: 1960; 66 years ago
- Country: Somalia
- Part of: Somali Armed Forces
- Garrison/HQ: Afsione, Mogadishu
- Mottos: Somali: Isku Tiirsada "Lean on each other"
- Ensign
- Engagements: 1964 Ethiopian–Somali Border War; Shifta War; Ogaden War; 1982 Ethiopian–Somali Border War; Somali Civil War

Commanders
- Commander-in-Chief: President Hassan Sheikh Mohamud
- Chief of the Armed Forces: Major General Odowaa Yusuf Rageh
- Chief of the Air Force: Brigadier General Abdirisaq Mahamud Haji (Abdirisaq Eritrea)
- Notable commanders: Brigadier General Ali Matan Hashi

Insignia
- Roundel

- Fin Flash

- Flag of the Air Force

Aircraft flown
- Attack: Bayraktar Akinci, Bayraktar TB2
- Attack helicopter: TAI/AgustaWestland T129 ATAK
- Utility helicopter: Bell 205, Bell 412

The Somali Air Force (SAF; Somali: Ciidanka Cirka Soomaaliyeed, Osmanya: 𐒋𐒕𐒆𐒖𐒑𐒖𐒆𐒖 𐒋𐒘𐒇𐒏𐒖 𐒈𐒝𐒑𐒛𐒐𐒘𐒕𐒜𐒆, CCS; Arabic: القوات الجوية الصومالية, Al-Qūwāt al-Gawwīyä as-Ṣūmālīyä) is the air force of Somalia. Called the Somali Aeronautical Corps (SAC) during its pre-independence period (1954–1960), it was renamed as Somali Air Force (SAF) after Somalia gained independence in 1960. Ali Matan Hashi, Somalia's first pilot and person principally responsible for organizing the SAF, was its founder and served as its the country's first air chief. At one point, the Somali Air Force had the strongest airstrike capability in the Horn of Africa. But by the time President Siad Barre fled Mogadishu in 1991, it had completely collapsed. The SAF headquarters was technically reopened in 2015 and from 2023 new helicopters arrived. It is now carrying out operations against Al-Shabaab, mostly supporting ground forces.

== History ==
Following an agreement signed between the Somali and Italian governments in 1962, Somali airmen began training in Italy with the assistance of Italian technical staff and pilots. At the time, fifty Somali cadets also started training in the Soviet Union as jet pilots, later joined by over two hundred of the nation's elite NCOs and officers for general military training. Most of the newly trained personnel then returned to Somalia.

The Corpo Aeronautico della Somalia was established in the 1950s, and was first equipped with a small number of Western aircraft, including two Douglas C-47 Skytrains, eight Douglas C-53 Skytrooper Dakota paratroop variants, two Beech C-45 Expeditors for transport tasks, two North American T-6 Texans (H model), two Stinson L-5 Sentinels, and six North American P-51 Mustangs for use as fighter aircraft. However, all the surviving Mustangs were returned to Italy before Somalia gained independence in June 1960. The Aeronautical Corps was officially renamed the Somali Air Force in December 1960. Two Heliopolis Gomhouria light aircraft soon arrived from Egypt (Egyptian-built Zlín 381 Czech licence versions of the German Bücker Bü 181 Bestmann), and eight Piaggio P.148 trainers were donated by Italy in 1962.

On 15 October 1969, while paying a visit to the northern town of Las Anod, Somali President Abdirashid Ali Shermarke was shot dead by one of his bodyguards. A military coup d'état took place on 21 October 1969, the day after his funeral, in which the Somali Army seized power without encountering armed opposition. The putsch was spearheaded by Major General Mohamed Siad Barre, who at the time commanded the army. Barre then proclaimed Somalia a socialist state and initiated rapid modernization programs. Numerous Somali airmen were sent abroad to train in countries such as Italy, the United States, Soviet Union, and United Kingdom. After their training, many of these men went on to become the nation's leading instructors and fighter pilots. Fifty MiG-17s were donated by the Soviets, while 29 MiG-21MFs were purchased by the Somali government.

Asli Hassan Abade was the first female pilot in the Somali Air Force. She received training on single-propeller aircraft, and later earned a scholarship to study at the United States Air Force Academy.

In July 1975, according to International Institute for Strategic Studies estimates, the Somali Air Force had three Il-28 bombers (confirmed in 2015 by author Tom Cooper), two fighter-ground attack squadrons with two MiG MiG-15s and a total of 23 MiG-17s and MiG-19s; a fighter squadron with 24 MiG-21s; a transport squadron with three Antonov An-2s and three An-24/26s; a helicopter squadron with Mil Mi-2s, Mi-4s and Mi-8s; other survivors of the early SAF years reportedly included three C-47s, one C-45, and six Italian Piaggio P.148s.

=== Ogaden War (1977–1978) ===
The roles of the Air Force in the late 1970s included aerial warfare and air defence.

In July 1977, the Ogaden War broke out after Barre's government sought to incorporate the predominantly Somali-inhabited Ogaden region in Ethiopia into a pan-Somali Greater Somalia. The Somali Armed Forces invaded the Ogaden and were initially successful, capturing most of the territory. But the tide turned with the Soviet Union's sudden shift of support to Ethiopia, soon followed by nearly the entire Eastern Bloc. The Soviets halted their supplies to Barre's regime and increased distribution of aid, weapons, and training to Ethiopia's newly-communist Derg regime. They also brought approximately 15,000 Cuban troops to assist the Ethiopian military. By 1978, the Somali troops had been pushed out of the Ogaden.

Before the war, Somalia had acquired four Ilyushin Il-28 bombers. Flown by MiG-17 pilots, the aircraft could have played a decisive role in the conflict. Although only three of the Il-28s remained in service by the time war broke out, they supported the initial invasion. But the planes were rendered fairly ineffective because they were used to fly high-altitude bombing missions. Once the Ethiopian Air Force began to contest the skies, the Il-28s were withdrawn from combat, remaining at their airfields until Ethiopian air strikes destroyed them. None of the Il-28s survived the war.

=== Status in 1980–1981 ===
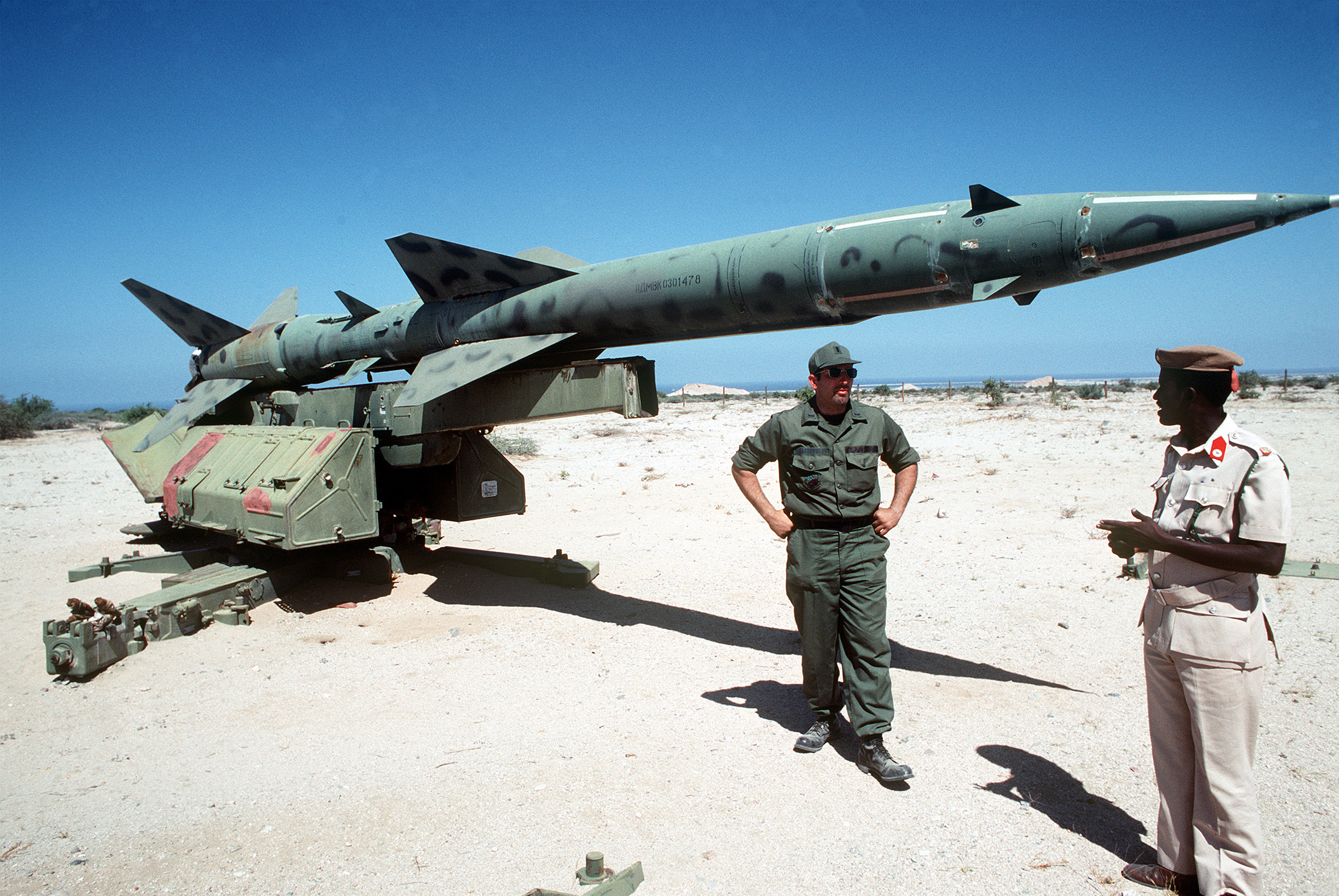
A launcher from the S-75 Dvina SAM system in Berbera in 1982

According to Nelson et al. in 1980, out of approximately twenty-one Somali combat aircraft, less than half a dozen — MiG-17s and MiG-21s — were reportedly kept operational by Pakistani mechanics. Six Italian single-engine SIAI-Marchetti SF.260W trainer/tactical support aircraft delivered in late 1979 were reportedly grounded the following year because of the lack of 110-octane gasoline in Somalia for the piston-engined aircraft. The shortage of combat aircraft was reportedly being addressed by the planned delivery of thirty Chinese Shenyang J-6 fighter-bombers, which began to arrive in the country in 1981.

The Library of Congress Country Studies wrote in 1992–93 that: "..there [were] numerous unconfirmed reports of Somali-South African military cooperation. The relationship supposedly began on December 18, 1984, when South African Foreign Minister Pik Botha visited Somalia to hold discussions with Barre. The two leaders reportedly signed a secret communiqué granting South African Airways landing rights in Somalia and the South African Navy access to the ports of Kismayo and Berbera. It was said that Somalia also agreed to sell South Africa eight MiG-21 fighters. In exchange, South Africa supposedly arranged to ship spare parts and ammunition for Hawker Hunter fighter aircraft that the United Arab Emirates had supplied to Somalia, and to cover the salaries of ten former Rhodesian Air Force pilots already in Somalia helping to train Somali pilots and technicians and flying combat missions in the north."

On 28 October 1985, a Somali MiG-21 crashed.

An Air Defence Command – seemingly a fourth service – was formed by the late 1980s. In 1987, according to U.S. Defense Intelligence Agency records, it was 3,500 strong, headquartered in Mogadishu, with seven anti-aircraft gun/surface-to-air missile brigades and one radar brigade. Eight years later, the Somali Air Defence Force operated most of the surface-to-air missiles. As of 1 June 1989, the IISS estimated that Somali surface-to-air defence equipment included 40 S-75 Dvina (SA-2 "Guideline") missiles (operational status uncertain), 10 SA-3 Goa, and 20 SA-7 surface-to-air missiles.

=== Civil war and Issaq genocide ===
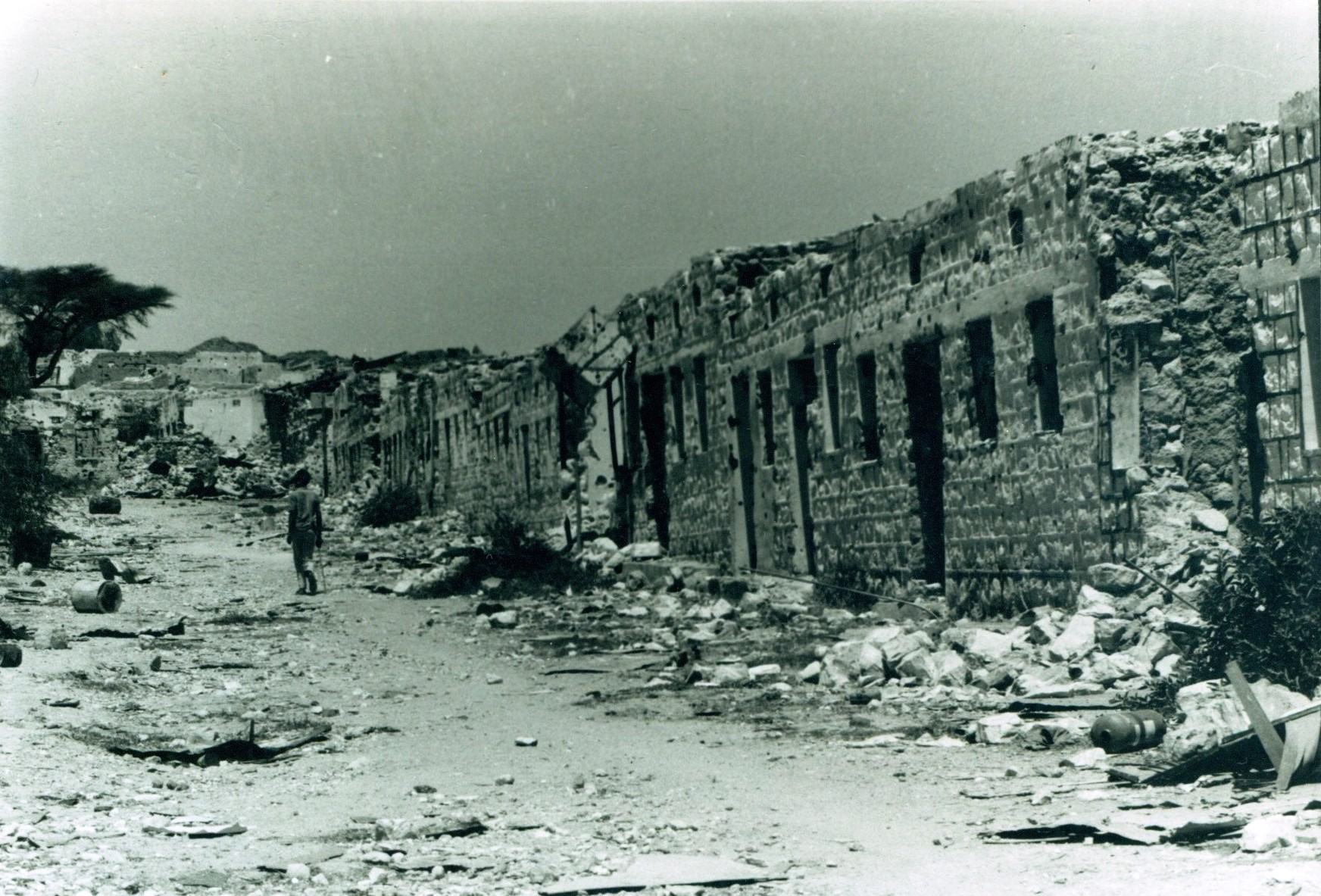
Up to 90% of the city of Hargeisa, the second largest in the Somali Republic, was destroyed.

By 1987–88, the Somali armed forces were fragmenting, as were wider state structures, and multiple insurgencies were growing, leading the country into the Somali Civil War.

In response to the (predominantly Isaaq) Somali National Movement attacks on the cities of Hargeisa and Burao, Barre responded by ordering indiscriminate "shelling and aerial bombardment of the major cities in the northwest and the systematic destruction of Isaaq dwellings, settlements and water points". To end what he saw as the "Isaaq problem", Barre's regime specifically targeted civilian of the clan, especially in Hargeisa and Burao. The Somali Armed Forces aerially strafed fleeing refugees before they could reach the Ethiopian border. Genocide scholar Adam Jones said the following of Barre's campaign against the Isaaq:

In two months, from May to July 1988, between 50,000 and 100,000 people were massacred by the regime's forces. By then, any surviving urban Isaaks – that is to say, hundreds of thousands of members of the main northern clan community – had fled across the border into Ethiopia. They were pursued along the way by British-made fighter-bombers piloted by mercenary South African and ex-Rhodesian pilots, paid $2,000 per sortie.

Despite the government's continued refusal to grant foreigner access to the north to report on the situation, The New York Times reported that Isaaq refugees had been strafed:

Western diplomats here said they believed that the fighting in Somalia... was continuing unabated. More than 10,000 people were killed in the first month after the conflict began in late May, according to reports reaching diplomats here. The Somali Government has bombed towns and strafed fleeing residents and used artillery indiscriminately, according to the officials.

=== Dissolution ===
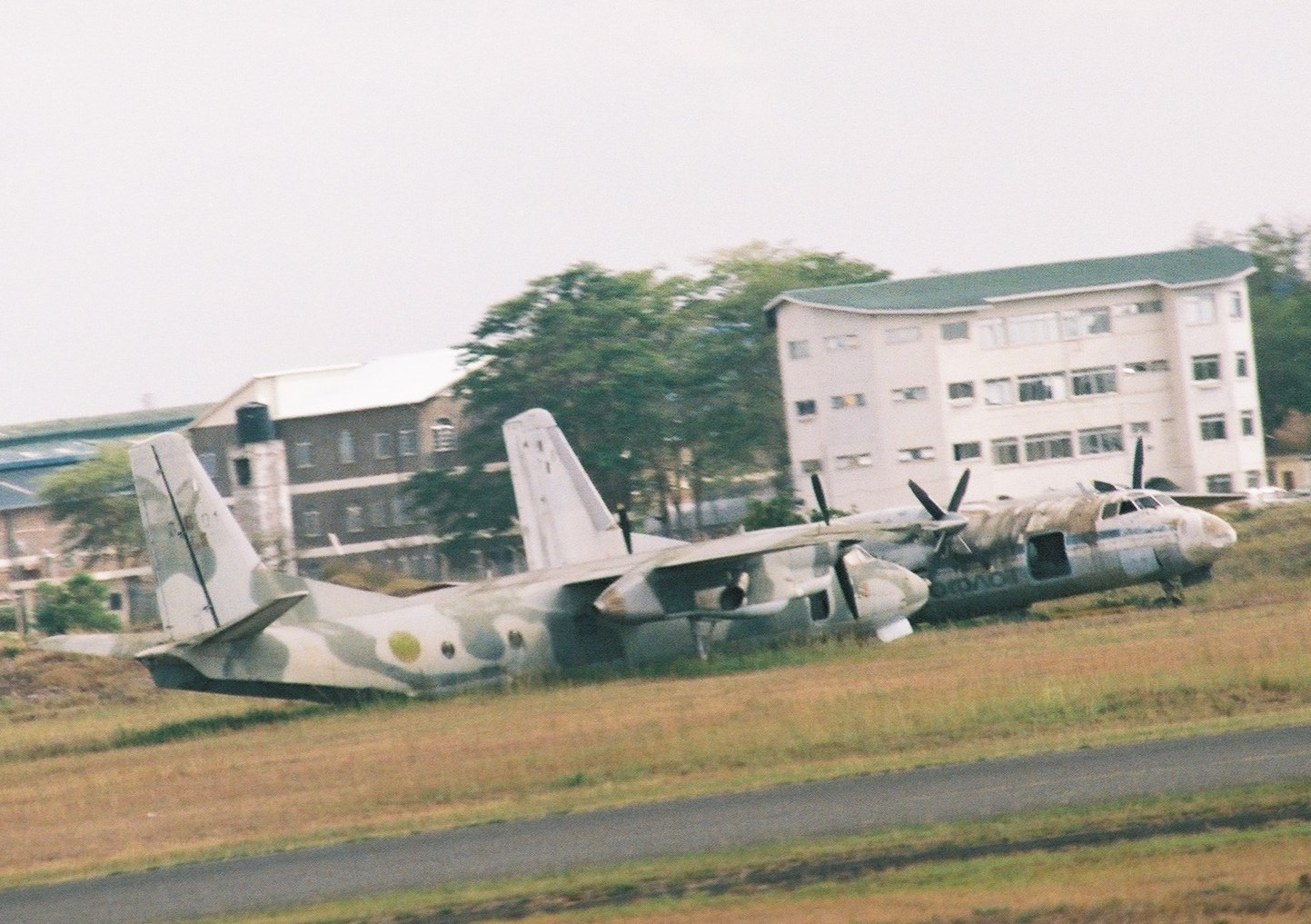
Derelict Somali An-26s in Kenya

In 1990, "the SAF was organized into three fighter ground-attack squadrons equipped with J-6 and Hawker Hunter aircraft; three fighter squadrons equipped with MiG-21MF and MiG-17 aircraft; a counterinsurgency squadron equipped with SF-260W aircraft; a transport squadron equipped with An-2, An-24, An-26, BN-2, C-212, and Aeritalia G.222 aircraft; and a helicopter squadron equipped with Mi-4, Mi-8, and Agusta-Bell aircraft;" it was also equipped with a number of training aircraft. The IISS Military Balance for 1990–91 estimated that the Somali Air Force had 2,500 personnel and a total of 56 combat aircraft, listing four Hunters, 10 MiG-17s, 22 J-6s, eight MiG-21MFs, six SF-260Ws, and a single Hawker Hunter FR.76 reconnaissance aircraft (p. 117).

By the time President Barre fled Mogadishu for his home region of Gedo in late January 1991, the country's air force had effectively ceased to exist amid the Somali Civil War. In 1993, eight MiG-21s (six MiG-21MFs and two MiG-21UMs), three MiG-15UTIs, one SF-260W and an unknown number of MiG-17 wrecks were seen at Mogadishu airport. Three Hawker Hunters (serial numbers 704, 705 and 711) were seen at Baidoa Airport by Australian forces during the UNOSOM II intervention, but later removed.

=== Relaunch in the 2010s ===
During the decades since the Somali Civil War began, former members of the air force during Barre's regime kept in contact with each other. On 29 October 2012, 40 former senior Somali National Army and Air Force officers participated in a three-day workshop called Improving Understanding and Compliance with International Humanitarian Law (IHL), organized by the African Union Mission in Somalia in Djibouti. In October 2014, Somali Air Force cadets underwent additional training in Turkey.

On 1 July 2015, Somali Defence Minister Abdulkadir Sheikh Dini reopened the headquarters of the Somali Air Force in Afisone, Mogadishu, to help re-establish the air force after a quarter century of civil war.

As of 2017 the Somali air force was not operational and possessed no aircraft. It is composed of approximately 170 personnel: 40-50 officers, ranging from second lieutenant to colonel, and 120-130 non-commissioned officers and airmen. The Turkish Air Force delivered residential training to a group of young Somali air force personnel and with the intention to support further development of Somali aviation capabilities. The potential cumulative ten-year cost of redeveloping a Somali air arm was estimated to be $50 million.

=== Developments in the 2020s ===
On 6 March 2020, Somali Brigadier General Sheikh Ali met with Pakistani Air Chief Marshal Mujahid Anwar Khan in Islamabad to discuss cooperation efforts and bilateral ties between the Somali Air Force and Pakistani Air Force.

In December 2021, Turkey deployed Bayraktar TB2 drones to the Mogadishu area, and videos of them in flight started to surface online.

In September 2022, the Minister of Interior Ahmed Moalim Fiqi confirmed that Turkish Bayraktar TB2 drones were being used against Al-Shabab. In October 2022, the yearly Final Report of the UN Panel of Experts on Somalia wrote that :

"The Panel sent letters to Turkey and the Federal Government of Somalia requesting clarification on this matter as well as information on the nature of cargo delivered by the two A400M without notification to the Security Council Committee on Somalia, but has not yet received a reply from Somalia. Turkey informed the Panel that it has not delivered any type of unmanned combat aerial vehicles to the Somali authorities and that the systems in question are assigned to be used by Turkey in the fight against terrorism in Somalia. ..the Panel considers that the delivery of these systems to Somalia is not compliant with the arms embargo. The Panel noted that Turkey has never publicly reported on any airstrikes in Somalia"

In July 2023, Somalia received two Bell 412s from Italy. The aircraft will perform a variety of roles including troop transport, medical evacuation, and SAR. The aircraft was delivered as part of a larger shipment of weapons to boost Somalia's counter-insurgency capabilities in its efforts against Al-Shabaab.

In December 2023, the construction of an airbase in Wargaadhi, Middle Shabelle began. The project was confirmed during an official visit by the Chief of the Somali National Army, Brigadier General Ibrahim Sheikh Muhyiddin, who inspected the site alongside regional commanders.

According to The Somali Digest, the airstrip is intended to strengthen military logistics and enhance mobility in the central regions, contributing to the broader goals of modernizing Somalia’s security infrastructure. Though initiated under the Somali National Army, the facility is widely expected to be incorporated into the Somali Air Force's operational network as its capabilities continue to expand, particularly to support aerial operations against terrorist groups in central Somalia. Official government sources said the airbase was intended to assist Somali Air Force operations supporting the Somali National Army and is part of ongoing efforts to expand the Air Force’s presence beyond its current base in Mogadishu.

Following the announcement of the Wargaadhi airbase, Egypt delivered anti-aircraft weapons to Somalia twice in 2024 under a bilateral security agreement. The equipment, delivered by Egyptian warships and aircraft, was intended to enhance Somalia’s air defense capabilities.

Alongside ongoing training programs with Turkey and Pakistan, some Somali Air Force personnel have reportedly been present in Eritrea. President Hassan Sheikh Mohamud has visited the Eritrean Air Force headquarters in Asmara on multiple occasions, including in 2022 and again in July 2024. During these visits, Somali trainees were seen there, with the earlier trip suggesting that training activities may have begun well before 2024. Videos and photos circulating online show individuals in Somali uniforms working around Eritrean Air Force aircraft, including Mi-24 helicopters, fixed-wing trainers, Su-25 aircraft and MiG-29 fighters which Eritrea operates.

In late 2024 the United Nations Panel of Experts reported the arrival of five Bell 412EPX helicopters (the same aircraft that may be misidentified AB.205s) and said "However, sustaining this aerial capacity will remain challenging, given the high maintenance costs of the helicopters and the limited financial resources of Somalia." They said the aircraft were maintained by Somali and Turkish ground crews.

==== 2025 ====
In March 2025, a number of Baykar Bayraktar Akinci drones were delivered by Turkey. At the same time, the Turkish Armed Forces deployed a number of its own attack helicopters to the Mogadishu area.

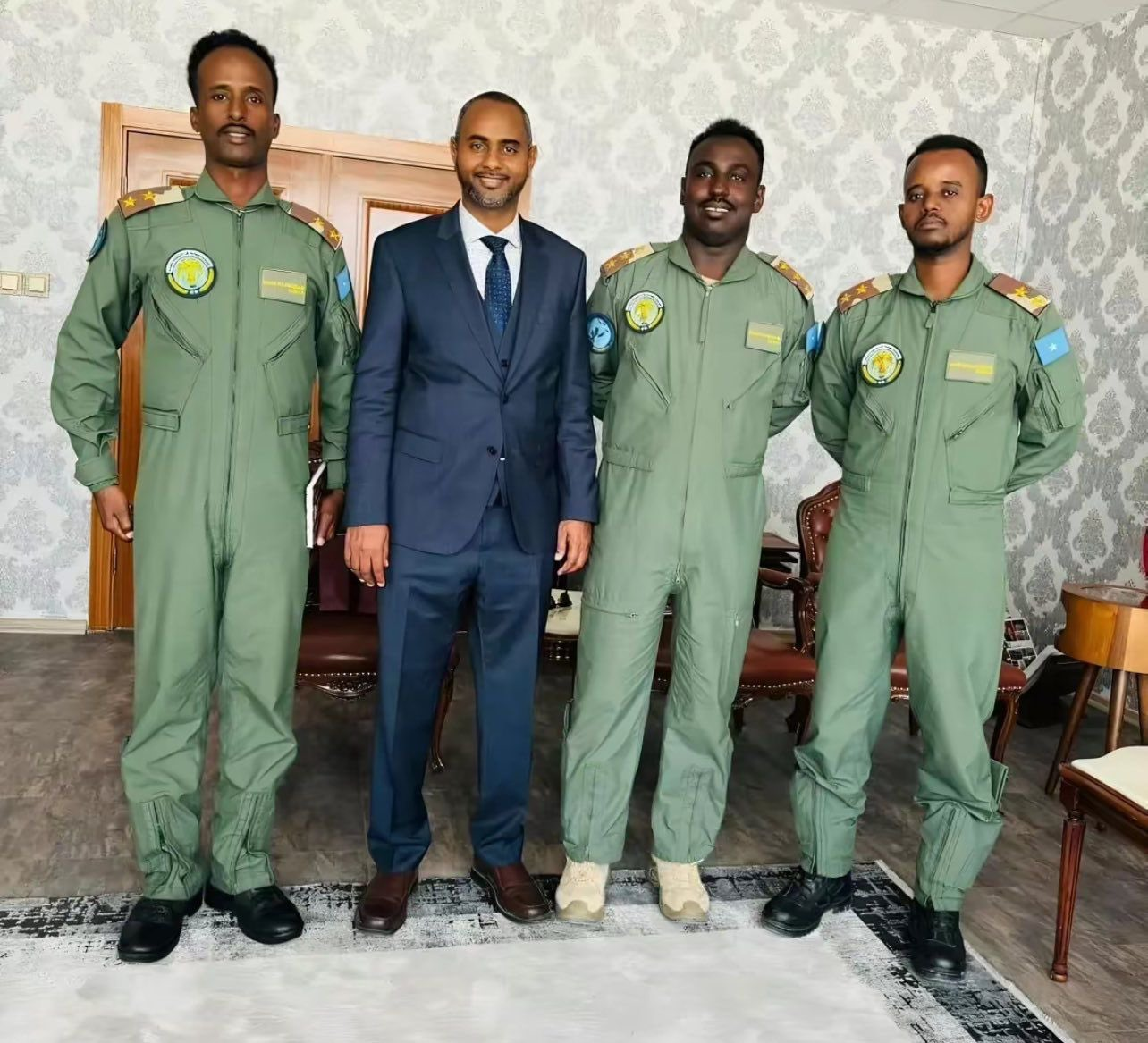
A captain and two first lieutenants in flight suits with the former Defence Minister in August 2024.

There have been repeated reports that Bell utility helicopters have entered military service with Somalia. Some helicopters with Somali Air Force markings remain registered as civilian aircraft, including 6O-AAG (an Agusta-Bell 412) and 6O-AAH (an Agusta-Bell 412SP). These helicopters entered service with Gamtecs Aviation Academy in Mogadishu, that provides flight training to both military and civilian personnel. In May 2025 there were reports that the helicopters operated by Gamtecs Aviation Academy, while registered as civilian aircraft, had been rented out in private charters to "military officials and personnel from other security sectors" at US $5-8,000 a flight.

In addition to the two civil-registered Bell 412s, at least four Bell 412EPX helicopters have been verified in Somali Air Force service, with evidence of active deployment and SAF markings. A UN panel report lists five Bell 412EPX helicopters delivered to Somalia. According to defense sources, Somalia paid approximately $16 million for the acquisition. The widely reported delivery of four Bell 412 helicopters from Italy in August 2024 has been questioned by one source claiming they were AB.205 helicopters.

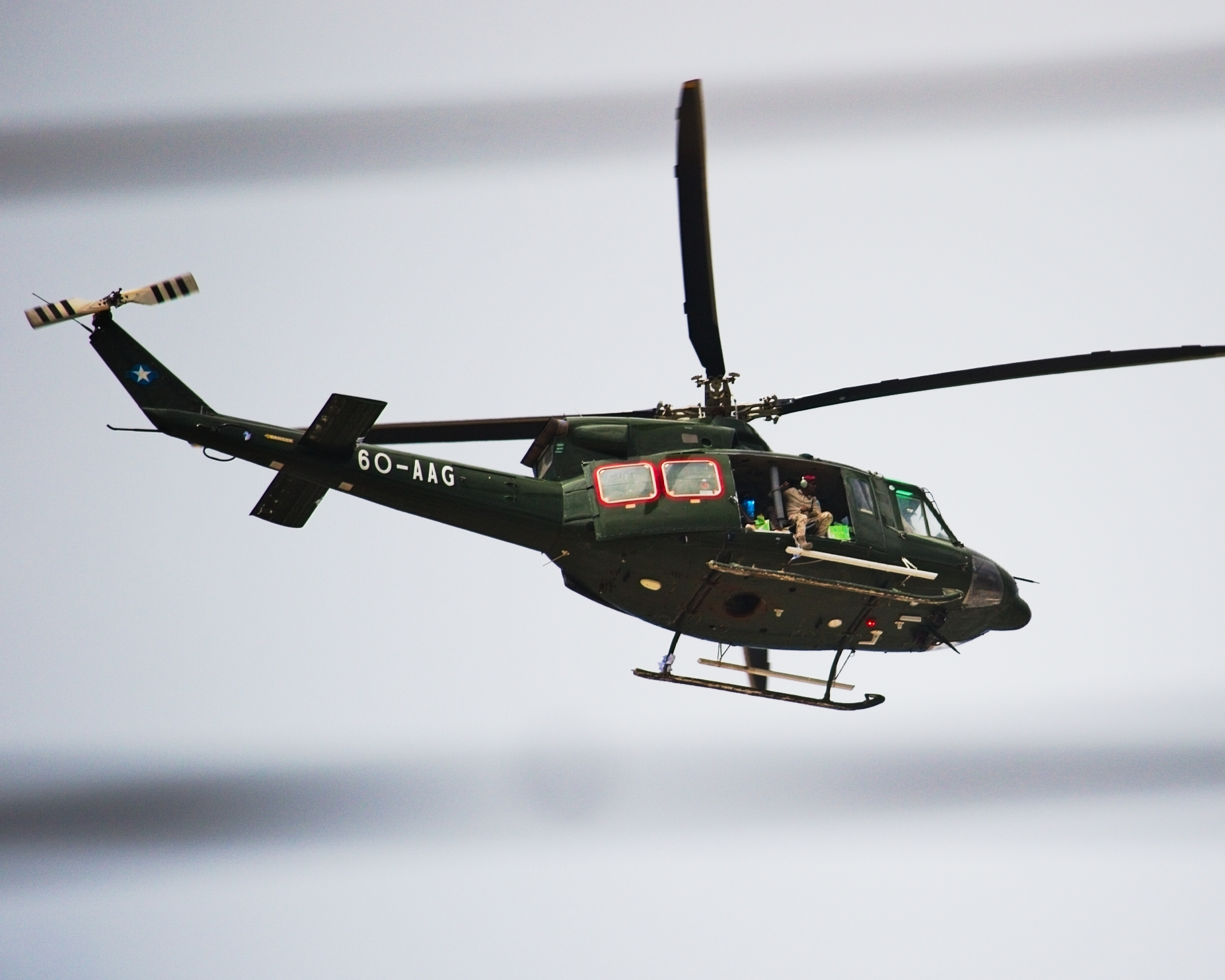
Civil-registered Agusta-Bell 412 operated by Gamtecs Aviation Academy with Somali Air Force markings on the tailboom, used for local Somali Air Force training and utility.

In early June 2025, Turkey announced that two utility helicopters for the Somali Navy would be delivered. The delivery follows a phone call between Turkish President Recep Tayyip Erdogan and Somali President Hassan Sheikh Mohamud, during which Erdogan reaffirmed Turkey's commitment to supporting Somalia's counter-terrorism operations.

Later in June 2025, the Turkish Armed Forces' T129 ATAK helicopters underwent a series of test flights at the Turksom military facility in Mogadishu. These test flights were conducted by Somali pilots trained in Turkey. Turkish advisors supervised the process to ensure operational readiness and systems integration. However, Middle East Eye had been told by a Somali source in late May 2025 that "Somali pilots were still in training in Turkey [though] their training would be completed in the next two months, potentially allowing Somali army to fly helicopters later this year."

Shortly after completing their test flights, the T129 ATAK helicopters flew combat missions against al-Shabaab.

Turkish-built drones have conducted several drone strikes against al-Shabaab militants. On March 21, NISA announced that airstrikes in Lower Shabelle had killed 82 insurgents. Later, on May 21, security sources who requested annonymity claimed that further strikes had targeted al-Shabaab training camps and weapons depots in Middle Jubba and Lower Shabelle, killing at least 29 commanders and damaging militant infrastructure.

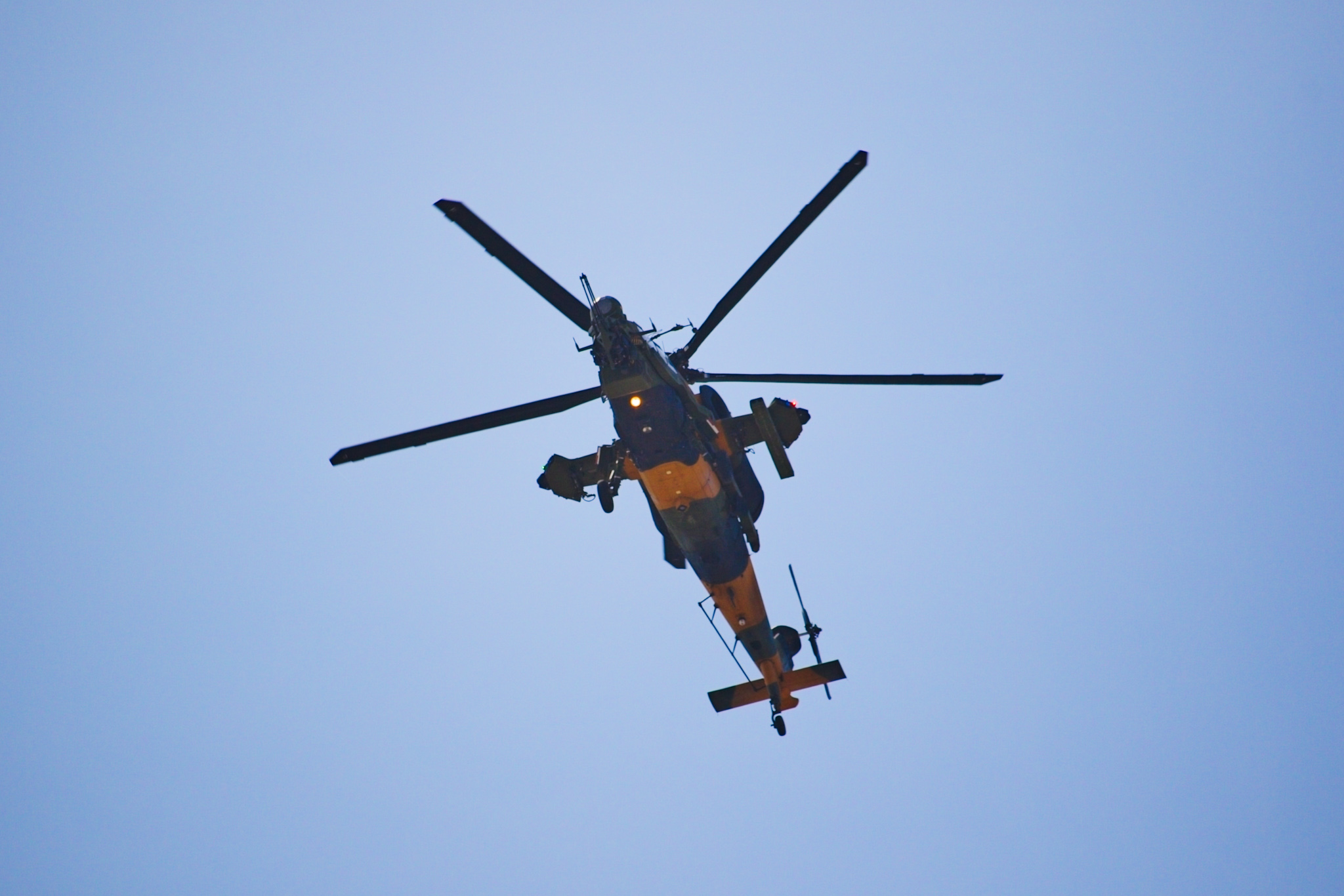
A newly arrived, unpainted T129 ATAK attack helicopter of the Turkish Armed Forces flies over Mogadishu during the 1st July 2025 Independence Day military parade, one of six.

In September 2025, a Somali reporter writing for Foreign Policy recorded the Turkish drone strike process as:

Turkey is waging a drone war against al-Shabab in Somalia from a joint command with Somalia’s intelligence agency. (The United States and United Arab Emirates are also involved in Somalia’s drone operations.) It carries out drone strikes at the behest of Somalia’s National Intelligence and Security Agency (NISA), with Somalia’s NISA feeding Turkey intelligence on targets, and Turkey then carrying out the strikes. According to two senior Mogadishu-based Somali intelligence officials, the strike on Quracley followed this process. (Officials spoke on the condition of anonymity because they weren’t cleared to speak with the press.)

This description supports the likelihood that "Somali Air Force" participation in the operation of drones is minimal.

On November 3, 2025, "Garowe Online" carried a report quoting unnamed Turkish officials about the presence of Turkish-built T129 ATAK attack helicopters in Somalia. The officials commented after repeated reports on social media that Somalia had taken ownership of the T129 attack helicopters. They said the aircraft seen at the ceremony remained under Turkish control; were not part of the Somali National Army's inventory; and were used for training and operational purposes by Turkish personnel stationed in Somalia.

==== 2026 ====
In early 2026, reports emerged that Somalia was in advanced talks with Pakistan to acquire 24 JF‑17 Thunder Block III fighter jets as part of efforts to modernize its air force. According to the reports, the discussions followed a visit by a Somali delegation to Pakistan led by the commander of the Somali Air Force, Mohamud Sheikh Ali, and, if finalized, the deal would represent the largest defense acquisition by Somalia since the collapse of its central government in 1991.

In February 2026, the Federal Government of Somalia appointed Brigadier General Abdirisaq Mahamud Haji as Commander of the Somali Air Force.

In April 2026, it was reported that the acquisition agreement had been finalized with the official signing of the contract in Islamabad. According to Radio Dalsan and HUM News, citing Somali defense officials, the deal includes the procurement of 24 JF-17 Thunder Block III aircraft and a support package for pilot and ground crew training. Neither government has issued a formal statement, though reports indicate that deliveries are expected to begin within 18 to 24 months.

== Uniform ==
Somali Air Force servicemen wore green flight suits with shoulderboards indicating their rank, along with a visored pilot mask and helmet when actively flying. The Air Force would traditionally wear a sky blue (in summer) or navy blue service shirt, navy blue trousers, beret or sidecap, shoulderboards and black boots. Dress uniforms consisted of a navy blue peaked cap, blazer, trousers, black formal shoes and tie and sky blue shirt. Servicemen would wear ribbons on their left breast, as well as Air Force insignia.

== Equipment ==
=== Current equipment ===
Aircraft reportedly delivered to the Somali Armed Forces include those listed below. In addition, Bell 412s have been pictured in Somali Air Force markings. Multiple sources explicitly identify the Somali Air Force as the operator of the aircraft listed, including Bayraktar Akinci UCAVs, and T129 ATAK attack helicopters.

Aircraft	Origin	Type	Variant	Inventory	Notes
Combat aircraft
CAC/PAC JF-17 Thunder	China; Pakistan	Multirole combat aircraft	JF-17 Block 3	0	Total 24 on order
Helicopters
Bell 205	United States	Utility		4	
Bell 412	United States	Utility	412; 412SP; 412EPX	7	
TAI/AgustaWestland T129 ATAK	Turkey	Utility	Phase II	6	Delivered in March and June 2025.
UAVs
Baykar Bayraktar TB2	Turkey	UCAV		At least 5	Delivered on December 2021.
Baykar Bayraktar Akinci	Turkey	UCAV		2	Delivered on March 2025.

=== Former equipment ===
The following table uses Nelson et al.'s 1981 Somali Air Force's aircraft estimates. The SAF purchased two Piaggio P.166-DL3 utility aircraft and two P.166-DL3/MAR maritime patrol aircraft in 1980.

Aircraft	Type	Country of Manufacture	Inventory	Notes
Combat aircraft
MiG-17/F "Fresco"	Fighter-bomber	Soviet Union	54 (MiG-17×27, MiG-17F×27)	
MiG-21MF "Fishbed J"	Interceptor	Soviet Union	33 or 29	
F-6C	Fighter	China	30	
Aermacchi SF.260W	Light attack	Italy	6	
Hawker Hunter FGA.76	Attack / Reconnaissance	United Kingdom	9 (post-war estimatation)	
Transport aircraft
Antonov An-2 "Colt"	Transport	Soviet Union	3	
An-24/-26	Transport	Soviet Union	3	
Douglas C-47 Skytrain	Transport	United States	3	
C-45	Light transport	United States	1	
Aeritalia G.222	Transport	Italy	4	
Helicopters
Mil Mi-4 "Hound"	Utility	Soviet Union	4	
Mil Mi-8 "Hip"	Utility	Soviet Union	8	
AB-204	Utility	United States / Italy	1	
AB-212	Utility	United States / Italy	4	
Trainers
Mikoyan-Gurevich MiG-15UTI "Fagot"	Jet trainer	Soviet Union	4	3 were in active service
MiG-21US Mongol B	Jet trainer	Soviet Union	20	3 were in active service
Yakovlev Yak-11 "Moose"	Trainer	Soviet Union	20	3 were in active service
Piaggio P.148	Primary trainer	Italy	6	
SIAI-Marchetti SM.1019	Training, observation, and light attack aircraft	Italy	6	

== Ranks of the Somali Air Force ==
=== Officers ===
Rank group	General / flag officers			Senior officers			Junior officers
Somali Air Force
Somali Air Force	Sareeye guud	Sareeye gaas	Sareeye guuto	Gashaanle sare	Gashaanle dhexe	Gashaanle	Dhamme	Laba xídígle	Xídígle

=== Enlisted ===
Rank group	Senior NCOs					Junior NCOs		Enlisted
Somali Air Force								No insignia
Somali Air Force	Musharax sarkaal	Sadex xarígle	Laba xarígle	Xarígle	Sadex alífle	Laba alífle	Alífle	Dable

== See also ==
- Chief of the Air Force
- Somali Navy
- Somali Police Force
- Somali Custodial Corps
