= Ali Matan Hashi =

Commander of the Somali Air Force (1927–1978)

Ali Matan Hashi علي متان حاشي
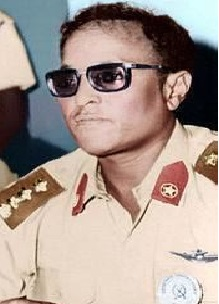

1st Chief of the Somali Air Force

Personal details
- Born: 1927 Hobyo, Italian Somaliland (now Somalia)
- Died: 1978 (aged 50–51)
- Party: XHKS

Military service
- Allegiance: Somalia
- Branch/service: Somali Air Force
- Years of service: 1952–1978
- Rank: Brigadier General
- Commands: Commander in Chief of the Air Force; Minister of Justice; SRC Cabinet Member
- Battles/wars: Aerial Campaign of Ogaden War

Ali Matan Hashi (1927–1978; Somali: Cali Mataan Xashi, Arabic: علي متان حاشي), also known as Ali Matan, was a Somali senior military official and politician. He was the first Somali pilot, and a prominent member of the Supreme Revolutionary Council (SRC).

== History ==
Ali Matan was born in Hobyo into a Marehan Darod family in the Mudug Region of Somalia .

He created the Somali Air Force in 1960, and oversaw the growth of it between 1960 and 1978. A Brigadier General in the air force, he held various political and military positions, including Minister of Justice and Commander of the Air Force. He was also one of the closest advisers of the president.

Ali was born in Hobyo in the Mudug Region of Somalia in 1927. At the age of 17, he joined the Signal Corps of the British Occupation Forces in 1944 where he took upon radio engineering. As it was the norm of many Somali activists at that time, he joined the incipient Somali Youth League in 1944 and was the secretary of the young political party at the Sagag (Segeg) village in Dhagabur District. Following the abolition of the Somaliland Signal Corps in 1947, he joined the Post and Telecommunications department in Mogadishu.

Whilst in Mogadishu; he participated in several protests, notably the Hanoolaato anti-colonial uprising in Jan 1948. In 1950, he was imprisoned by the AFIS (Italian Trusteeship Administration) in Adado (Galgaduud) for drawing a painting depicting a Somali nomad carrying a load of 10 full sacks on his shoulders which indicated the 10 years that the country was to remain under the colonial rule. In the early 1950s, he joined the Aeronautic Department where he served as a deputy director. In 1955, after completing his intermediate education, he joined the then Political and Administrative School. In 1956, he left for Italy where he became the first Somali pilot and air traffic controller. A year later, he was promoted to the rank of second lieutenant in the pre-independence Somali Air Force (Somali Aeronautical Corps). In 1958, he was nominated as the director of airports in Somalia. Given that there were no other Somali pilots, he strived to convince the colonial administration to send 35 Somali students abroad for pilot and aircraft mechanics training.

In 1959, he was promoted to the rank of Lieutenant and was subsequently sent to Italy, where he commenced a training as a first class pilot, according to the type of aircraft then available at that time in Somalia.

Upon his return from Italy in 1960, he was promoted to the rank of Captain and together with his colleagues were transferred to the newly created Somali Air Force. In late 1960, he supervised the first weekly flights connecting the capital city Muqdisho to the second capital Hargeisa. Hargeisa citizens dubbed it as the ‘Cali Mataan Airways’.

In 1963, he was promoted to the rank of major, and towards the end of that year, he was sent to the Soviet Forces Academy in Moscow, where he undertook training as a full-fledged Mig pilot. Upon his return from the Soviet Union in 1965, he was appointed as the new Commander of the Somali Air Force and in 1967 was promoted to the rank of lieutenant colonel.

Ali Matan Hashi was one of the officers who participated in the 1969 coup that overthrew the government. After the take-over, he was incorporated in the newly created Supreme Revolutionary Council (SRC).

In 1970, his rank was elevated to full colonel, and in 1973 he was nominated as an advisor on legal and presidential affairs. In 1974, he became the new chairman of the Legal Affairs Committee of the SRC, which oversaw the introductions of legal reformations in the country. Two years prior to his death in 1978, he was promoted to the rank of brigadier general.

== See also ==
- Muhammad Ali Samatar
- Hussein Kulmiye Afrah
- Abdullah Mohamed Fadil
- Abdirizak Mohamud Abubakar
- Muse Hassan Sheikh Sayid Abdulle
- Abdullahi Ahmed Irro
- Asli Hassan Abade
- Salaad Gabeyre Kediye
