= Asli Hassan Abade =

Somali military aviator

- Asli Xasan Cabaade
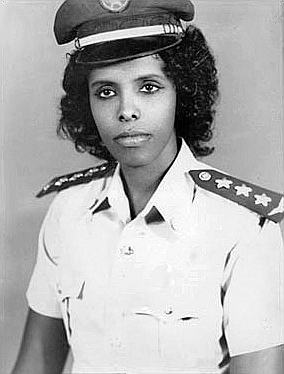
- Asli in the 1970s
- Born: Asli Xasan Cabaade (Calanside); 1 January 1958 (age 68); Buloburde, Trust Territory of Somaliland (present-day Somalia)
- Military career
- Allegiance: (Somalia) Somali Democratic Republic
- Branch: Somali Air Force
- Service years: 1976–1992
- Rank: Captain
- Other work: Activist

Asli Hassan Abade (born 1 January 1958) is a retired Somali air force pilot, military figure, and civil activist. She was the first African female pilot and so far the only female pilot in the Somali Air Force (SAF). As of October 2009, she was living in the U.S. state of Texas. Abade was popular in the Somali Air Force, where she was a pilot from 1976 until the end of 1992.

== Career ==
=== Somali Air Force ===
Abade solo-piloted her first flight on 9 September 1976.

=== Peace campaign ===
In the mid-2000s, Abade waged a peace campaign, encouraging lawmakers to come together and put an end to the long-standing civil conflict in her native Somalia. Attending every major political function dressed in the colors of the Somali flag, she reportedly commanded the respect of all the attendees. For her efforts in the reconciliation process that took place in neighboring Arta, Djibouti, which saw the establishment of the Transitional Federal Government, she was accorded the nickname Calansida ("The Flag-bearer").

Abade describes herself as a "patriot", and as "a strong lady", on account of her military experience.

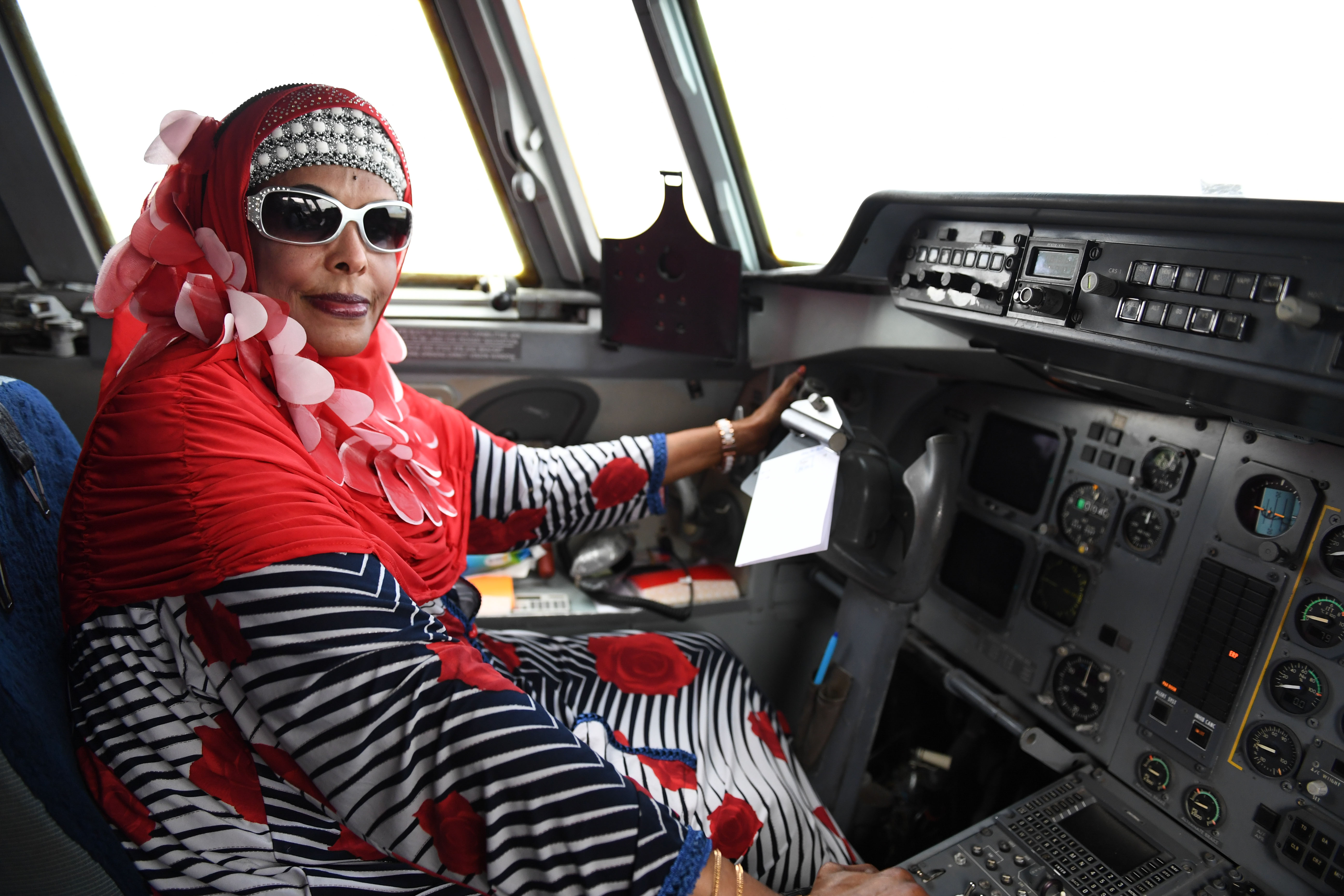
Abade on the flight deck of an aircraft at Aden Abdulle International Airport in Mogadishu, July 2017.

== See also ==
- Women in Somalia
- Ali Matan Hashi
