= Amran Mohamed Ahmed =

Somali author, poet and journalist

Amran Mohamed Ahmed (Somali: Amran Maxamed Axmed; born 12 April 1954 in Hargeisa) is a Somali author, poet and journalist who was selected by the Finnish Refugee Council as "Refugee Woman of the Year" in 2005.

== Refugee Activism ==
Ahmed moved to Finland in 1990 with her husband and youngest child. Shortly after, she began work as a volunteer interpreter to assist Somali refugees, lecture on Somali culture and give interviews to journalists to enable people to understand the backgrounds that many Somali refugees were arriving from. Civil war had broken out following the fall of dictator Siad Barre and Hargeisa was bombed. Ahmed's other children remained with relatives but some later moved to Finland. The first place they stayed at was the Joutseno Reception Center, from where they eventually moved to Vantaa.

During her time in Finland, Ahmed worked hard to advocate for the rights of refugees, especially women and children, and for Somali cultural understanding. This work led to her being named as the Finnish Refugee Council's 'Refugee Woman of the Year' in 2005. In 2011, Ahmed's biography was published: In Search of Peace - Amran Mohamed Ahmed's Story.

== Writing career ==
During her time in Finland, Ahmed wrote poetry and journalism, in Somali and Finish. Her creative works include fairy tales and she has been involved in editing the collection of poems, Nine Autumn Sessions (University Press2002). Her poems have been published in various collections of poems. Ahmed has broadcast on Somali-language family radio for years. She has also published on the theme of Somali-ness.

In 2007, Ahmed moved to London where she works as a journalist for the Somali-based Raad TV International and continues to write and publish poetry.

== Early life ==
Ahmed was born in Hargeisa into a family with two children. Her father, Mohamed Ahmed Muse, worked for the British army at the time, as Somalia was a British colony. Ahmed attended school in her hometown and studied in the capital Mogadishu. She later made educational materials for the Somali Ministry of Education. Ahmed had five children from two marriages.
