= Somali Women's Democratic Organization =

Women's organization in Somalia

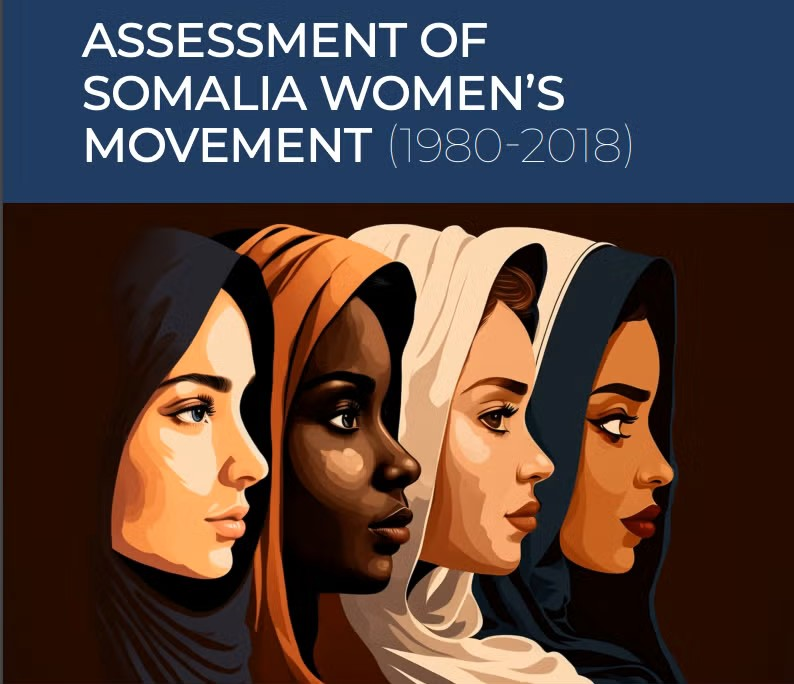
Assement of Somalia women's movement (1980‍–‍2018) | UN women – Africa

The Somali Women's Democratic Organization (SWDO) was a women's organization in Somalia, founded in 1977. It belonged to the Somali Revolutionary Socialist Party during the regime of President Siad Barre.

== History ==
The SWDO was established with the support of President Siad Barre in 1977 in memory of Hawo Tako, a female member of the anti-colonialist Somali Youth League, who was killed by the Italian forces in 1948. It was established to enforce the policy of women's rights of the Communist Barre regime, and the regime appointed its female leadership in order to maintain female compliance with the government.

At the time of the foundation of the SWDO, women's rights and equality was only barely initiated in Somalia. After Somalia gained its independence from colonial powers in 1960, both men and women were given the right to vote. In practice, however, it was not until after Supreme Revolutionary Council (Somalia) came to power in 1969,that women's rights were prioritized by the government. The Family Law of 1975 gave equal rights to women and men regarding marriage, divorc, and inheritance, and restricted polygamy. Two years later, the SWDO was established.

The policy of gender equality enforced by the government through the SWDO had a marked effect on women's position. Women participated in society in a number of ways, such as female school enrollment, women in the workplace, women's participation in politics and the military, and all increased during the 1970s and the 1980s.

After the fall of the Barre regime in 1991, Islamic extremism effectively eliminated the legal rights of women in Somalia.
