= Maryan Ahmed Ali =

Politician from Puntland

Minister of Women's Development & Family Affairs
- In office August 2017 – February 2019
- Appointed by: Abdiweli Gaas
- Succeeded by: Amina Hajji Osman

Ministry of Women Development and Family Affairs
- Incumbent
- Assumed office 10 March 2024

Maryan Ahmed Ali (Somali: Maryan Axmed Cali) is a politician from Puntland, who is a former and current Minister of Women's Development and Family Affairs (MoWDAFA). She served in the cabinet of former president Abdiweli Gaas. During her term she spoke out against gender-based violence, in particular in relation to maternal and infant mortality. It was also under her tenure that the Puntland Forensic Laboratory opened, with the explicit brief of supporting law enforcers to prosecute more rapists. Since she served as current minister of Women.

In December 2018 she launched the Puntland Action Plan for Children. In the same month she launched Puntland's inaugural participation in the International Day for the Elimination of Violence Against Women. As a result of the 2019 elections, she was succeeded in post by Amina Hajji Osman. Subsequently she ran for election as Chief of the Puntland Human Rights Office, but lost to Mar Said Mumin.
