= Ministry of Women Development and Family Affairs =

Puntland government Ministry of Women Development and Family Affairs

- Wasaaradda Horumarinta Haweenka iyo Arrimaha Qoyska ee Dawladda Puntland وزارة تنمية المرأة وشؤون الأسرة في بونتلاند

Agency overview
- Formed: 25 January 2005
- Jurisdiction: Government of Puntland
- Minister responsible: Maryan Ahmed Ali
- Website: https://mowdafa.pl.so/

The Puntland Ministry of Women Development and Family Affairs MoWDAFA (Somali: Wasaaradda Horumarinta Haweenka iyo Arrimaha Qoyska ee Dawladda Puntland) is a government body tasked with developing the Puntland Government public policies on issues affecting women and children and family affairs. The ministry was formed in 2005 as one of the initial measures of President Mohamud Muse Hersi; the first minister was Asha Gelle Dirie, the current minister is Maryan Ahmed Ali since 2024.

== List of ministers ==
- Asha Gelle Dirie
- Anisa Hajimumin
- Maryan Ahmed Ali– current
