= Adar Ismail Jurati =

Minister of Women and Family Affairs of Jubaland

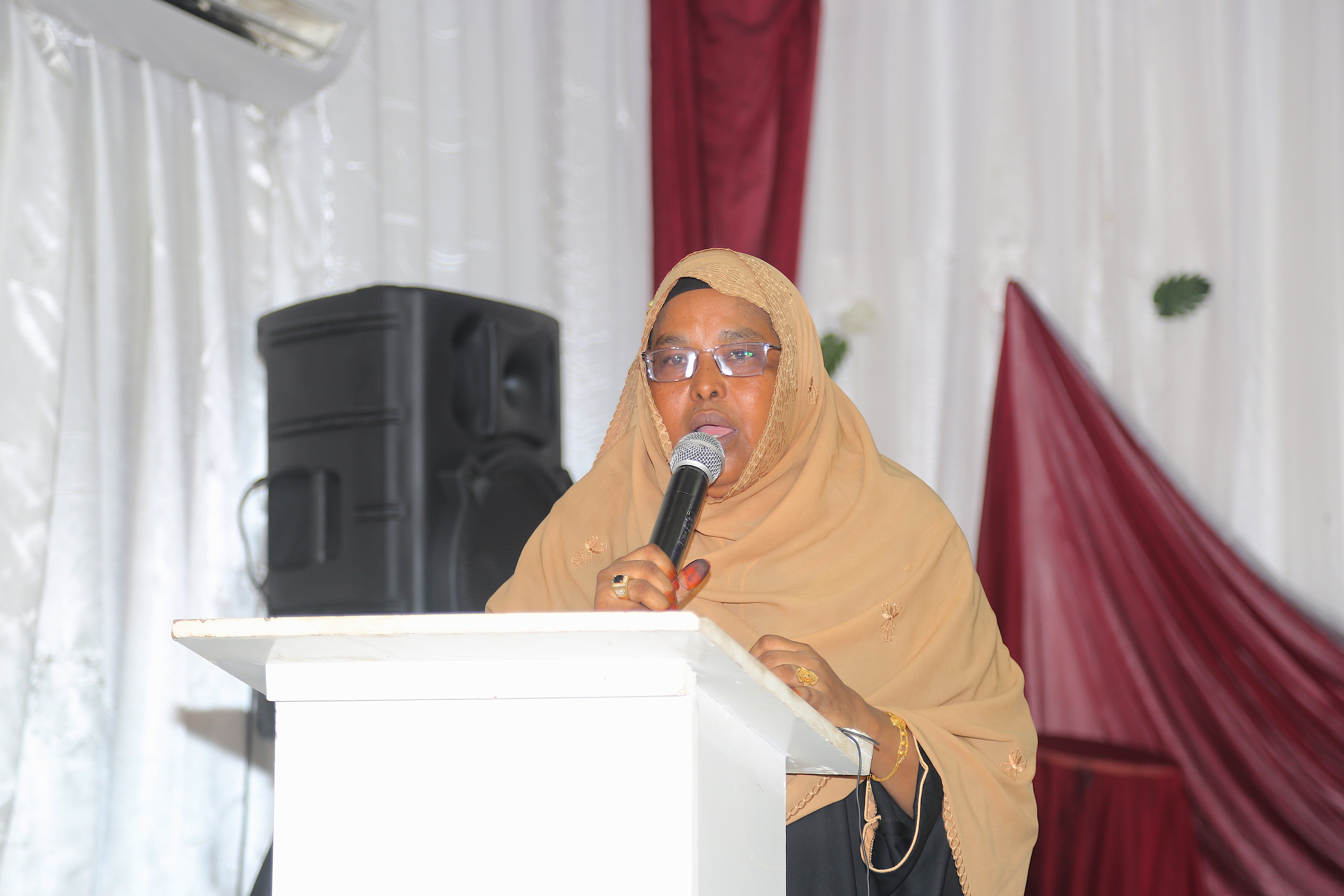
- Jurati launching 16 Days of Activism campaign (2021)

Jubaland Minister for Women and Family Affairs

Personal details
- Citizenship: Somalian

Adar Ismail Jurati is a Somali politician, who is the Jubaland Minister for Women and Family Affairs. She is an advocate for the annual 16 Days of Activism campaign, which focuses on the elimination of gender-based violence and early marriage. In 2021 she led signing of a memorandum of understanding between the Ministry of Women and Family Affairs and the Somali Women Solidarity Organization. In 2022 she led a consultative meeting with government officials and people who perform female genital mutilation (FGM) with a view to stopping the practice in the Kismayo area. At the meeting Jurati promised employment for women who stopped perpetuating FGM in their communities.
