= Finnish Refugee Council =

Finnish humanitarian organisation

- Founded: 1965
- Type: Humanitarian NGO
- Location: Helsinki, Ireland
- Fields: Refugees, IDPs, Activism, NGO
- Key people: Annu Lehtinen (Executive Director)
- Website: pakolaisapu.fi/en/

The Finnish Refugee Council is a humanitarian, non-governmental organisation that protects the rights of people affected by displacement.

== History ==
The Finnish Refugee Council was founded in 1965 as a small organization that raised funds for the UN Refugee Agency. The council has evolved over time, becoming an NGO and embarking on a range of projects.

== Core activities ==
The council has four themes aimed at the rights of refugees, strengthening resilience, equal social participation and adaptation of the entire community. To further the organization's efforts to call for better integration and equality in Finland, it has announced a 'Female Refugee of the Year' since 1998, and a 'Male Refugee of the Year' since 2016.
