= Asha Gelle Dirie =

Somali politician and civil society activist

- Caasho Geelle Diiriye عائشة جيلي ديري
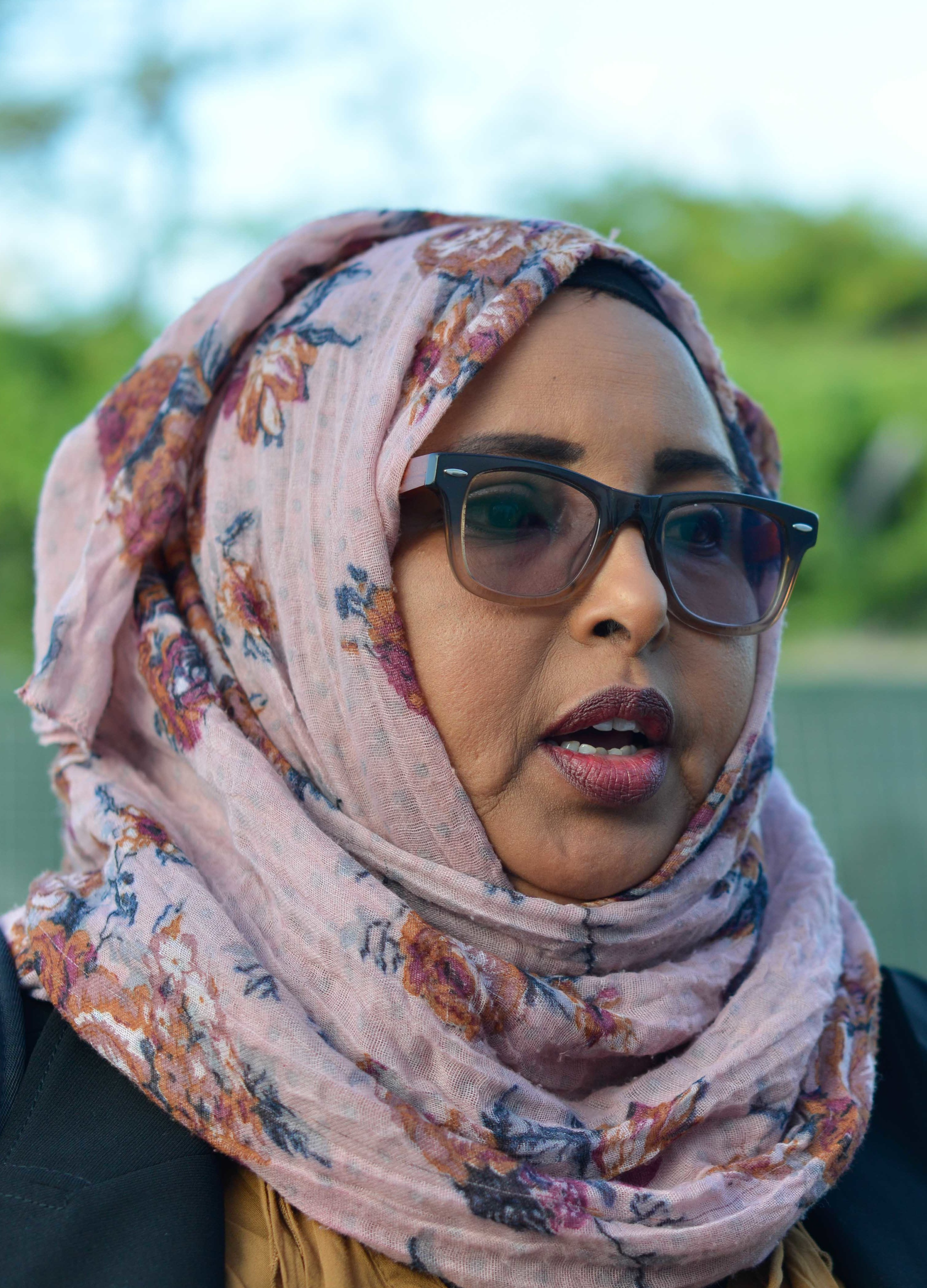

Member of Parliament of Puntland
- In office 1 August 1998 – 1 January 2005
- Preceded by: Position established

Ministry of Women Development and Family Affairs
- In office 25 January 2005 – 15 September 2012
- Preceded by: Position established
- Succeeded by: Halima Hassan Haji Osman

Chairperson of the Constitutional Review and Implementation Commission
- In office May 2014 – 6 May 2015
- Preceded by: Position established

Personal details
- Born: 1966 (age 59–60) Galkayo, Somalia
- Education: Lafoole College of Education

Asha Gelle Dirie (Somali: Caasha Geelle Diriye, Arabic: آشا جيلي ديري; born 1966) is a Somali politician and civil society activist. From 2005 to 2012, she served as the Ministry of Women Development and Family Affairs of the Government of Puntland. Dirie is also the founder and executive director of The Asha Gelle Foundation (TAG Foundation). Also she served as the chairperson of the federal Constitutional Review and Implementation Commission between 2014 and 2015.

== Personal life ==
Dirie was born in 1966 in Galkayo, the capital of the north-central Mudug region of Somalia. She hails from the Omar Mohamoud sub-clan of the Majeerteen Harti Darod.

For her post-secondary education, Dirie earned a degree from the Somali National University's Lafoole College of Education in Mogadishu.

== Career ==
=== Early career ===
Upon graduation, Dirie initially served as a teacher in the national capital.

From 1984 to 1988, she worked for Somali Women Education. She later founded Somali Women Concerns in 1988, a local NGO. The organization used to carry out work in Mogadishu and Kismayo, and still has a presence in Puntland's major cities. Dirie also chaired We Are Women Activists (WAWA).

=== Puntland government ===
From 1998 to 2005, Dirie was a Member of the House of Representatives of Puntland. She represented the Mudug region constituency.

Between 2005 and 2012, Dirie also served as the Minister of Women Development and Family Affairs of Puntland and was replaced by Halima Hassan Haji Osman. The ministry grew considerably under her tenure, transforming into a robust governmental entity. In this capacity, she was among the 2011 jury members of the Puntland Education Fund, a state-run scholarship reward system for outstanding local students.

=== TAG Foundation ===
Additionally, Dirie is the founder and executive director of The Asha Gelle Foundation (TAG Foundation), a Puntland-based NGO.

=== Constitutional Review and Implementation Commission ===
In May 2014, Dirie was appointed to the new Constitutional Review and Implementation Commission. Gelle serves as the government committee's Chairperson. The five-member executive body is tasked with overseeing reform of the Provisional Federal Constitution (PFC). Puntland President Abdiweli Mohamed Ali welcomed the development, expressing confidence in the appointees and noting that Dirie was Puntland's representative on the panel. On 19 June 2014, the Federal Parliament approved the government committee, with 139 MPs voting in favor, 9 voting against, and 10 abstaining.

On 16 July 2014, the independent Constitutional Review and Implementation Commission held its inaugural meeting in Mogadishu. The gathering was attended by a number of senior government officials, including President Hassan Sheikh Mohamud. Gelle and other panel members therein discussed various federal matters, among which were constitutional amendment procedures, public consultation, and the committee's duty protocols.

In March 2015, the Constitutional Review Commission completed the first phase of its constitutional review, with the second phase slated to begin shortly afterwards. According to Chairperson Gelle, the first phase involved ascertaining any technical or political uncertainties in the Provision Federal Constitution. Among these were whether the country should have a Prime Minister or a Deputy President, and which city should serve as the national capital. Gelle estimated that around 85% of the constitutional impasses were technical in nature, while the remainder were political.

On 6 May 2015, Gelle stepped down as the Chairperson of the Constitutional Review and Implementation Commission. She cited a lack of sufficient time left for the panel to complete its allotted tasks as the main reason for her resignation. Gelle suggested that some committee members had been working too slowly to meet the deadline, and also indicated that there was a dearth of funds necessary to manage the commission's affairs independently.
