= Anisa Hajimumin =

Former government minister

Anisa Hajimumin أنيسة حاجي المؤمن

Ministry of Women Development and Family Affairs
- In office 13 Feb 2014 – 18 Jan 2015
- President: Abdiweli Gaas
- Vice President: Abdihakim Abdullahi Haji Omar
- Preceded by: Halimo Haji Hassan

Personal details
- Born: Puntland, Somalia
- Education: Metropolitan State University; Hamline University

Anisa Abdulkadir Hajimumin (Somali: Anisa Cabdulqaadir Xaajimuumin, Arabic: أنيسة حاجي المؤمن) (born November 20, 1978) is a Somali American politician, social activist and writer. She previously served as Puntland Minister of Women and Family Affairs.

== Background ==
Hajimumin was born in the Puntland region, situated in northeastern Somalia. She later moved to Minneapolis, where she earned a BA in Women Studies from Metropolitan State University. She also graduated in Public Administration specializing on public policy analysis and human resource development at Hamline University. Additionally, Hajimumin previously worked as an immigration paralegal Southern Minnesota Regional Legal Services.

In 2013, she founded Hajimumin & Associates, an NGO focused on designing workshops for youth development and women's empowerment.

== Minister of Women & Family Affairs ==
On 13 February 2014, Hajimumin officially took office in Puntland's state capital, Garowe. Former Minister Halimo Haji Hassan handed over to the new minister documents containing the recent developments achieved by the previous team of the ministry and pending plans. Hajimumin thanked the previous minister and vowed to protect and strengthen women's rights.
