= Hawo Tako =

Somali activist (1925–1948)

Hawo osman [Taako]
- Born: 1925; Kebri Beyah (woreda)
- Died: 1948 (aged 22–23); Mogadishu, Somalia

Hawo Tako (1925–1948) was a prominent Somali activist. Hawo Osman was born in Kebri Beyah from the Abaskuul clan and in 1925 and was activist in the (Somali Youth League) It was a liberation movement against colonialism that emerged after World War II. They spoke in the name of Greater Somalia (soomaliweyn) However, due to clashes with colonial forces, she sustained many serious injuries, which led to her death in 1948 at the age of 23.

== Biography ==
Hawo Tako, also known as Xaawo Taako or Hawa Osman, A member of SYL, Tako participated in the 1948 riots in Mogadishu that followed the visit of the Four-Power Commission, where she was killed. 14 Somalis were killed during the Mogadishu massacre of 1948, including Hawo Tako, who tried to protect her people.

In 1977, the Somali Women's Democratic Organization was established with the support of President Siad Barre in 1977 in memory of Hawo Tako, a female member of the anti-colonialist Somali Youth League, who was killed during the riots (some sources claim she was killed while trying to stop the killing of Italians) in 1948.

== Notes ==
- Castagno, Margaret (1975). Historical dictionary of Somalia. Scarecrow Press. ISBN 0-8108-0830-7.
- Kaplan, Irving (1977). Area handbook for Somalia. U.S. Govt. Print. Off.
