= List of Somalists =

This is a list of Somalists. These scholars specialize in Somali Studies, the scholarly term for research concerning Somali people and Greater Somalia.

== Notable Somalist scholars ==
- Abdalla Omer Mansur – linguistics and anthropology
- Abdi Ismail Samatar – geography
- Abdi Mohamed Kusow – sociology
- Abdisalam Abdulle Garjeh - Pop Culture and Urban History
- Abdiweli Mohamed Ali - Economics
- Prof. Abdisalam Issa-Salwe – information systems
- Abdullahi Hagi Bashir Ismail – history and politics
- Abdul Ahmed III - Political Economy and Global Strategy
- Abdurahman Moalim Abdullahi Badiyow – history and religion
- Ahmed Ismail Samatar – International Relations
- Ali A. Abdi - anthropology and sociology
- Ali Jimale Ahmed – history and linguistics
- Annarita Puglielli – linguistics
- Bogumił Witalis Andrzejewski – linguistics
- Cawo Mohamed Abdi – Sociology, Politics and Religion
- Charles Geshekter – history
- David D. Laitin – politics and history
- Enrico Cerulli – history and linguistics
- Harold C. Fleming – anthropology and linguistics
- I.M. Lewis – anthropology and history
- Lee Cassanelli – history
- Lidwien Kapteijns – history
- Martin Orwin – linguistics
- Helmi Ben Meriem -literature
- Mohamed Abdi Gandi – anthropology
- Mohamed Haji Mukhtar – history
- Mohamed Haji Rabi – linguistics
- Mohamed Diriye Abdullahi – linguistics
- Musa Haji Ismail Galal – history and linguistics
- Mustafa Feiruz – linguistics
- Neville Chittick – history and archaeology
- Osman Yusuf Kenadid – history, science and philosophy
- Said Sheikh Samatar – linguistics and sociology
- Shire Jama Ahmed – linguistics and sociology
- Virginia Luling – history
- Sada Mire – archaeology and history
- Hussein M. Adam – politics and history

== See also ==
- Somali Studies
