= Somali studies =

Somali studies is the scholarly term for research concerning Somalis and Greater Somalia. It consists of several disciplines, such as poetry, history, anthropology, sociology, linguistics, historiography, geography, and archaeology. The field draws from old Somali chronicles, records and oral literature, in addition to written accounts and traditions about Somalis from explorers and geographers in the Horn of Africa and the Middle East. The Somali Studies International Association is the primary organization for Somalist scholars. Bildhaan, Somali Studies, Horn of Africa and the Anglo-Somali Society Journal likewise serve as the field's main periodicals. Since 1980, prominent Somalist scholars from around the world have also gathered annually to hold the International Congress of Somali Studies.

== History ==
The academic platform that would become Somali studies has its formal origins with religious, linguistic and historical research done by 18th and 19th century Somali scholars, such as Uways al-Barawi and Shaykh Aidarus. However, Somalis since antiquity have exchanged ideas with polities in North Africa, West Asia, South Asia and as far as East Asia. Through early 20th century scholars like Osman Yusuf Kenadid and the polymath Musa Haji Ismail Galal, other disciplines such as anthropology, sociology and archaeology would eventually form part of Somali studies.

Kenadid published many works on various subjects related to Somali history and science, including textbooks on the Somali language, astronomy, geography and Somali philosophy. He borrowed significantly from the vast ancient Somali cultural repository, working towards a renaissance of this rich past. Galal later documented the Somali astrological, meteorological and calendrical systems. He devoted two major works to traditional Somali science, The terminology and practice of Somali weather lore, astronomy, and astrology (1968) and Stars, seasons and weather in Somali pastoral traditions (1970), both of which are regarded as classics in Somali studies.

== Fields of study ==
=== Archaeology ===
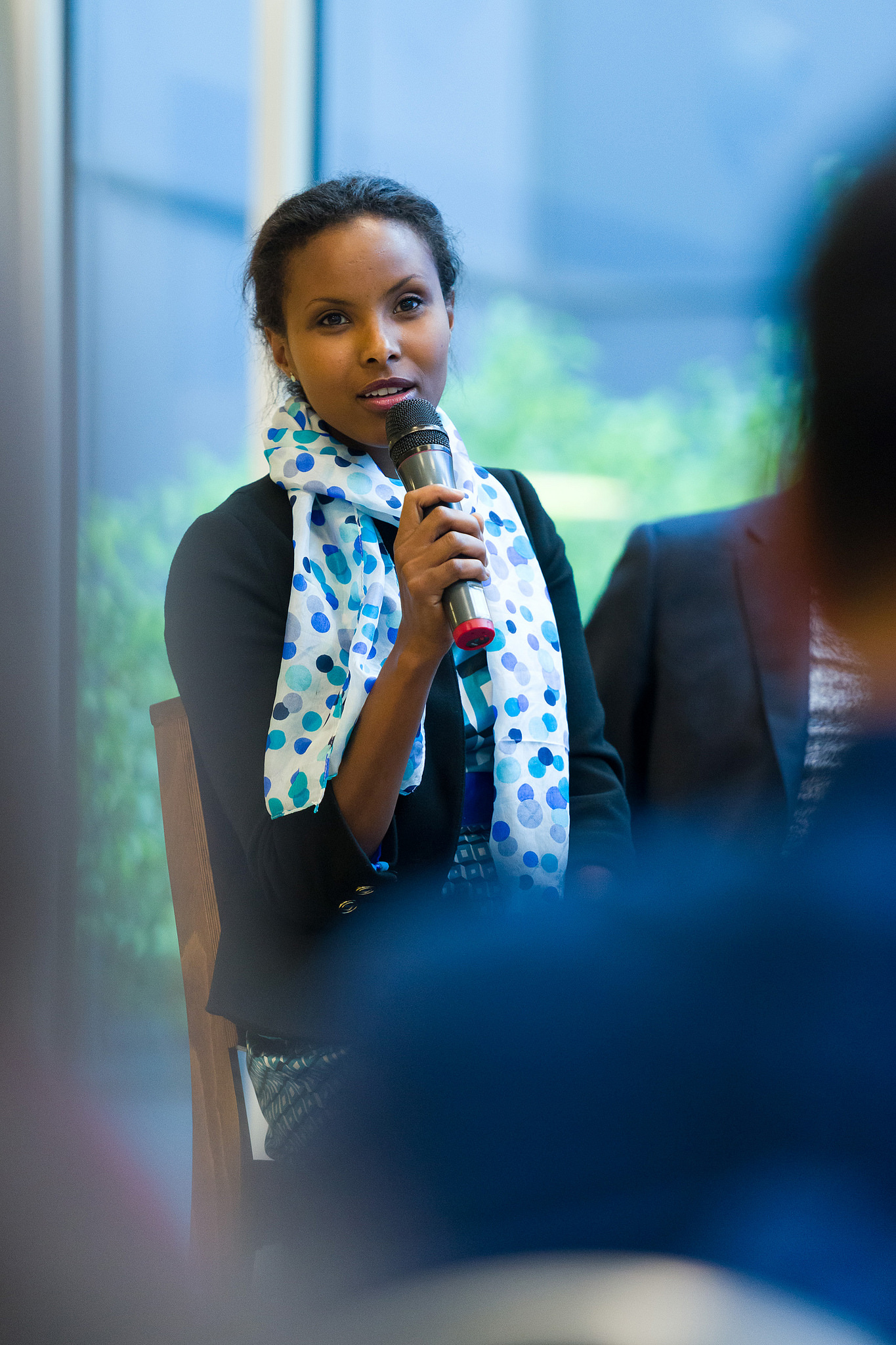
Sada Mire Somali Archaeologist

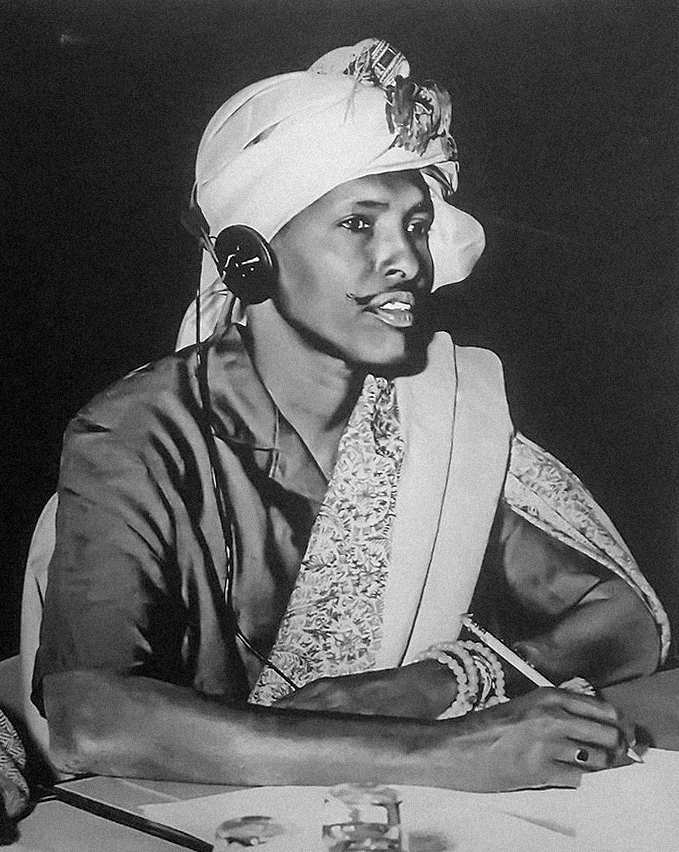
Musa Haji Ismail Galal was a Somali polymath who was active as a writer, scholar, linguist, poet, historian, anthropologist, and meteorologist. He is notable for being chairman of the Somali Language Committee.

One of the earliest examples of archaeology in Somalia can be traced back to the 19th century when George Revoil a French explorer excavated several ancient sites in northern Somalia where he found large quantities of glass and pottery, including Roman pottery. After independence, Somali government officials in collaboration with Soviet and British archaeologists began excavating various parts of Somalia during the 1970s. In late 1975, Neville Chittick led a British-Somali archaeological expedition in the northern half of Somalia. Financed by the Somali authorities, the reconnaissance mission found numerous examples of historical artefacts and structures, including ancient coins, pottery, drystone buildings, cairns, mosques, walled enclosures, standing stones and platform monuments. Many of the finds were of pre-Islamic origin and associated with ancient settlements described by the 1st century Periplus of the Erythraean Sea, among other documents.

=== Anthropology ===
Somali anthropology studies the way of life of the Somali people. Somalist anthropologists have in various books and papers documented traditional Somali social systems such as the ancient Xeer (customary law) and the clan system, and examined their role within Somali society. In the field of Somali Islamic studies, scholars like Ioan Lewis, Said Sheikh Samatar and Lee V. Cassanelli have written on the traditional Muslim structure of Somali society in books such as A Pastoral Democracy: A Study of Pastoralism and Politics Among the Northern Somali of the Horn of Africa (1961), Oral poetry and Somali nationalism: the case of Sayyid Mahammad 'Abdille Hasan (1982) and The Shaping of Somali Society: Reconstructing the History of a Pastoral People, 1600 to 1900 (1982). Enrico Cerulli and Mohamed Diriye Abdullahi in their respective works Somalia: scritti vari editi ed inediti (1957) and Culture and Customs of Somalia (2001) have also summarized the origins and ethnogenesis of the Somali people.

=== Linguistics ===
In terms of linguistics, Somali studies examines the inter-relationships between the Somali language and other related Afro-Asiatic languages. Somali is the best documented language from the Cushitic branch of Afro-Asiatic, with academic studies of it dating from before 1900. Linguists such as Bogumil Witalis Andrzejewski, Giorgio Banti, Annarita Puglielli, Cabdalla Cumar Mansuur, Mohamed Haji Rabi, Mohamed Diriye Abdullahi and Martin Orwin are considered among the foremost scholars on the study of the Somali language and the relation it has to the tongues spoken by related neighboring ethnic groups, such as the Afars, Oromos and Bejas. Mustafa Abdullahi Feiruz also focuses on the standardization of written Somali, and Somali language's links with Arabic.

Georgi Kapchits, a Russian scholar, is the leading scholar studying Somali proverbs. He has analyzed Somali proverbs and also published a collection of Somali proverbs.

== Organizations ==
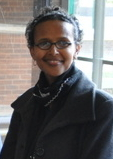
Somali studies scholar Cawo Mohamed Abdi.

The primary organization overseeing the field is the Somali Studies International Association.

== Journals ==
=== Peer-reviewed ===
- Bildhaan: An International Journal of Somali Studies (ISSN 1528-6258)
- Horn of Africa: An Independent Journal (ISSN 0161-4703)
- Journal of Somali Studies (ISSN 2056-5674)
- Somali Studies: A Peer-Reviewed Academic Journal for Somali Studies (ISSN 2414-6501)
- Anglo-Somali Society Journal (ISSN 1361-4320)

== Conferences ==
Since its inaugural gathering in Mogadishu between July 6-13th, 1980, the International Congress of Somali Studies has been held to discuss developments in the field. The 10th Congress was held in Djibouti City in December 2007. The triennial Somali Studies Conference also brings together some scholars and specialists in Somali studies. As of 2021, Jigjiga has hosted the 14th International Congress of Somali Studies.

== Award ceremonies ==
Since the early 1970s, the Academy of Somali Studies began to hold professional award-winning poetry competitions after having been inspired by the traditional poetry competitions annually held throughout Somalia. The Somali Studies Association recognizes Somali scholars whose work concerning Somali studies stands out with the Musa Galaal award, a prize named after the Somali polymath Musa Haji Ismail Galal. In 1994, Charles L. Geshekter, Professor of History at California State University, Chico, created an endowment for this award. Geshekter's mother and Musa Galaal (1914–1980) were friends. A financial prize is also awarded annually.

== Prominent Somalist scholars ==
- Abdillahi Diiriye Guled - Literature and Linguistics
- Bogumil Witalis Andrzejewski – linguistics
- Enrico Cerulli – history and linguistics
- Ali Jimale Ahmed – history and linguistics
- David D. Laitin – politics and history
- Abdi Mohamed Kusow – sociology and anthropology
- Abdi Ismail Samatar – geography
- Ahmed Ismail Samatar – international relations
- Jama Musse Jama – ethnomathematics, computational linguistics
- Harold C. Fleming – anthropology and linguistics
- Kenneth Menkhaus - political science
- Ali A. Abdi - anthropology and sociology
- Martin Orwin – linguistics
- Mohamed Abdi Mohamed – anthropology
- Mohamed Diriye Abdullahi – linguistics
- Mohamed Haji Mukhtar – history
- Musa Haji Ismail Galal – history and linguistics
- Neville Chittick – history and archaeology
- Said Sheikh Samatar – linguistics and sociology
- Sada Mire – archaeology and history
- Hussein M. Adam – politics and history
- Hamdi Sh. Mohamed - Women History

== See also ==
- Ethiopian Studies
- African Studies
- Middle Eastern Studies
- Islamic Studies
