= B. W. Andrzejewski =

Polish-born linguist on the Somali language

Bogumił Witalis Andrzejewski
- Born: 1 February 1922; Poznań, Poland
- Died: 1 December 1994 (aged 72); Hemel Hempstead, England
- Other names: Goosh, Guś
- Title: Professor of Cushitic Languages and Literatures
- Spouse: Sheila Weekes (married 1946)

Academic background
- Education: Oriel College, Oxford (BA 1947), SOAS (PhD 1962)
- Doctoral advisor: J. R. Firth

Bogumił Witalis "Goosh" Andrzejewski (1 February 1922 – 1 December 1994) was a Polish-born, British-naturalised linguist whose research focused on the Somali language.

Lists of Andrzejewski's works can be found in Appleyard & Hayward (1988, pp. 16–25), Banti & Ricci (1992, pp. 152–160), Johnson (1995, pp. 18–30), and Hayward & Lewis (1996, pp. xv–xxii).

== General references ==
- Adam, Anita Suleiman (14 December 1994). "A Wise Scholar in Somalia; Obituary: BW Andrzejewski". The Guardian. London. p. 16.
- Appleyard, David; Hayward, Dick (1988). "B.W. Andrzejewski". In Bechhaus-Gerst, Marianne; Serzisko, Fritz (eds.). Cushitic-Omotic: Papers from the International Symposium on Cushitic and Omotic Languages, Cologne, January 6–9, 1986. Hamburg: Helmut Buske Verlag GmbH. pp. 13–25.
- Banti, Giorgio; Ricci, Lanfranco (1992). "Bogumił Witalis Andrzejewski "Goosh" (1922–1994)". Rassegna di Studi Etiopici (in Italian). 36: 143–160. JSTOR 41299779.
- Finnegan, Ruth; Orwin, Martin (2011). "Introduction". Journal of African Cultural Studies. 23 (1, Carried by a Mystic Wind: B. W. Andrzejewski on the Somali Passion for Poetry and Language): 1–3. doi:10.1080/13696815.2011.581450. S2CID 216152857.
- Hayward, R. J.; Lewis, I. M. (1996). "Introduction". In Hayward, R. J.; Lewis, I. M. (eds.). Voice and Power: The Culture of Language in North-East Africa. Essays in Honour of B. W. Andrzejewski. African Languages and Cultures, Supplement. Vol. 3. London: SOAS. pp. ix–xxiii. JSTOR 586649.
- Herbstein, Denis (May–June 1991). "The Alphabet War". Africa Report. 36 (3): 67–69. ISSN 0001-9836.
- Johnson, John William (1995). "Bogumił Witalis "Goosh" Andrzejewski: Emeritus Professor of Cushitic Languages and Literatures school of Oriental and African Studies, University of London (1 February 1922 – 2 December 1994)". Northeast African Studies. New Series. 2 (1): 7–30. doi:10.1353/nas.1995.0032. JSTOR 41931189. S2CID 145251437.
- Lewis, I. M. (6 December 1994). "Professor B. W. Andrzejewski". Obituaries. The Independent. No. 2537. London. p. 14.
- Orwin, Martin (1996). "Professor Bogumił Witalis Andrzejewski 1922–1994". Bulletin of the School of Oriental and African Studies. 59 (1): 125–128. doi:10.1017/S0041977X00028603. JSTOR 619393.
- Piłaszewicz, Stanisław (1995). "Professor Bogumił Witalis Andrzejewski (1 February 1922 – 2 December 1994)". Africana Bulletin. 43: 76–85. ISSN 0002-029X.
- Piłaszewicz, Stanisław (2012). "Professor Bogumił Witalis Andrzejewski: His Life, Scientific Activity, and Poetry" (PDF). Folia Orientalia. 49: 391–399. ISSN 0015-5675.
- Samatar, Said S. (1998). "Remembering B. W. Andrzejewski: Poland's Somali Genius". Research in African Literatures. 29 (3): 208–219. JSTOR 3820630.
