= University of Southern Somalia =

University in Somalia

- Established: 5 May 2004
- Vice-Chancellor: Prof. Dr. Mohamed Abdulkadir Eno
- Location: Baidoa, Bay, Somalia
- Campus: Baidoa

The University of Southern Somalia is a higher education center based in Baidoa, Somalia.

The university was founded by Somali Professor Abdi Kusow.

== History ==
After a considerable planning stage, the institution was established in 2004 by a group of Somali scholars and intellectuals. Inaugural classes began the following year, in August 2005. University representatives concurrently announced plans to develop four colleges: the College of Science, Agriculture, and Engineering, the College of Social Science, the College of Education, the College of Health and Environmental Sciences, and the College of Jurisprudence. Additionally, an Institute of Social Research is being developed. Plans are also in the works to construct a new campus in an area around 15 km north of Baidoa, as well as two new branches in two other principal cities in the Bay region.

== Programs ==
In 2025, the university offers 23 degree programs. The initial programs are as listed below.

- College of Education
- College of Science, Agriculture, and Engineering
- College of Health and Environmental Sciences
- College of Jurisprudence
- College of Social Sciences
- School of Management and Economics
- Institute of Research and Training (IRT)
