= Ismail Ali Ismail =

Ismail Ali Ismail Geeldoon إسماعيل علي إسماعيل
- Born: British Somaliland
- Occupations: writer, diplomat

Ismail Ali Ismail "Geeldoon" (Somali: Ismaaciil Cali Ismaaciil, Arabic: إسماعيل علي إسماعيل) is a Somali writer and former diplomat.

== Personal life ==
Ismail was born in Somaliland, in the former north-western British Somaliland protectorate.

For his secondary education, he attended Aden College in Aden, Yemen, passing his GCE levels in 1960. Ismail first gained an interest in governance and public administration during this early period. His initial exposure to the subject was through a book by Ismail al-Azhari, Sudan's then and first Prime Minister. Ismail later studied political science at university, reading Austin Ranney's The Governing of Men for a freshman class. He graduated with a diploma in Government and Public Administration, and subsequently earned a master's degree in Local Government and Administration.

Ismail speaks several languages, notably Somali, Arabic and English.

== Career ==
Ismail was previously a civil servant in the government of Somalia. He also served as a longtime United Nations Economic Commission for Africa (ECA) officer centered in Addis Ababa, Ethiopia.

In 1995, along with Said Sheikh Samatar, Ismail took part in an international symposium in Asmara, Eritrea for the writing of the Constitution of Eritrea. He worked closely on the legislation with Eritrean and international experts. The following year, he also helped train senior government officials in the Eritrean capital.

In 2009, Ismail was a guest speaker at the Puntland Diaspora Conference held in Minneapolis, Minnesota. He addressed the Virtues of Federalism panel on the advantages and disadvantages of a federal political system.

In 2010, Ismail published Governance: The Scourge and Hope of Somalia, a work on good governance principles based on his extensive diplomatic experience. He recommends therein incorporating elements of the traditional Somali customary law (Xeer) into modern government structures.

Besides writing and consultancy, Ismail is also a regular contributor to WardheerNews.

== Selected works ==
Books

- Governance: The Scourge and Hope of Somalia (2010)

Articles

- The rural development campaign: its implications for the development of local government (1973)
- Federal structure for Somalia: an upas tree of a panacea? (2000)
- The Somali federation: crossing the initial hurdles (2014)
