= Sondra Hale =

Sondra Hale is Professor Emeritus of Anthropology and Gender Studies at the University of California, Los Angeles (UCLA); former Co-editor of the Journal of Middle East Women's Studies and former Co-Chair, Islamic Studies. Her regional interests are in Africa and the Middle East, focusing mainly on Sudan and Eritrea (where she has done research on women who were former guerrillas of the Eritrean People’s Liberation Front).

== Education ==
Prof. Hale was educated at University of California, Los Angeles, where she received her B.A. in English Literature, M.A. in African Studies and a Ph.D. in Anthropology. She has taught at the University of Khartoum (Sudan), at California Institute of the Arts, and at California State Universities at Long Beach and Northridge.

== Publications ==
Prof. Hale has published many articles and book chapters on the topics of gendered war, conflict, and genocide; social movements; international gender studies; gender and citizenship; diaspora studies; cultural studies, and boycotts and academic freedom.

Hale is the author of the book Gender Politics in Sudan: Islamism, Socialism, and the State.

Hale has co-edited an e-book on feminist art, From Site to Vision: The Woman’s Building in Contemporary Culture, which will be published by Otis College of Art and Design in 2011. Hale co-edited Sudan’s Killing Fields: Perspectives on Genocide, with Laura Beny.

Recent journal articles of hers appeared in Urban Anthropology, Cultural Dynamics, Journal of Middle East Women’s Studies, Feminist Economics, Northeast African Studies, Amerasia Journal, and New Political Science, among others. She has also published important articles in Ufahamu.

Books where her chapters have appeared are: Gender, War and Militarism; Women and Globalization in the Arab Middle East; Gender and Citizenship in Muslim Communities; Race and Identity in the Nile Valley, and Female Circumcision and the Politics of Knowledge.

Her other work in progress is on the politics of memory, gender and perpetual-conflict situations, and political organizing in exile.

== Activism and critical reception of her position on FGM ==
Prof. Hale is an activist academic who was a co-founder of Feminists in Support of Palestinian Women; founder and coordinator of the Darfur Task Force; founder and coordinator of California Scholars for Academic Freedom; and co-founder of U.S. Committee for the Academic and Cultural Boycott of Israel. Hale’s activism also includes various anti-war/anti-occupation activities (Iraq, Palestine, Lebanon), and civil rights/human rights issues.

In an article about Hale's long lasting "self-imposed silence" regarding the issue of Female Genital Cutting or FGM, Ellen Gruenbaum discussed both Hale's "cautionary reasons" for not writing about this subject for many years, as well as ways to positively engage in the discussion of this practice.

== Awards ==
In addition to various teaching awards Prof. Hale was given the Fair and Open Academic Environment Award from UCLA (popularly known as the “diversity award”) and has received awards from National Science Foundation, American Association of University Women, National Endowment for the Humanities, Fulbright, and others. She has chaired or directed three Women’s Studies Programs, including UCLA’s.

== Books ==
- Gender Politics In Sudan: Islamism, Socialism, And The State. Routledge. ISBN 978-0-429-96880-8.
- (with Terry Wolverton) From Site to Vision: The Woman's Building in Contemporary Culture, 2004.
