= Ufahamu =

Ufahamu: A Journal of African Studies
- Discipline: African studies
- Language: English
- Edited by: Amed Galo Lopez

Publication details
- History: 1970–present
- Publisher: James S. Coleman African Studies Center, UCLA (United States)
- Frequency: 2 to 3 times/year
- Open access: Yes

Standard abbreviations
- ISO 4: Ufahamu

Indexing
- ISSN: 0041-5715
- LCCN: 2009223306
- OCLC no.: 471078199

Links
- Journal homepage

Ufahamu: A Journal of African Studies is a graduate-student run, peer-reviewed academic journal published at the University of California, Los Angeles (UCLA). It was established by the UCLA African Activist Association in 1970 and named after the Swahili word for comprehension, understanding, or being. The journal is published three times a year and is available from the University of California's eScholarship website. It describes itself as the "oldest student-run journal of Africanist scholarship."

Ufahamu is published in English, with occasional poetry or articles in African and European languages. It is indexed in the MLA International Bibliography, Africa-Wide Information, and Historical Abstracts.

== Origin and purpose ==
Ufahamu was conceived in 1969 by a group of graduate students active in UCLA's African Activist Association and African Studies Center, after a black-white confrontation at the 1969 African Studies Association in Montreal, where the black caucus critiqued African studies scholars and journals for being "overwhelmingly white and male." The journal was established with an "activist orientation" to act "as a pressure group with regard to the sociopolitical problems relating to Africa," and to provide a forum for new perspectives on Africa and sharp discussion.

Since its founding, the journal served as a platform for scholars across the diaspora, giving voice to "Africans and Afro-Americans, students, non-academics and academics."

== Topics ==
Ufahamu publishes writing aimed at both general readers and scholars, and publishes material "supportive of the African revolution", about Africa and the African diaspora. This has included articles about African history, politics, economics, sociology, anthropology, law, planning and development, and literature. It also publishes work on racism, inequality, and language use, such as the use of "coloured" in the South African context.

It has published analyses of "crucial influences" in the study of postcolonial Africa and reviews of modern African art by African critics, drawing favorable comparisons with Wole Soyinka's journal Transition.

== Editors ==
The journal was initially edited by seven graduate students: Robert Cummings, Salih El Arifi, Sondra Hale, Adolfo Mascarenhas, Reynee Pouissant, Joy Stewart, and Allen Thurm. By the third volume in 1973, it had an editor-in-chief. Editors such as Es'kia Mphahlele tried to use the journal to "actualise African modernity" and encourage the emergence of modern African literature.

== Impact ==
The journal published the first articles of some of the most cited scholars in African studies, including Walter Rodney, whose essays became the book How Europe Underdeveloped Africa, John Thornton, and Sondra Hale.

Influential articles from Ufahamu include Judith Van Allen's 1975 essay on the Igbo Women's War of 1929, Sondra Hale on the controversy over genital cutting, Edward Alpers on African economic history and underdevelopment, Christopher Ehret on African history, and articles on the limitations of universal literary critiera, Garveyism, and trance in Nigerian theater.

The journal has been described by scholars as an important part of the "black radical tradition," and is credited for introducing important terms in African studies, such as Ali Mazrui's concept of "Afrabia" and for contributing to the nature and direction of African studies.

== Controversy ==
The journal was sometimes banned as a "militant African activist" journal. The apartheid South African government banned the spring 1982 edition of the journal for publishing papers from a recent conference of the African Activist Association, which criticized the government and was titled "From Apartheid and Imperialism to the Total Liberation of Southern Africa."
