= Said Sheikh Samatar =

Somali scholar

- سعيد الشيخ سمتر
- Born: Saciid Sheekh Samatar; 1943; Ogaden, Ethiopia
- Died: 24 February 2015 (aged 71–72); Newark, New Jersey, United States
- Education: Goshen College (1973); Northwestern University (1979)
- Occupations: Scholar, writer
- Spouse: Lydia Samatar
- Children: Sofia Samatar, Delmar Samatar
- Writing career
- Notable works: Oral poetry and Somali nationalism (1982); Somalia: Nation in Search of a State (1987)

Said Sheikh Samatar (Somali: Siciid Sheekh Samatar, Arabic: سعيد الشيخ سمتر; 1943 – 24 February 2015) was a Somali scholar and writer.

== Biography ==
=== Early years ===
Said was born in 1943 in the Ogaden in Ethiopia to Faduma and Sheikh Samatar. He came from a large family consisting of fourteen people, including his father's second wife. Samatar spent his early years in a nomadic environment, where he writes that "seasons of plenty" with "fragrant flowers blooming all over the fallowed fields, abundant milk and meat" alternated with the "perennial threat of starvation during droughts, marauding gangs of enemy clans bent on murder and mayhem, stripping you of your livestock, the ever-present danger of ravenous predators."

In 1958, Said's father, who had been working for the government as an Islamic magistrate since 1948, sent for him to begin schooling. Samatar subsequently moved to the town of Qalaafo, transitioning from nomadic life to urban life. Samatar received education at a Christian Missionary school run by Protestants. During 1963, a Somali revolt against the Ethiopia Empire broke out and Qalaafo was bombarded during a reprisal carried out by the Ethiopian Imperial Army, resulting in the destruction of much of the property own by Samatar's family. In the attack his brother was shot and crippled by the Ethiopians, resulting in Samatar and his brothers becoming refugees in the Somali Republic.

=== Adulthood ===
In 1970, Samatar began working at the National Teaching College in Somalia alongside several American librarians. There, an American friend suggested that he continue his education at a university in the United States.

Coming to the U.S. on a scholarship, Samatar commenced studies at Goshen College in Goshen, Indiana. He attended early morning and night classes, while working during the day as a welder to support his wife, who at the time was pregnant with their two children. Samatar graduated from Goshen College in 1973 with a degree in history and literature. He followed that with a Master's degree in Northeast African history, and received a graduate certificate in African studies. In 1979, he obtained a doctorate in African history from Northwestern University in Evanston, Illinois. Soon after, a job offer arrived from Eastern Kentucky University in Richmond, Kentucky, where Samatar taught from 1979 to 1981. In July 1981, he accepted a post at Rutgers University in Newark, New Jersey.

His daughter is award-winning author Sofia Samatar.

On 24 February 2015, Said Sheikh Samatar died while undergoing treatment for an unspecified illness in Newark. He was survived by his wife Lydia, son Delmar, daughter Sofia, and four grandchildren. Somali expatriates around the world sent their condolences to the late scholar's family.

== Career ==
Samatar authored a number of books, including a series on Somalia. In addition, he wrote a variety of articles, scholarly papers and book reviews. Samatar was a member of the executive committee of the Somali Studies International Association since 1979, and served as a managing editor of the Horn of Africa journal. He was also a member of the International Advisory Board of Bildhaan: An International Journal of Somali Studies, published by Macalester College. Additionally, he was a consultant to The Somali Experience project and was a member of the African Studies Association. He oversaw Somali-related programming on Voice of America.

In 1995, along with Ismail Ali Ismail, Samatar took part in an international symposium in Asmara, Eritrea for the writing of the Constitution of Eritrea.

Samatar was a regular fixture in the popular media. In 1992, as part of the Social Science Research Council team's reassessment of the "Teaching and Study of the Humanities in Africa," he went to Somalia as a consultant and interpreter for the ABC news program Nightline with the American journalist Ted Koppel. Beginning in 1983, Samatar appeared on BBC shows for interviews regarding Northeast Africa, and discussed Somalia on NBC, ABC, CBS, CNN International, as well as PBS' The NewsHour with Jim Lehrer and Canadian Broadcasting Corporation's radio and television news programs. Samatar has been cited in Time, Newsweek, U.S. News & World Report, The New York Times and The Washington Post.

== Works ==
=== Books ===
- Oral poetry and Somali nationalism: the case of Sayyid Mahammad 'Abdille Hasan. Cambridge University Press, 1982. ISBN 0-521-23833-1
- Somalia: nation in search of a State (co-author: Laitin, David D.). Westview Press, 1987
- Somalia: a nation in turmoil. Minority Rights Group, 1991
- (Ed.) In the shadow of conquest: Islam in colonial Northeast Africa. Red Sea Press, 1992
- In Samatar '92: chapter 3: Shaykh Uways Muhammad of Baraawe, 1847-1909: Mystic Reformer in East Africa

=== Articles ===
- "Oral poetry and political dissent in Somali society : the Hurgumo series", Ufahamu: A Journal of African Studies, 1989
- "How to Run an SNM Gauntlet", Horn of Africa, 13, Nos. 1–2, April–June 1990, pp. 78–87.
- "The Search for Political Accountability in African Governance: The Somali Case"., African Governance in the 1990s (Atlanta: The Carter Center, 1990), pp. 165–168.
- "How to Save Somalia", Washington Post, 1 December 1992, pg. A19.
- "The Politics of Poetry", Africa Report (September/October 1993), pp. 16–17.
- "Remembering B.W. Andrzejewski: Poland's Somali Genius", 1998
- "'Sarbeeb' : the art of oblique communication in Somali culture", Wardheernews Online
- "Unhappy masses and the challenge of political Islam in the Horn of Africa", Horn of Africa, 2002
- "An Open Letter to Uncle Sam: America, Pray Leave Somalia to Its Own Devices", Journal of Contemporary African Studies, July 2010, Vol. 28, Issue 3, pp. 313–323.

== See also ==
- Somali Studies
