= Mohamed Diriye Abdullahi =

Somali-Canadian linguist

Mohamed Diriye Abdullahi محمد ديري عبد الله
- Born: Mohamed Diriiyee Abdullahi; 1958 (age 67–68); Somalia
- Citizenship: Somali-Canadian
- Education: Université de Montréal; University of Franche-Comté
- Occupations: Linguist, scholar, writer
- Writing career
- Notable work: Culture and Customs of Somalia

Mohamed Diriye Abdullahi (Somali: Maxamed Diriye Abdullahi, Arabic: محمد ديري عبد الله; born 1958) is a Somali-Canadian scholar, linguist, writer, translator and professor.

== Biography ==
Formerly a journalist in his native Somalia, Abdullahi emigrated to Canada, where he earned a Master's degree and a Ph.D. in linguistics from the Université de Montréal in Montreal, Quebec. He also earned a higher diploma in the instruction of French as a second language at the Université de Franche-comté in Besançon, France.

Abdullahi is fluent in Somali, Arabic, English and French. His research interests include the study of the Afro-Asiatic languages in general (particularly its Cushitic branch), as well as Somali history and culture.

He has also written numerous books, notably Culture and Customs of Somalia published by Greenwood Publishing Group in 2001, where he addresses the obscure origins of the Somali people, among other topics.

Abdullahi currently teaches linguistics at the Université de Montréal. He also works as a freelance translator and language consultant.

== Bibliography ==
=== Major publications ===
- Abdullahi, Mohamed Diriye (2001). Culture and Customs of Somalia. Greenwood Publishing Group. ISBN 9780313313332.
- Abdullahi, Mohamed Diriye (1996). Parlons somali (French ed.). L'Harmattan. ISBN 9782738448989.
- Abdullahi, Mohamed Diriye (1995). Fiasco in Somalia: US-UN intervention. Africa Institute of South Africa. ISBN 9780798301251.

=== Manuscripts and projects ===
- Denis Sinor, ed. (August 1954). "Is Somali a tone-language". Proceedings of the Twenty-Third International Congress of Orientalists. Cambridge: London Royal Asiatic Society: 367–368.
- The Evolution and Meaning of the Cardinal Directions in Somali—Paper showing how the four words for the cardinal directions in the Somali language evolved into their present forms.
- The Diachronic Development of the Progressive in Somali—Paper discussing the formation of the progressive tense in the Somali language.

=== Dissertation ===
- Abdullahi, Mohamed Diriye (2010). Le Somali, Dialectes Et Histoire: Examination, analysis and classification of linguistic varieties spoken in Somalia and collectively dubbed "Somali". Editions universitaires europeennes EUE. p. 324. ISBN 9786131520594.

== See also ==
- Somali Studies
