= Ahmed Samatar =

Somali writer and professor (born 1952)

Ahmed Ismail Samatar
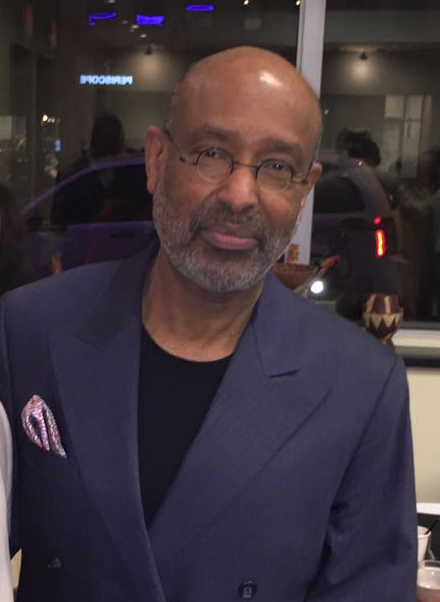
- Born: 1952 (age 73–74); Gabiley, British Somaliland (now Somaliland)
- Citizenship: Somalilander, American
- Education: University of Wisconsin–La Crosse; University of Denver
- Occupations: Writer, professor, scholar
- Spouse: divorced
- Relatives: Abdi Ismail Samatar
- Political party: Hillaac

Ahmed Ismail Samatar (Somali: Axmed Ismaaciil Samatar, Arabic: أحمد إسماعيل سمتر) is a Somali writer, professor and former dean of the Institute for Global Citizenship at Macalester College. He is the editor of Bildhaan: An International Journal of Somali Studies, and brother of Abdi Ismail Samatar, chair of the geography department at the University of Minnesota. Samatar joined the Peace, Unity, and Development Party, the ruling party of the self-declared Republic of Somaliland in June 2016. Samatar was widely touted as a possible candidate for Somaliland's 2022 presidential elections.

== Biography ==
Ahmed Ismail Samatar was born and raised in the Gabiley District, situated in Somaliland. He is the brother of scholar and politician Abdi Ismail Samatar. His father Ismail Samatar Mohamed (Dheere) was a businessman and traditional elder, and his mother Haliimo Abdilaahi Kahin is the sister of the late coffee tycoon Mohamed Abdillahi Ogsadey.

Samatar began his early traditional Islamic schooling (mal'amad qur'an) while he was young. His first Qur'an teacher was Ma'alin Hassan Fahiye. In 1952, he was the first student enrolled in the first Gabiley Primary/intermediate school, where he finished his lower education. His middle and high schools were in Amoud Intermediate and Agricultural secondary school.

After finishing high school, Samatar moved to Mogadishu, the capital city of the Somalia, where he was accepted as a radio broadcaster at Radio Mogadishu in the mid 60s. In the late 60s, Ahmed filled a vacancy at the BBC African service, although was still young. He served as a BBC broadcaster till the mid 70s when he made up his mind to get a higher education. He later moved from London to the United States.

Samatar has lectured at many universities and colleges, including Cornell, Harvard, Iowa, London School of Economics and Political Science, Somali National University, Toronto University, University of Amsterdam, York University, University of Otago, University of Hargeisa and Wellesley College. His expertise is in the areas of global political economy, political and social thought, and Somali affairs. He is the author/editor of five books and over thirty articles.

Additionally, Samatar is the founding editor-in-chief of Bildhaan, one of the international journals of Somali Studies. He is also the editor of eighteen volumes of Macalester International, a publication of undergraduate education and internationalism.

A Fulbright Fellow, Samatar has been awarded grants by the Ford Foundation, the Mellon Foundation, the United States Institute of Peace, the Heinrich Böll Foundation and the St. Paul Foundation.

His current research is on two tracks: a collaborative two volumes on leadership and the Somali experience; and globalization and the rise of Islamic consciousness. Since 1994, Samatar has been teaching at Macalester College, where he is the James Wallace Professor and retired Dean of the Institute for Global Citizenship.

In mid-2012, Samatar ran for political office as one of the potential candidates in Somalia's 2012 presidential elections.

== Bibliography ==
Year	Title
1988	Socialist Somalia: Rhetoric and Reality
1995	Somalia: State Collapse, Multilateral Intervention, and Strategies for Political Reconstruction
1998	Nature, People, and Globalization
2002	The African state: reconsiderations
2003	Prometheus's Bequest: Technology and Change

== Educational-background ==
- B.A. magna cum laude, University of Wisconsin–La Crosse, 1978
- M.A., University of Denver, 1981
- PhD, University of Denver, 1984

== See also ==
- Somali Studies
- Macalester College
