= Martin Orwin =

British linguist, scholar and writer

- Born: 1963 (age 62–63); England
- Education: School of Oriental and African Studies
- Occupations: linguist, scholar, writer

Martin Orwin (born 1963) is a British linguist, scholar and writer, specializing in the languages and cultures of the Horn of Africa.

== Biography ==
Orwin studied Arabic and Amharic and has a PhD in the phonology of the Somali language. Since 1992, he has been a lecturer in Somali and Amharic at the School of Oriental and African Studies (SOAS) in London, England, where he teaches both Afro-Asiatic languages. Since 2020, he also teaches both Somali language and Somali literature at the Università degli Studi di Napoli "L'Orientale" (Naples, Italy). He has also published articles on Somali language and poetry and has conducted field research in the Horn of Africa.

Orwin's ongoing research interests include language use in poetry, particularly in the metrics of Somali verse. In addition, he has translated a number of Somali poems, two of which were published in the Modern Poetry in Translation (No.17 Mother Tongues Special Edition 2001) compendium.

Orwin has worked closely with a number of Somali poets, including Gaarriye and Hadraawi, and is very involved with the Poetry Translation Centre based in London.

He is also the author of Colloquial Somali, a popular book & CD instruction course on the Somali language.

Additionally, Orwin is a member of the International Advisory Board of Bildhaan: An International Journal of Somali Studies, published by Macalester College.

== Major works ==
- Orwin, Martin, Colloquial Somali: A Complete Language Course, (Routledge: 1995). ISBN 0-415-45269-4 ISBN 978-0415452694
- Orwin, Martin and Awde, N and Xaaji, Cabdulqaadir, Somali-English, English-Somali Dictionary and Phrasebook, (Hippocrene Books: 1999). ISBN 0-7818-0621-6 ISBN 978-0781806213

== See also ==
- Somali Studies
- Ethiopian Studies
