= Sada Mire =

Swedish-Somali archaeologist and historian

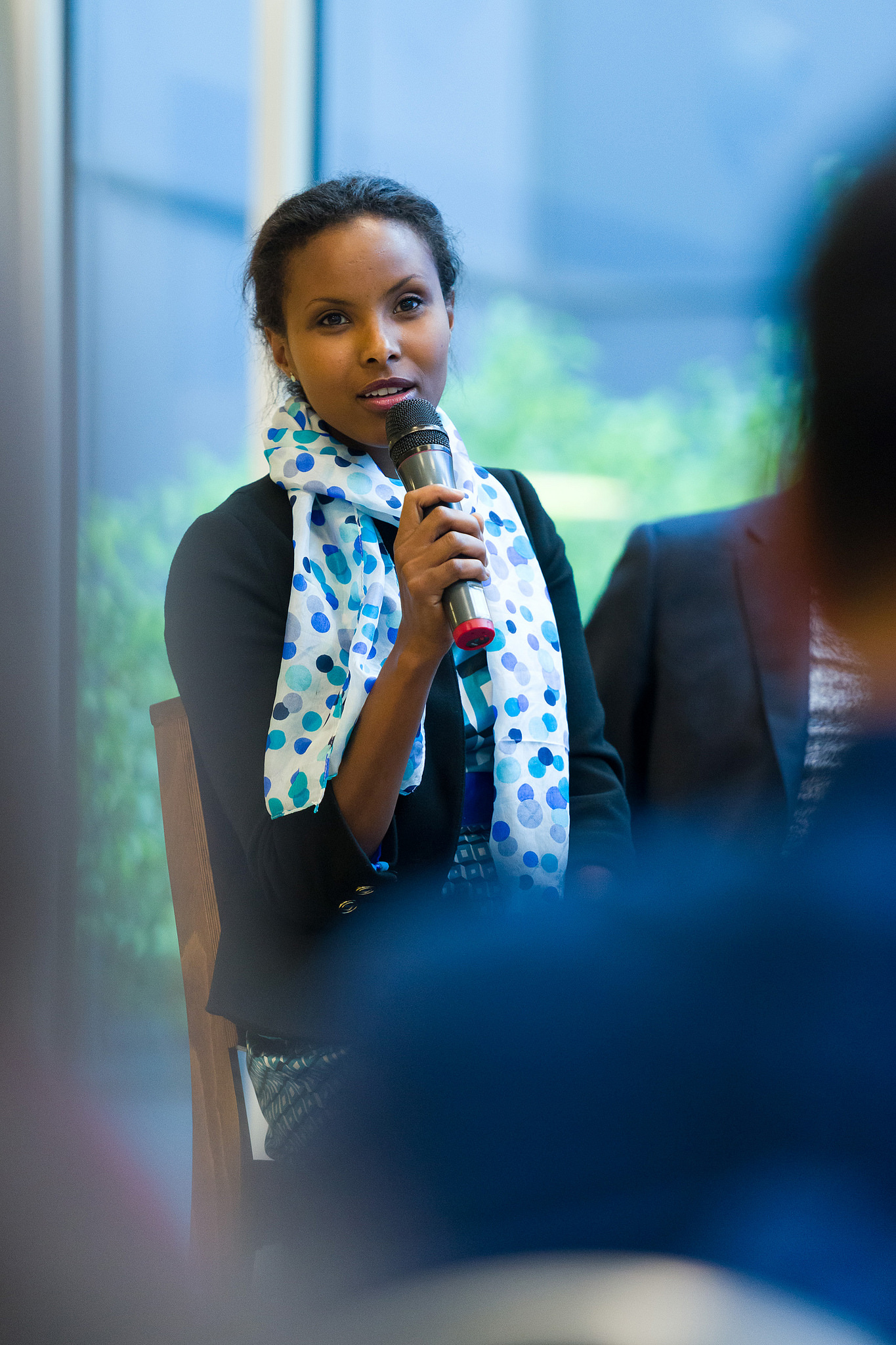
- Born: 1976 (age 49–50); Hargeisa, Somali Democratic Republic (now Somaliland)
- Education: Lund University; SOAS, University of London (BA); University College London (MA, PhD)
- Employer: University College London
- Organization: Horn Heritage Organization
- Awards: 2011 Sweden Supertalent Awards
- Website: www.sadamire.com

Sada Mire (born July 1976) (Somali: Sacda Mire, Arabic: سعدة ميرة) is a Swedish-Somali archaeologist, and public intellectual known for her work on the archaeology and heritage of the Horn of Africa. She is Associate Professor of Heritage Studies at the University College London Institute of Archaeology and founder of the [Horn Heritage Foundation], a non-profit organization dedicated to preserving cultural heritage in the region.

== Scholarship and public engagement ==
Mire’s research focuses on indigenous religious traditions, ritual landscapes and heritage management in the Horn of Africa. She is noted for a “knowledge-centred approach” to heritage, which emphasises skills, practices and memories as well as monuments and objects. Her book Divine Fertility: The Continuity in Transformation of an Ideology of Sacred Kinship in Northeast Africa (2020)develops what she calls the Archaeology of Peace, exploring how concepts of peace and fertility underpin long-term institutions and state formation in the region.

Alongside academic publications, Mire has contributed to public debates on culture and conflict through essays, interviews and lectures, including a 2014 TEDx talk and a British Academy Global Perspectives lecture on heritage in a divided world. She has appeared in documentaries for CNN, PBS and other broadcasters, and in 2017 was named one of 30 international thinkers and writers highlighted by the Hay Festival of Literature and the Arts.

== Education work ==
In order to educate her people on the cultural heritage of their country, to continue with the archaeological explorations and get UNESCO World Heritage Sites status for some of the rock art sites she has discovered, Mire has established the "Horn Heritage", a non-profit organization to fund her work. She was also involved in establishing Somalia’s Department of Tourism and Archaeology. Through her charity Horn Heritage and with partners, Mire initiated and implemented digital 3D and virtual reality (VR) projects for Somali heritage, so that anybody anywhere could access her rock art work. In 2006, Mire created the first website dedicated to Somali Heritage and Archaeology.

Mire has run national and international media campaigns to fight the looting and destruction of Somali archeological sites. One of her direct messages to the Somali public warning against looting was broadcast by BBC Somali.

Mire's designed a MOOC (Massive online open course) on 'Heritage under Threat', (2016 - 2020). This video based course introduced learners to the topic of heritage under threat. The course was written and presented by Mire.

== Theoretical contribution to heritage and archaeology ==
In her 2011 NewScientist interview article titled 'We need culture in times of war', Mire argued "Cultural heritage, including archeological knowledge, is a basic human need". Her work bridges archaeology and anthropology of the Horn of Africa in investigating the pre-Islamic and pre-Christian indigenous religions and traditions of the Horn of Africa.

Mire discussed the misuse of archaeology for politics and intentional destruction of heritage sites by ideological groups for example India. For her geographical area of fieldwork, she has argued that archaeologists need to move away from the nation as this is a new construct and study the continuity of influence across different indigenous peoples in the horn of Africa, proposing regional perspective on the archaeology of the Horn of Africa.

Mire is considered to have pioneered the study of indigenous heritage management systems in Africa with her article "Preserving knowledge, not objects: a Somali perspective for Archaeological Research and Heritage Management" (African Archaeological Review, 2007). She addressed the looting and destruction of Somalia's heritage after the start of the Somali civil war. She advanced a theoretical approach she terms "the Knowledge-Centered Approach" arguing that objects and monuments are not necessarily important but knowledge, skill and memory as practiced and symbolized in the landscapes. Her approaches have been discussed by other scholars in the application of locally appropriate theoretical frameworks.

=== Archaeology of Peace ===
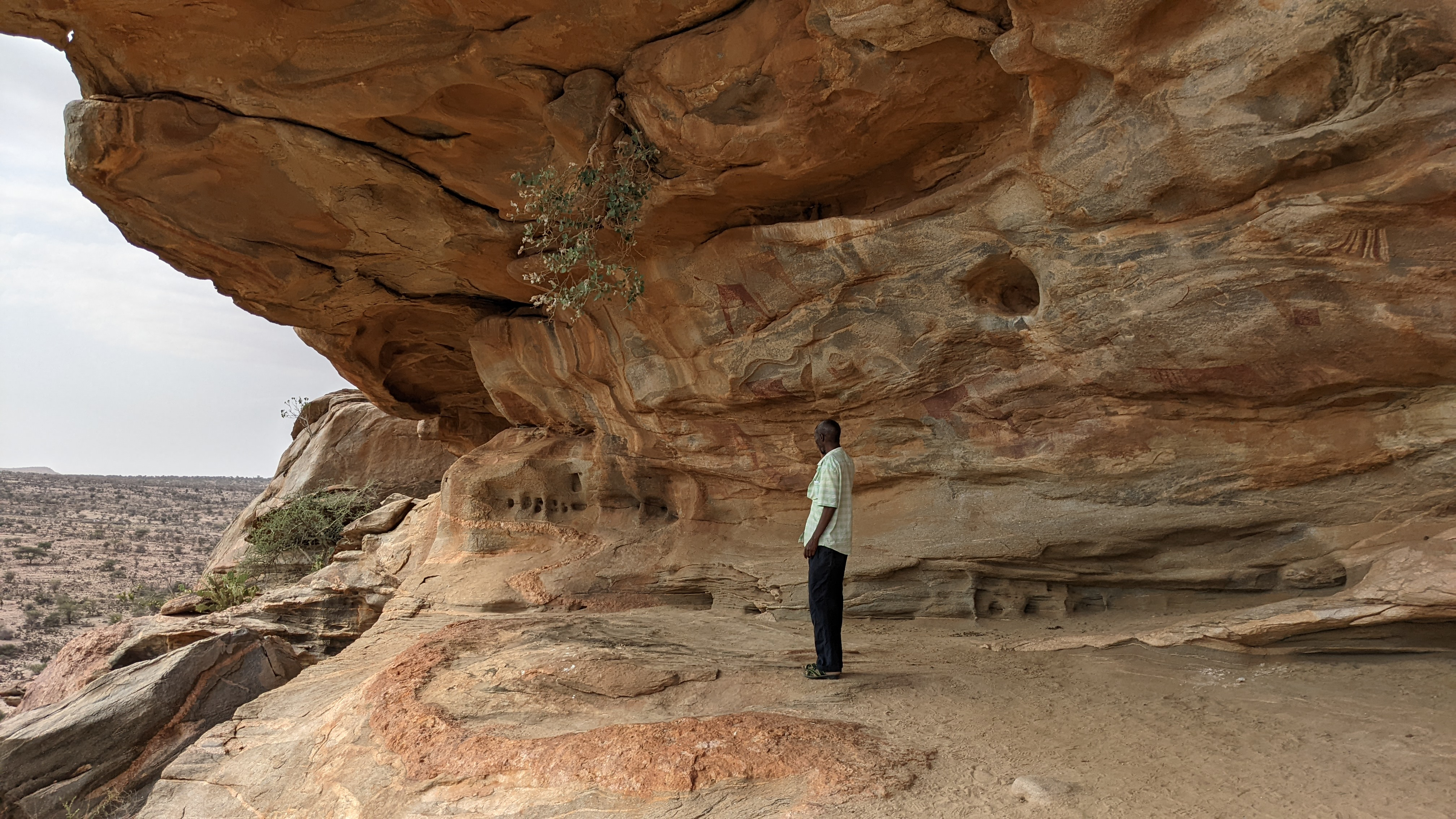
Laas Geel Cave with Rock Art and Local Guide

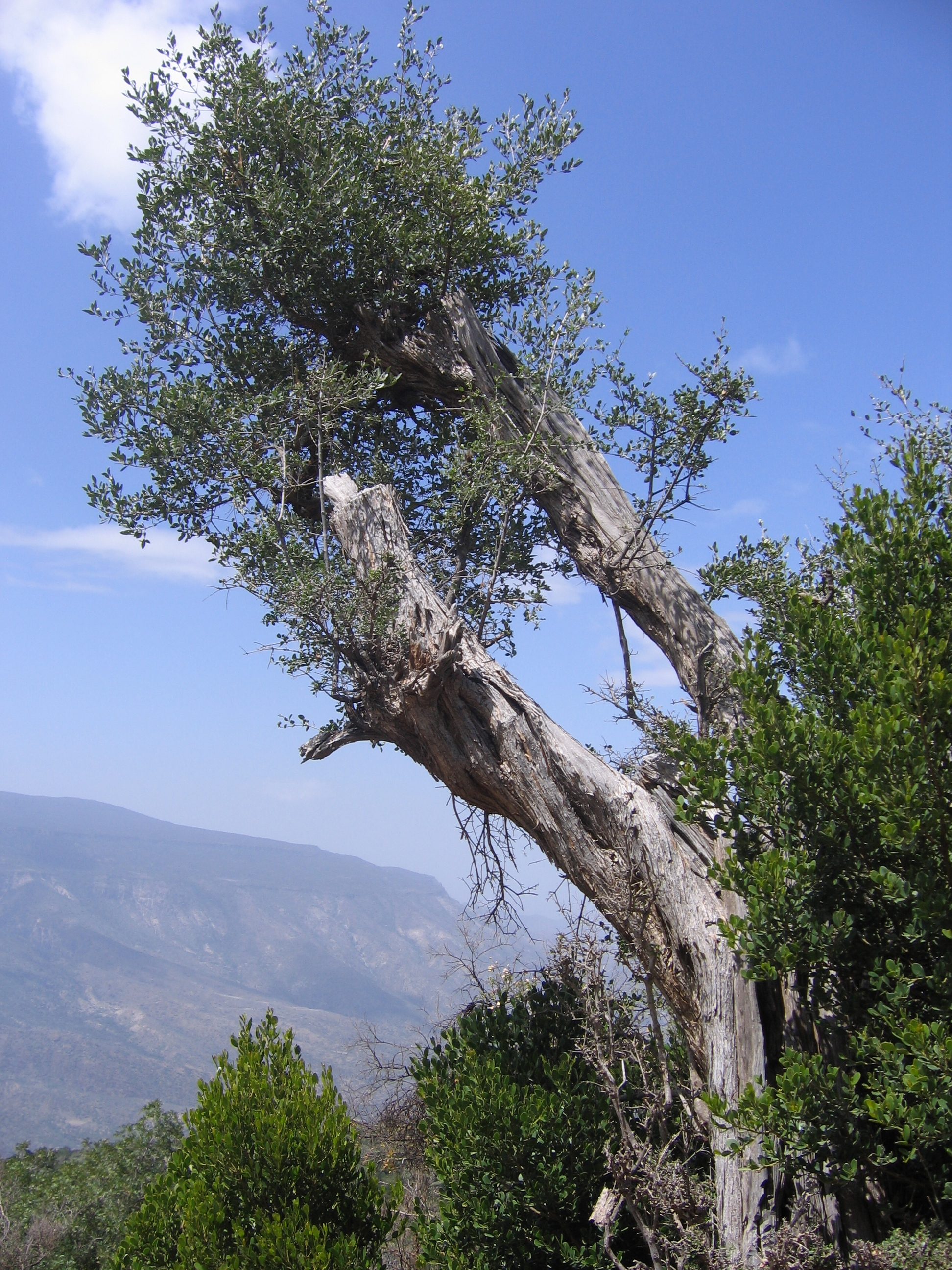
Sacred olive tree at Daalo sacred olive forest

Mire uses the concept of the Archaeology of Peace, as first explored in her book Divine Fertility (2020). The concept grows out of her doctoral research, which she started in 2006 and finished 2009, and focuses on how peace, cohesion, and shared institutions can be understood archaeologically in the Horn of Africa.

Mire use an interdisciplinary approach study indigenous ideology, traditional laws, governance and thought in Northeast Africa. Mire found that ancient sites, artefacts and landscapes continue to impact on social cohesion, diversity and peace making through practices and materiality. Her research started with an exploration of pre-Christian and pre-Islamic Northeast Africa’s regional beliefs and practices. The book argued that peace is a prerequisite for gaining sacred fertility, which is important for the growth of humans, animals and crops and which has led to the major state formation that took place in this region in the past 3000 years. Mire argues that there is an ideology of peace within the Horn of Africa and identifies the indigenous concept of peace, nagi/nagaa, which continues in transformation through practices, religions and rituals.

==== Origins and aims ====
Mire's development of the Archaeology of Peace is rooted in her experience of genocide, persecution and war in Somalia and her interest in how cultural heritage can “glue people together” in times of conflict. In her 2018 Hague Talk, “You want world peace? Revise the History Books!”, she called for revising dominant historical narratives to reveal deep, shared histories that cut across Christian–Muslim and other divides in the Horn of Africa. The Archaeology of Peace proposes an approach that prioritises long-term institutions—such as traditional law, religion and governance—that have historically bound communities together rather than focusing primarily on conflict.

==== Divine Fertility and key concepts ====
In Divine Fertility: The Continuity in Transformation of an Ideology of Sacred Kinship in Northeast Africa, Mire uses an interdisciplinary approach (archaeology, anthropology, historical texts and linguistics) to analyse sacred landscapes, rituals and material culture in Northeast Africa. The book identifies an indigenous concept of peace, Nagi/Nagaa, which she argues remains active among peoples of the Horn of Africa and is a prerequisite for sacred fertility in humans, animals and crops. Mire links this peace concept to ideologies of sacred kinship and divine fertility and suggests it underpinned major state formations in the region. She also identifies spaces of consensus and ritual peace-making—such as sacred enclosures, trees, springs and mountains—and outlines a “Ritual Set” as a framework for studying the Archaeology of Peace over the past three millennia.

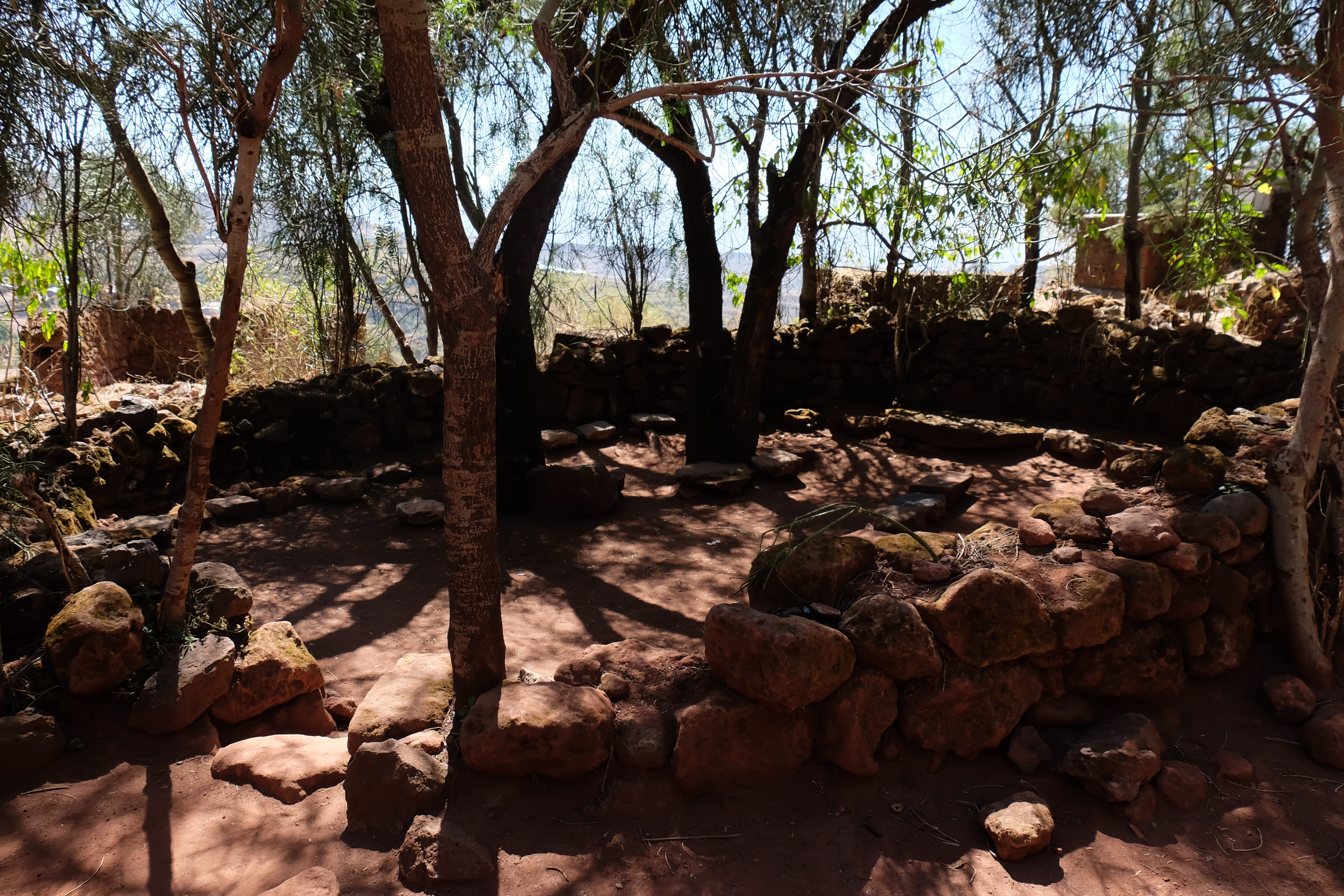
Ritual enclosure of Lalibela adjacent to one of the Lalibela rock hewn churches

Methodology and scope

The Archaeology of Peace is pursued through multidisciplinary and interdisciplinary methods that examine ideology, governance, traditional law and thought in relation to ancient sites, artefacts and landscapes. Mire argues that practices, places and material culture reveal both social stratification and mechanisms of social cohesion, diversity and peace-making. Her work on sacred landscapes, stelae traditions and ancient Christian and medieval Muslim centres in Northeast Africa provides a theoretical and analytical framework for interpreting shared regional heritage as an indigenous Archaeology of Peace, rather than through narrow national or conflict-centred narratives.

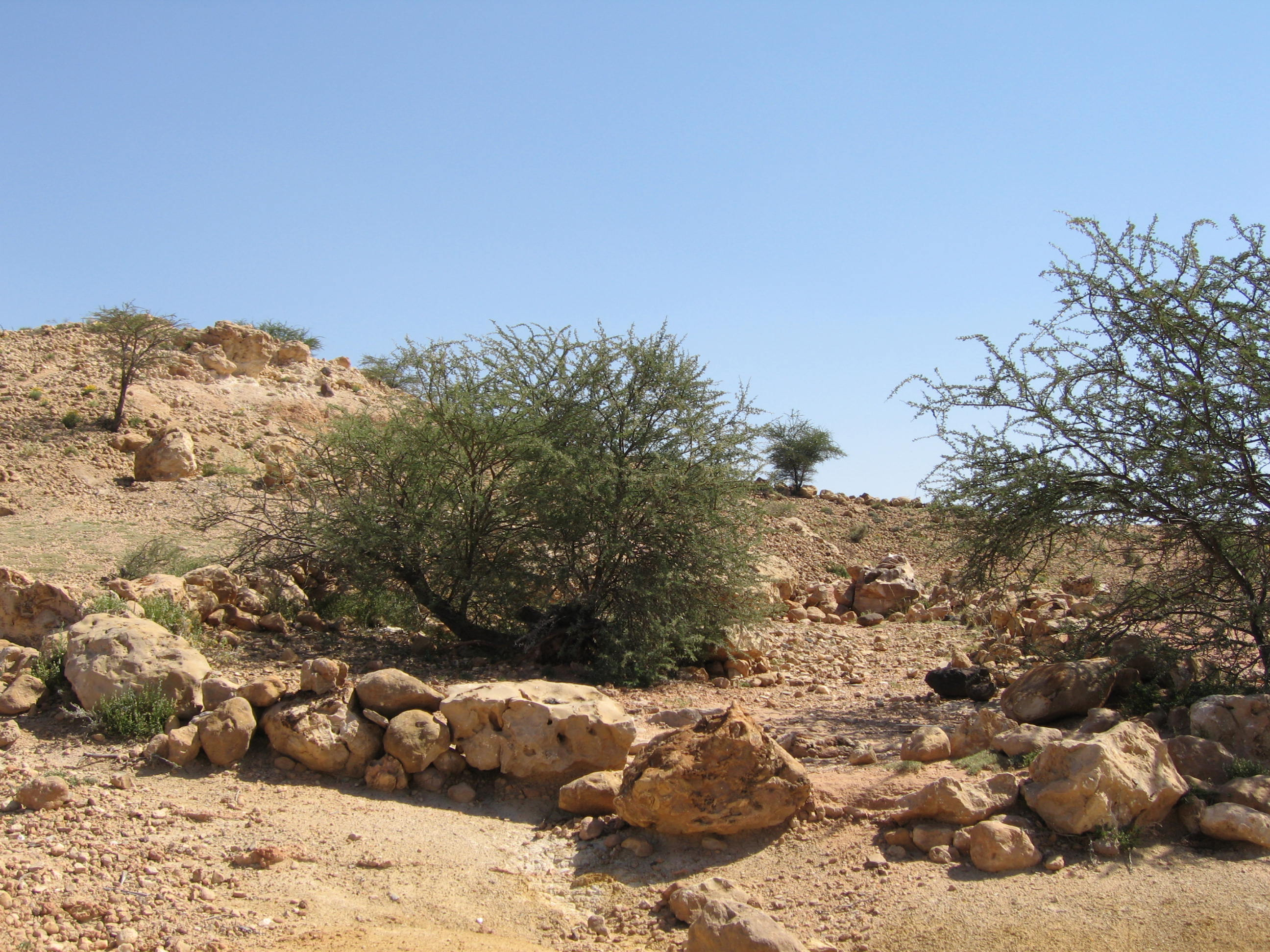
the sacred olive trees that surround Lalibela

==== Ongoing work and reception ====
Mire continues to develop this subfield through projects such as “War and Famine vs. Peace and Fertility”, which uses cultural heritage and archaeology to address war and famine in the Horn of Africa by focusing on cultural notions of peace- and fertility-making. In her 2020 British Academy Global Perspectives lecture, she related this work to contemporary global divisions, arguing that understanding “deep history” can help societies navigate current crises in powerful democracies and elsewhere. Interviews and profiles in venues such as New Scientist and The Hague's city business agency have highlighted her argument that cultural heritage and archaeological knowledge are a basic human need and central to modern peacebuilding efforts.

== Other activities ==
In 2011, Mire proposed to UNESCO the digital preservation of Somali potential World Heritage. She was a speaker of the first UNESCO Debate organized by UNESCO Netherlands at the RMO, September 2016. Mire spoke along Dutch philosopher Stephan Sanders.

Mire has spoken on several BBC Radio programs including BBC World Service Forum panel on the Aftermath of war and marriage.

She was a speaker at the Europe Lecture and an "eminent" respondent to UNESCO Director General Irina Bokova, June 2016.

In September 2018, Mire participated to Hague Talks "How can we Invest in Sustainable Peace?"

Mire was a speaker at the Swedish National Heritage Board and on BBC World Service radio documentary "Stories on the Rocks", December 2018.

== Filmography ==
CNN made a feature documentary on the story of Mire and her twin sister Sohur. The CNN African Voices Program featured the sisters in their professional environment, as an archeologist and a medical doctor giving back to their community and working in their homeland, Somalia. The documentary discusses how they fled the Somali civil war and started new lives in Sweden as child refugees.

For National Geographic's Don't Tell my Mother I'm in Somalia episode, presenter Diego Buñuel met up with Mire in her office in Hargeisa and with her visited some of the landmarks of Somaliland.

Brazil's Futura (TV Channel) aired in 2014 a documentary titled Sada and Somaliland, following her progress as the country's only Somali archeologist.

Mire was one of the experts featuring in the 2017 PBS series Africa's Great Civilizations, presented by Professor Henry Louis Gates Jr.

Mire is the presenter and screenwriter of the MOOC titled Heritage under Threat.

== Selected publications ==
=== Articles ===
- "Somali Shield, Gaashaan". Hazina. 2006.
- "The Transition to Farming in Eastern Africa: New Faunal and Dating Evidence from Wadh Lang’o and Usenge, Kenya". Antiquity. 2007.
- "Preserving Knowledge, not Objects: A Somali Perspective for Heritage Management and Archaeological Research". African Archaeological Review. 2007.
- "The Discovery of Dhambalin Rock Art Site, Somaliland". African Archaeological Review. 2008.
- "The Knowledge-Centred Approach to the Somali Cultural Emergency and heritage development assistance in Somaliland". African Archaeological Review. 2011.
- "Beautiful Somali buildings are rising up in a former war zone. It gives me hope". The Guardian. 2015.
- "Wagar, Fertility and Phallic Stelae: Cushitic Sky-God Belief and the Site of Saint Aw-Barkhadle in Somaliland". African Archaeological Review. 2015.
- "Mapping the Archaeology of Somaliland: Religion, Art, Script, Time, Urbanism, Trade and Empire". African Archaeological Review. 2015.
- "Tourism of Somalia. 2015".
- "‘The child that tiire doesn't give you, God won't give you either.’ The role of Rotheca myricoides in Somali fertility practices". In: Anthropology & Medicine, 2016, 23: 3, p. 311-331.
- "The Role of Cultural Heritage in the Basic Needs of East African Pastoralists". African Study Monographs 53(Supplementary Issue): 147-157.
- "Black history has much to reveal about our ancestors – and ourselves". The Guardian. 2018.
