= Ali A. Abdi =

Somali-Canadian sociologist

- Born: July 5, 1955 (age 71)
- Education: Concordia University & McGill University
- Writing career
- Notable works: Education in Somalia: History, destruction and calls for reconstruction (1998); Education and the politics of difference: Canadian perspectives (2013) with Ratna Ghosh; Decolonizing philosophies of education (2011)

Ali A. Abdi is a Somali-Canadian sociologist and educationist. Currently, he is a professor of social development education in the Department of Educational Studies at the University of British Columbia in Vancouver, Canada, where he previously served as head of department. Before that, he was a professor of International Education and International Development at the University of Alberta in Edmonton, Alberta, Canada, where he also served as the founding co-director of the Centre for Global Citizenship Education and Research (CGCER). He is past president of the Comparative and International Education Society of Canada (CIESC). In addition, he is the founding editor/co-editor of the peer-reviewed online publications Journal of Contemporary Issues in Education and Cultural and Pedagogical Inquiry.

== Career ==
Ali received his B.A. in sociology from the Concordia University in Montreal, where he also pursued and achieved a M.A. in political science with concentration on public policy. He received his Ph.D. in international development education from McGill University. Since then Ali has worked on international research projects in Somalia, Kenya, South Africa, Senegal, and Zambia as a researcher, program director or project contributor. He has written - with different extensity - on Somali politics, Somali education and general education and development education on the wider Africa context, as well as other social and cultural issues pertinent to the continent's social wellbeing and knowledge decolonization contexts.

== Education ==
- B.A. (cum laude) sociology, Concordia University, Montreal
- M.A. political science, Concordia University, Montreal
- Ph.D. international development education, McGill University, Montreal

== Works ==
=== Books (selection) ===
Authored

- Culture, education and development in South Africa: Historical and contemporary perspectives. Westport, Conn. & London: Bergin & Garvey. 232 pages. (2002)
- Education and the politics of difference: Select Canadian perspectives. Toronto: Canadian Scholars' Press. 200 pages. (2013, 2nd edition), with Ratna Ghosh.
- Citizenship education and social development in Zambia. Charlotte, NC: Information Age Publishing. 170 pages. (2010), with Edward Shizha and Lee Ellis.

Edited (Selection)

- Issues in African education: sociological perspectives. New York: Palgrave Macmillan. 320 pages. (2005) with Ailie Cleghorn.
- African Education and globalization: critical perspectives. Lanham, MD: Rowman & Littlefield. 222 pages. (2006) With Korbla Puplampu and George Dei.
- Educating for human rights and global citizenship. Albany, NY: SUNY Press. 256 pages. (2009) with Lynette Shultz.
- Education and social development: global issues and analyses. Rotterdam, Netherlands: Sense Publishers. 262 pages. (2008) with Shibao Guo
- Global perspectives on adult education. New York: Palgrave Macmillan. 284 pages. (2009) with Dip Kapoor.
- Decolonizing philosophies of education. 208 pages. (2012).

=== Journal and chapters articles (selection) ===
- Democratic development and prospects for citizenship education: theoretical perspectives on Sub-Saharan Africa. Interchange: A Quarterly Review of Education, 39(2), 151–166.
- Citizenship and its discontents: educating for political and economic development in Sub-Saharan Africa. In M. Peters, A. Britton & H. Blee (Eds.), Global Citizenship Education: Philosophy, Theory and Pedagogy. Rotterdam, Netherlands: Sense Publishers.
- Europe and African thought systems and philosophies of education: 're-culturing' the trans-temporal discourses. Cultural Studies, 22(2), 309–327.
- From 'education for all to education for none': Somalia in the careless global village. In A. Abdi & S. Guo (Eds.), Education and social development: global issues and analyses. Rotterdam, Holland: Sense Publishers.
- Oral societies and colonial experiences: Sub-Saharan Africa and the de facto power of the written word. International Education, 37(1), 42–59.
- Global multiculturalism: Africa and the recasting of the philosophical and epistemological plateaus. Diaspora, Indigenous and Minority Education, 1 (4), 1–14.
- Education and Zambia's democratic development: reconstituting 'something' from the predatory project of neo-liberal globalization. Alberta Journal of Educational Research, 53(3), 287–301.
- Eurocentric discourses and African philosophies and epistemologies of education: counter-hegemonic responses and analyses. International Education, 36(1), 15–31.
- Culture of education, social development and globalization: historical and current analyses of Africa. In A. Abdi, K.P. Puplampu & G.J.S. Dei (Eds.), African Education and globalization: critical perspectives. Lanham, MD: Rowman & Littlefield.
- Apartheid and education in South Africa: select analyses. Western Journal of Black Studies, 27(2), 89–97.
- Reconstructing the Somali state: the promise (and possible pitfalls) of federalism. Horn of Africa Journal, XXI(I), 20–29.
- Searching for development education in Africa: select perspectives on Somalia, South Africa and Nigeria. International Education Journal, 4(3) 192–200.
- Postcolonial education in South Africa: Problems and prospects for multicultural development. Journal of Postcolonial Education. 1(1), 9-26.
- Identity in the philosophies of Dewey and Freire: Select analyses. Journal of Educational Thought 35(2), 181–200.

=== Journals ===
- Founding Editor: Journal of Contemporary Issues in Education
- Co-founding Editor: Cultural and Pedagogical Inquiry
