= Abdi Kusow =

Somalian sociologist

Abdi Mohamed Kusow
- عبدي محمد كوسو
- Born: Cabdi Maxamed Kuusoow; Baidoa, Somalia
- Education: Michigan State University; University of Michigan; Wayne State University
- Occupations: scholar, writer

Abdi Mohamed Kusow (Somali: Cabdi Maxamed Kuusoow, Arabic: عبدي محمد كوسو) is a Somali scholar and writer.

He studied at Michigan State University, where he obtained a Bachelor of Arts in 1990. Kusow later earned a Master of Urban Planning (M.U.P.) from the University of Michigan Taubman College of Architecture and Urban Planning in 1992. He also holds a Ph. D. in sociology from Wayne State University (Dissertation, 1998 :"Migration and Identity process among Somali Immigrants in Canada").

Kusow is a professor of sociology at Iowa State in Ames, Iowa.

He is also a founder of the University of Southern Somalia.

== Bibliography ==
Kusow has published numerous books and scholarly articles over the years.

In late 2025, his h-index is 19.

Books

- 2004 Kusow, Abdi M. (ed.). 2004. Putting the Cart Before the Horse: Contested Nationalism and the Crisis of the Nation-State in Somalia, Trenton, NJ: The Red Sea Press.
- 2025 Kusow, Abid M. and R. Bjork, S. R. (ed.) From Mogadishu to Dixon: The Somali Diaspora in a Global Context (The Red Sea Press.)

Refereed articles/Book chapters

- 1993 Kusow, Abdi M. 1993. "The Role of Shelter in Generating Income Opportunities for Poor Women in the Third World." pp. 218–224 in Women, Shelter, and Development, edited by Hemalata Dandekar. Ann Arbor: Wehr Publications.
- 1994 Kusow, Abdi. "The Genesis of the Somali Civil War: A New Perspective." Northeast African Studies 1: 3-46.
- 1995 Kusow, Abdi M. "The Somali Origin: Myth or Reality."Pp.81-106 in The Invention of Somalia, edited by Ali. J. Ahmed. Trenton, NJ: Red Sea Press.
- 1995 Kusow, Abdi M. "Peace and Stability in Somalia." UFAHAMU: Journal of the African Activist Association 22: 25-40.
- 1997 Kusow, Abdi, Leon Wilson, and David Martin. 1997. "Determinants of Citizen Satisfaction with Police Performance: The Effects of Residential Location." Policing: An International Journal of Police Strategies and Management 4:655-664.
- 2001 Maines, David and Abdi Kusow. 2001 "Somali Migration to Canada and Resistance to Racialization." pp. 135–162 in The Faultline of Consciousness: A View of Interactionism in Sociology, New York: Aldine De Gruyter.
- 2001 Kusow, Abdi. 2001. "Stigma and Social Identities: The Process of Identity Work among Somali Immigrants in Canada." pp. 152–182 in Variations on the Theme of Somaliness, edited by M. S Lilius. Turku, Finland: Center for Continuing Education, Abo University Press.
- 2003 Kusow, Abdi M. 2003. "Beyond Indigenous Authenticity: Reflections on the Insider/Outsider Debate in Immigration Research," Symbolic Interaction 26: 591-599.
- 2004 Kusow, Abdi M. 2004. "Contested Narratives and the Crisis of National Identity: A Prolegomenon." pp. 1–14 in Putting the Cart Before the Horse: Contested Nationalism and the Crisis of the Nation-State in Somalia, edited by Abdi M. Kusow. Trenton, NJ: The Red Sea Press.
- 2004 Kusow, Abdi M. 2004. "Preface." Pp. xi-xvii in Putting the Cart Before the Horse: Contested Nationalism and the Crisis of the Nation-State in Somalia, edited by A M. Kusow. Trenton, NJ: The Red Sea Press.
- 2004 Kusow, Abdi M. 2004. "Contesting Stigma: On Goffman's Assumptions of Normative Order," Symbolic Interaction 27:179-197. (in the top 20 most read articles in Symbolic Interaction).
- 2006 Kusow, Abdi M. 2006. "Migration and Racial Formations among Somali Immigrants in North America." Journal of Ethnic and Migration Studies 32: 533-551.
- 2007 Kusow, Abdi M. "Stigma," in The Encyclopedia of Sociology, edited by George Ritzer. Oxford UK: Blackwell, forthcoming.
- 2007 Ajrouch, Kristine, and Abdi Kusow. "Racial and Religious Contexts: Situational Identities among Lebanese and Somali Muslim Immigrants in North America." Ethnic and Racial Studies 30:72-94.
- 2007 Kusow, Abdi M. "East African Immigrants in the United States," in The New Americans: A Handbook to Immigration Since 1965, edited by Mary Waters and Reed Ueda. Cambridge: Harvard University Press, forthcoming.

Research reports/published proceedings

- 1993 Kusow, Abdi M. "Prospects and Perspectives on Conflict Resolution in Somalia," Proceedings of the 7th International Conference on the Horn of Africa, Center for the Study of the Horn of Africa, Queens College/CUNY, New York, 14-20.
- 1993 Kusow, Abdi M. "Power Struggles and Continued Human Suffering in Somalia," Proceedings of the Symposium on Human Disaster and World Politics, Institute for African Development, Cornell University, Ithaca, NY, 1993.
- 1993 Muktar, M. and Abdi Kusow, "The Boonka Conference and Beyond: An Investigation of the Bottom Up Grass-roots Reconciliation Process of the Clan Elders of Southern Somalia," Life and Peace Institute, Uppsala, Sweden, 1993.
- 2006 Mohamud, S. Abdinur, and Abdi M. Kusow. "Why Somalia Continues to Remains a Failed State." African Renaissance 3: 13-23

== Awards ==
In 2015, he and Mohamed Eno won the Maines Narrative Research Award for their work on "Formula Narratives and the Making of Social Stratification and Inequality".
