= Abdi Ismail Samatar =

Somali scholar, writer and professor (born 1950)

- عبدي إسماعيل سمتر
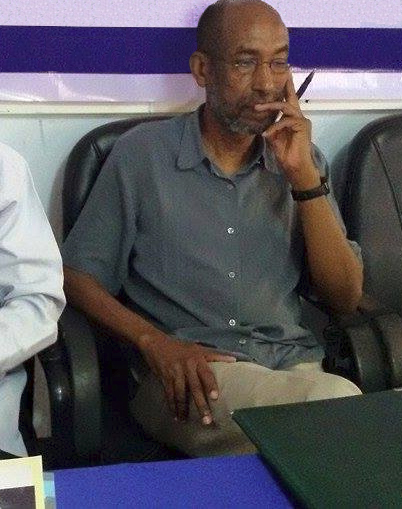
- Professor Abdi Samatar at lecture
- Born: 1952 (age 73–74); Gabiley, British Somaliland (now Somalia)
- Citizenship: Somali, American
- Education: University of Wisconsin–La Crosse; Iowa State University; University of California, Berkeley
- Occupations: scholar, writer, professor
- Relatives: Ahmed Ismail Samatar
- Writing career
- Subjects: geography, democracy, development
- Notable awards: Outstanding Community Service Award (2004); Design Achievement Award (2000); Collegiate Teaching Award (1989–90)

Abdi Ismail Samatar (Somali: Cabdi Ismaaciil Samatar, Arabic: عبدي إسماعيل ساماتار) (born 1950) is a Somali scholar, writer and professor of geography.

== Personal life ==
Samatar was born in 1956 in Gabiley in Somalia. He is the brother of scholar and politician Ahmed Ismail Samatar.

For his tertiary education, Samatar earned an A.B. from the University of Wisconsin–La Crosse in 1979. He later obtained a MCRP in Urban/Regional Planning from the Iowa State University in 1981. In 1985, he completed a PhD from the University of California, Berkeley.

Samatar is Muslim.

== Career ==
Between the late 1980s and early 1990s, Samatar was a lecturer at the University of Iowa. He later joined the University of Minnesota's faculty, serving as a professor of geography and chair of the institution's geography department.

He has authored several books centered on democracy and development in the Africa. In 2000, his non-fiction work An African Miracle was a finalist for the year's Herskovits Prize.

In Spring 2003, Samatar was the Chair of the Harmonization Committee of the Somali Charter: Somali Reconciliation – Independent Committee.

In 2013–2014, he also served as the President of the African Studies Association. Additionally, he has been a frequent guest or contributor at various international media outlets, including Voice of America, PBS, Al Jazeera, the BBC, Radio France International, Australian Broadcasting Corporation, TV Channel 5 and Somali TV Minneapolis.

On January 30 he was appointed to leader of the election commission to oversee the integrity of the Somalia presidential elections that were held 8 February 2017.

== Awards ==
Samatar has received various awards for his work, including:

- University of Minnesota President's Award for Service, 2018
- University of Minnesota Somali Student Association Award, 2017
- University of Minnesota Outstanding Community Service Award, 2004
- Finalist, Herskovits Award of the African Studies Association for An African Miracle, 2000
- Fulbright Scholar Award, 1993/4 and 1999
- Design Achievement Award in recognition for substantial contribution to the field of Community and Regional Planning, Iowa State University, October 20, 2000
- Certificate of Recognition for Outstanding Teaching and Leadership in Community-University Collaboration, University of Minnesota, 1997
- Collegiate Teaching Award, University of Iowa, 1989–90

== Professional memberships ==
Samatar's professional memberships include:

- Editorial Board, African Geographic Review Journal
- Editorial Board, Bildan: Somali Studies Journal
- Member, board of directors of African Studies Association, 2002–2004
- President of African Studies Association, 2013–2014
- Committee member, MacArthur Compton Fellowships
- Graduate Education Policy

== Selected works ==
- Framing Somalia: Beyond Africa's Merchants of Misery" Abdi Simalia Samatar, 2022.
- Africa’s First Democrats: Somalia’s Aden A. Osman and Abdirazak H. Hussen. Abdi Ismail Samatar, 2016
- The African State: Reconsideration. Samatar, Abdi, Ahmed Samatar, Co-Editor, 2002.
- An African Miracle: State and Class Leadership and Colonial Legacy in Botswana. Samatar, Abdi, Heinemann, 1999.
- "The Dialectics of Piracy in Somalia: the Poor versus the Rich". Samatar, Abdi, Third World Quarterly, December 2010.
- "Faithless Power as Fraticide: Is there an Alternative in Somalia?" Samatar, Abdi, International Journal of Somali Studies, 9 63–81, 2009.
- "Back to the Future". Samatar, Abdi, BBC Focus on Africa Magazine, July–September 34–5, 2008.
- "Debating Somali Identity in a British Tribunal". The BBC Somali Service. Samatar, Abdi, Author, 2007.
- "The Islamic Courts and the Mogadishu Miracle: What comes Next for Somalia". Samatar, Abdi, Review of African political Economy, Fall 2006.
- "The Ethiopian Election of 2005: A Bombshell & Turning Point". Samatar, Abdi, Review of African Political Economy, 104/5, 2005.
- Ethiopian Federalism: Autonomy versus Control in the Somali Region. Samatar, Abdi, Author, 2004.
- Editorial of Somali Reconciliation. Samatar, Abdi, Ahmed Samatar, 2003.
- Somalis as Africa's First Democrats. Samatar, Abdi, Ahmed Samatar, 2002.
- Local Initiatives and Somali Reconstruction. Samatar, Abdi, 2001.
- Social Transformation and Islamic Reinterpretation in Northern Somalia: The Women's Mosque in Gabiley. Samatar, Abdi, 2000.
- Ethnicity and leadership in the making of African state models: Botswana versus Somalia. Samatar, Abdi, 1997.
