= Hussein Mohamed Adam =

Professor (b. 1943, d. 2017)

Hussein Mohamed Adam Xuseen Maxamed Aadan
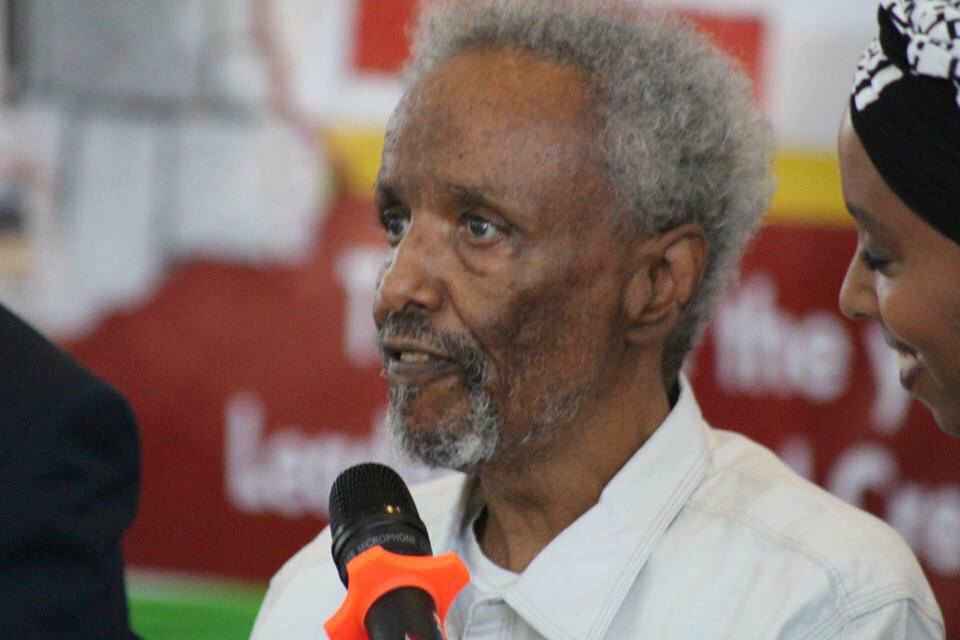
- Born: 1943; Arusha, Tanganyika (now Tanzania)
- Died: 14 January 2017 (aged 73–74); Boston, Massachusetts, United States
- Education: Princeton University; Harvard University; Makerere University

Hussein Mohammed Adam "Tanzania" (Somali: Xuseen Maxamed Aadan "Tansaaniya") was a Somali professor, originally from hargeisa, Somaliland, but born and raised in Arusha, Tanzania. He graduated in 1966 with his undergraduate degree from Princeton University. He gained his PhD in political science from Harvard University and a master's degree from Makerere University with his book "A Nation in Search of a Script".

In addition to being a professor, he was a journalist and documentary maker. His most acclaimed documentary, "Limits to Submission," was about the consequences of the Ogaden War in 1977.

== Academic background and publications ==
Adam was a professor of political science at the College of the Holy Cross in the United States of America, specializing in comparative politics with a focus on the Horn of Africa. In the early 1970s, he served as the head of the Center of African Studies at Brandeis University. He was the founder and president of the Somali Studies International Association (SSIA) and was the founding director of the Somali Unit for Research on Emergency and Rural Development (SURERD), an indigenous NGO in Mogadishu (1981–87). Adam was a member of the African Studies Association, the World Bank Council of African Advisors, and the African Association of Political Science. He was the recipient of the Hewlett Mellon Award at Harvard University, W. E. B. DuBois fellowship, De Witt Clinton Poole Memorial Prize, Rockefeller fellowship, and the African Development Foundation fellowship. His work was published in African Affairs, Review of African Political Economy, Journal of Islamic Studies (Oxford University Press), and Peace Review.

== Death ==
Adam died on 14 January 2017 in Boston, Massachusetts, United States.
