= Ali Jimale Ahmed =

Somali writer

- احمد على جمعالى
- Born: Cali Jimcaale Axmed; 30 August 1958; Mogadishu, Somalia
- Died: 31st of March, 2026 (aged 67); United States
- Education: Mogadishu
- Alma mater: Banadir high school, UCLA
- Occupations: Essayist; poet; scholar; writer
- Children: Halima Ali Jimale Ahmed, Fatima Ali Jimale Ahmed, Mikail Ali Jimale Ahmed
- Writing career
- Period: 1969 to early 1970's

Ali Jimale Ahmed (Somali: Cali Jimcaale Axmed) was a Somali scholar, author, poet, and a professor.

== Biography ==
Ali held a Doctor of Philosophy from the University of California, Los Angeles (UCLA). At the time of his passing, he was the current professor and former chair of Comparative Literature at Queens College and CUNY Graduate Center. Ali would teach courses in African, Middle Eastern, and European literature. His poetry and short stories have also been translated into several languages, including Japanese and the languages spoken in the former Yugoslavia.

Ali would teach Comparative Literature at Queens College and the Graduate Center of the City University of New York.

== Publications ==
- The Invention of Somalia, (The Red Sea Press: 1995), ISBN 978-0-932415-99-8, OCLC 31376757
- Daybreak is Near: Literature, Clans, and the Nation-state in Somalia, (Red Sea Press: 1997), ISBN 978-1-56902-023-4, OCLC 34633323
- Fear is a Cow, (The Red Sea Press: 2002), ISBN 978-1-56902-159-0, OCLC 48263696
- Diaspora Blues, (The Red Sea Press: 2005), ISBN 1-56902-239-9
- The Road Less Traveled: Reflections On The Literatures Of The Horn Of Africa , (The Red Sea Press: 2008), ISBN 1-56902-207-0
