= Abdi Eissa =

Abdi Eissa Adam عبدالله بن عيسى بن آدم

Leader of the Isaaq
- Predecessor: Position established King Harun as King of the Isaaq
- Successor: Position abolished Guled Abdi as Sultan of the Isaaq
- Born: 1680; Isaaq kingdom
- Died: 1760 (aged 80); Isaaq Sultanate
- Spouse: Iido Cagawayn
- House: House of Dhamal
- Religion: Sunni Islam

Abdi Eissa Adan Dhamal, also known as Abdi Gahayr or simply Abdi Eissa was a prominent 18th-century leader, religious scholar, and military commander from the Isaaq clan-family, particularly associated with the House of Guled of the Garhajis,Eidagale sub-clan. He was born into the Adan Dhamal Noble Family at a time of growing tensions between the Isaaq clans and their neighbors, notably the Absame tribes and the Ogaden, as well as the waning Tol Jeclo dynasty, which had previously held dominance over many Isaaq territories.

Often considered a respected elder and a devout man, Abdi Eissa earned recognition for his wisdom, military experience, and for being the founding father of the Isaaq Sultanate, where he crowned his son as the first sultan of the Isaaq Sultanate.

== Early life ==
He was born into the wealthy Eissa Dhamal Noble Family, or House of Dhamal, who held sway over the Eidagale sub-clan. He would spend his early years as a religious mullah, where he excelled in Quranic and Islamic studies. He would along with his brother liban join the ongoing war against their neighbors and he would be a commander.

He was a part of the commanders of the Lafaruug War, but soon the commanders of the war died in battle. The king of the Isaaqs at the time, King Harun, known as Dhuh Barar, appointed him as the new commander of the Isaaq forces.

== Military career ==
Throughout the war, as the new commander, Abdi Eissa proved himself to be a capable leader, winning a number of victories against the Absame clans. His most notable victory was the Battle of Lafaruug, where, along with his son and soon-to-be Sultan Guled, and his brother Liban Eissa, won the battle, securing a decisive victory for the Isaaqs.

Upon this victory, Abdi Eissa was recognized as a capable leader and was even offered to r ule as the new head of the Isaaqs by the isaaq elders—a position which he declined, instead offering it to his young son Guled, who was subsequently crowned as the first Sultan of the Isaaq, changing the government from a hereditary kingdom to a hereditary sultanate.

== Overthrow of the Tol Je’lo Dynasty ==
Despite Abdi Eissa’s initial good relations with the king and the monarchy—being among the most powerful people and the head of a noble family—he would soon come to resent the king’s oppressive and greedy rule. He became part of a growing movement against the king. The king remained oblivious to this new movement and continued oppressing his subjects.

One day, during the regular meetings of different sub-clans and families with the king, the Sacad Muse were absent from the meeting, instead creeping behind the curtains and listening. The king questioned what happened to the Sacad Muse and was told they were absent. The king then coined a famous phrase among the Isaaqs: “The advice of the Sacad Muse and the marrow of young goats are essential, so call them in.”

For demanding such a expensive type of marrow at the time, the king was nicknamed “Dhuux Baraar,” which literally translates to “The marrow of young goats,” signifying his greed.

Eventually, the king demanded that every noble give the eye of his daughter to the king’s daughter as a sign of loyalty. A full revolution broke out, and the king was overthrown by Abdi Eissa and his faction, with the king himself assassinated by a man named Ugaadh.

The entire royal family and dynasty experienced a genocide, as the angry people massacred every member of the House of Tol Je’lo or the Tol Je’lo Dynasty. The Tol Je’lo were eventually granted forgiveness and sought shelter among the Sacad Muuse Habar Awal, with whom they still live today.

== Later life and legacy ==
Despite declining the position of sultan, he continued to rule the Isaaqs as a regent for his very young son, Sultan Guled, until Guled came of age and ruled in his own right. He later died, leaving a lasting legacy on the Isaaqs, with his noble family, the Adan Dhamal, still holding prestige.

His son would go on to be the founder and head of the House of Guled, which to this day holds the title of Grand Sultan of Isaaq.

== See also ==
- Guled Abdi (Sultan)
- Isaaq kingdom
- Overthrow of the Toljeclo dynasty
- Isaaq Sultanate
- House of Guled
- Isaaq
