= Overthrow of the Toljeclo dynasty =

Overthrow of the Tolje’lo
- Part of History of Somaliland
- Date: 1749
- Location: Isaaq kingdom
- Participants: Tolje'lo dynasty, Isaaq coalition
- Outcome: End of the rule of the Tolje'lo dynasty; Death of King Dhuh Baraar, the last Tolje'lo king; Abdi Eissa seized power and ruled as regent until 1750; Battle of Lafaruug; Establishment of the Isaaq Sultanate in July 1750; Rise of House of Guled into power

The overthrow of the Tolje'lo occurred in 1749 in the Isaaq Kingdom when King Dhuh Baraar, the last monarch of the Tolje'lo dynasty, was overthrown and killed in a coup led by a coalition of Isaaq clans under Abdi Eissa, a religious mullah and military leader.

== Background ==
By the 1300s, the Isaaq clans had united to defend their territories and resources during conflicts with migrating clans. By the 1600s, after the fall of the Adal Sultanate, Somali-inhabited lands fragmented into various clan states, including the Isaaq. According to oral tradition, the Isaaq clan family was ruled by a dynasty from the Tolje'lo branch, descendants of Ahmed "Tol Je'lo," the eldest son of Sheikh Ishaaq. Eight Tolje'lo rulers governed starting from the 13th century.

== See also ==
- Isaaq Sultanate
- House of Guled
