= Battle of Lafaruug (1749) =

1749 Battle in Somaliland

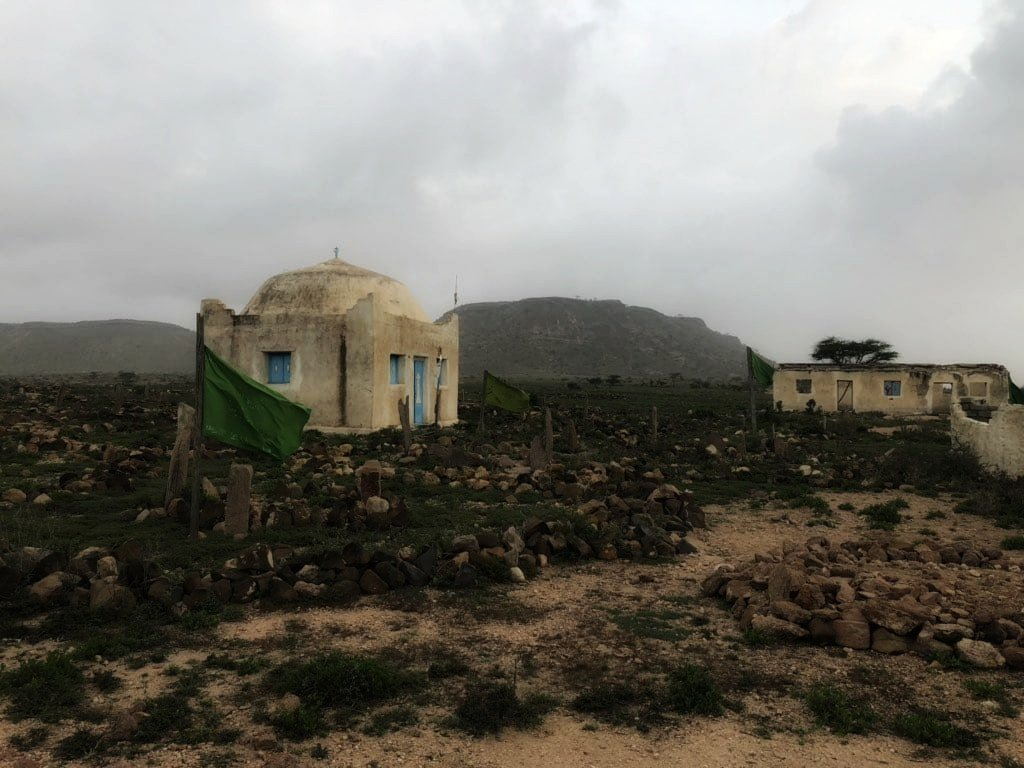
- Site of the Battle of Lafa-Ruug in 2021
| Date | 1749 |
| Location | Lafa-Ruug, present-day Somaliland |
| Result | Isaaq victory: Establishment of the Isaaq Sultanate; Isaaq expansion into southern Saaxil and parts of Maroodi Jeex |

Belligerents
| Isaaq Sultanate | Absame tribes Ogaden tribes |

Commanders and leaders
| Abdi Eisa Adan; Liban Eissa Adan; Guled Abdi Eissa | Ughaz Nur Abudhiye †; Ughaz Jiir Arale † |

Strength
| Unknown | Unknown |

Casualties and losses
| Unknown | Unknown |

The Battle of Lafaruug took place in 1749 when Abdi Eisa, the father of the first Isaaq sultan, Sultan Guled Abdi, led the Isaaq forces to victory over the Absame and Ogaden tribes near the town of Lafa-Ruug. This battle established the dominance of the Isaaq Clan in the region and marked the beginning of the Isaaq Sultanate a year later.

== Background ==
Abdi Eissa was an Isaaq leader, Religious Mullah and a Military leader for the Isaaq king at the time of the Tol jeclo dynasty named Boqor or King Harun dhuh Barar. Abdi rose to prominence after overthrowing the Tol Jeclo dynasty that had previously ruled the Isaaq clan. The last King from the Tol Jeclo dynasty, King Harun (nicknamed dhuux baraar) has been described as a very cruel man, which led to Abdi Eissa's dissatisfaction with him. He organized a coalition of Isaaq clans to end the oppressive rule of the Tol Jeclo, positioning himself as a regent. In a show of humility, Abdi Eisa declined the leadership title for himself and instead installed his underage son Guled as the first sultan of the Isaaq clan in July 1750, acting as regent until Guled came of age.

== Battle ==
The battle was fought near the vicinity of Lafa-Ruug. Abdi Eisa's leadership led to a decisive victory for the Isaaq forces. His ability to unify various Isaaq Subclans under a single cause was a key factor in their success.

It is said that the name “Lafa-ruug” is a reference to the harshness of the battle, where the Absame tribes suffered heavy casualties.

== Aftermath ==
Following the battle, the Isaaq clan firmly established its dominance in the region. The leadership of the Isaaq clan transitioned into a hereditary sultanate under Sultan Guled. Abdi Eisa's coalition-building and strategic vision laid the groundwork for the establishment of the Isaaq Sultanate.
