= Hassan Farah =

Sultan Hassan Sultan Farah
- Sultan of the Isaaq Sultanate
- Reign: 1845 – 1870
- Predecessor: Sultan Farah
- Successor: Sultan Dirie
- Born: Unknown
- Died: 1870
- House: House of Guled
- Religion: Sunni Islam

Sultan Hassan Sultan Farah Sultan Guled was the third sultan of the Isaaq Sultanate. He was the son of Sultan Farah.

== Biography ==
=== Ascension ===
Sultan Hassan ascended the throne after the death of his father, Sultan Farah, who was traveling to Berbera. During this royal journey, a group of nomads, mistaking the caravan for an Ogaden trade convoy, attempted to rob it. When they realized it was the Sultan’s caravan, they ceased their robbery attempt. However, after an altercation with one of the Sultan's bodyguards, a nomad named Dul Guduud threw a spear that fatally struck Sultan Farah. Sultan Hassan was proclaimed the new sultan upon his father's death.

=== Berbera Civil War ===
One of the most important settlements of the Sultanate was the city of Berbera which was one of the key ports of the Gulf of Aden. Caravans would pass through Hargeisa and the Sultan would collect tribute and taxes from traders before they would be allowed to continue onwards to the coast. Following a massive conflict between the Ayal Ahmed and Ayal Yunis branches of the Habr Awal over who would control Berbera in the mid-1840s, Sultan Hassan brought both subclans before a holy relic from the tomb of Aw Barkhadle. An item that is said to have belonged to Bilal Ibn Rabah.

When any grave question arises affecting the interests of the Isaakh tribe in general. On a paper yet carefully preserved in the tomb, and bearing the sign-manual of Belat [Bilal], the slave of one [of] the early khaleefehs, fresh oaths of lasting friendship and lasting alliances are made...In the season of 1846 this relic was brought to Berbera in charge of the Haber Gerhajis, and on it the rival tribes of Aial Ahmed and Aial Yunus swore to bury all animosity and live as brethren.

Despite this resolution, control of Berbera later passed to the ambitious Isaaq merchant and politician Sharmarke Ali Saleh, who would eventually become governor and emir of Zeila and Tadjoura.

=== Death ===
Sultan Hassan died in 1870. He was succeeded by his son, Sultan Deria, who ascended the throne at the age of 15 and became the longest-reigning Isaaq sultan, ruling for 66 years and would be nearly a hundred years old by the end of his reign.

== See also ==
- Sultan Guled
- Sultan Farah
- Sultan Dirie
- House of Guled
