= Abdiqadir Abdillahi =

Sultan of Isaaq (r. 1969–1975)

Abdiqadir Abdillahi سلطان عبدالقادر بن عبدالله

Sultan of Isaaq
- Reign: 1969–1975
- Predecessor: Rashid Abdillahi
- Successor: Mahamed Abdiqadir
- Died: 1975; Hargeisa, Somali Democratic Republic (now Somaliland)
- Dynasty: Guled Dynasty
- Religion: Sunni Islam

Abdiqadir Abdillahi (Somali: Suldaan Cabdiqaadir Suldaan Cabdillaahi, Arabic: عبدالقادر بن عبدالله) was the seventh Grand Sultan of the Isaaq Sultanate. He ruled from 1969 to 1975, when he died. He was succeeded by his son, Mahamed Abdiqadir.

== Biography ==
He returned from self-exile in Kuwait to succeed his brother Sultan Rashid Abdillahi after his death in 1969. He had previously left Somaliland after his father Sultan Abdillahi Deria rejected a British proposal to recognize his father as Sultan of the Somaliland Protectorate, restructuring it similar to the Gulf monarchies. After his father's rejection he vowed not to return to Somaliland until the deaths of both his father and brother.
