= Daud Mahamed =

Sultan of Isaaq (r. 2021–present)

Sultan Daud Sultan Mahamed سلطان داؤد بن محمد
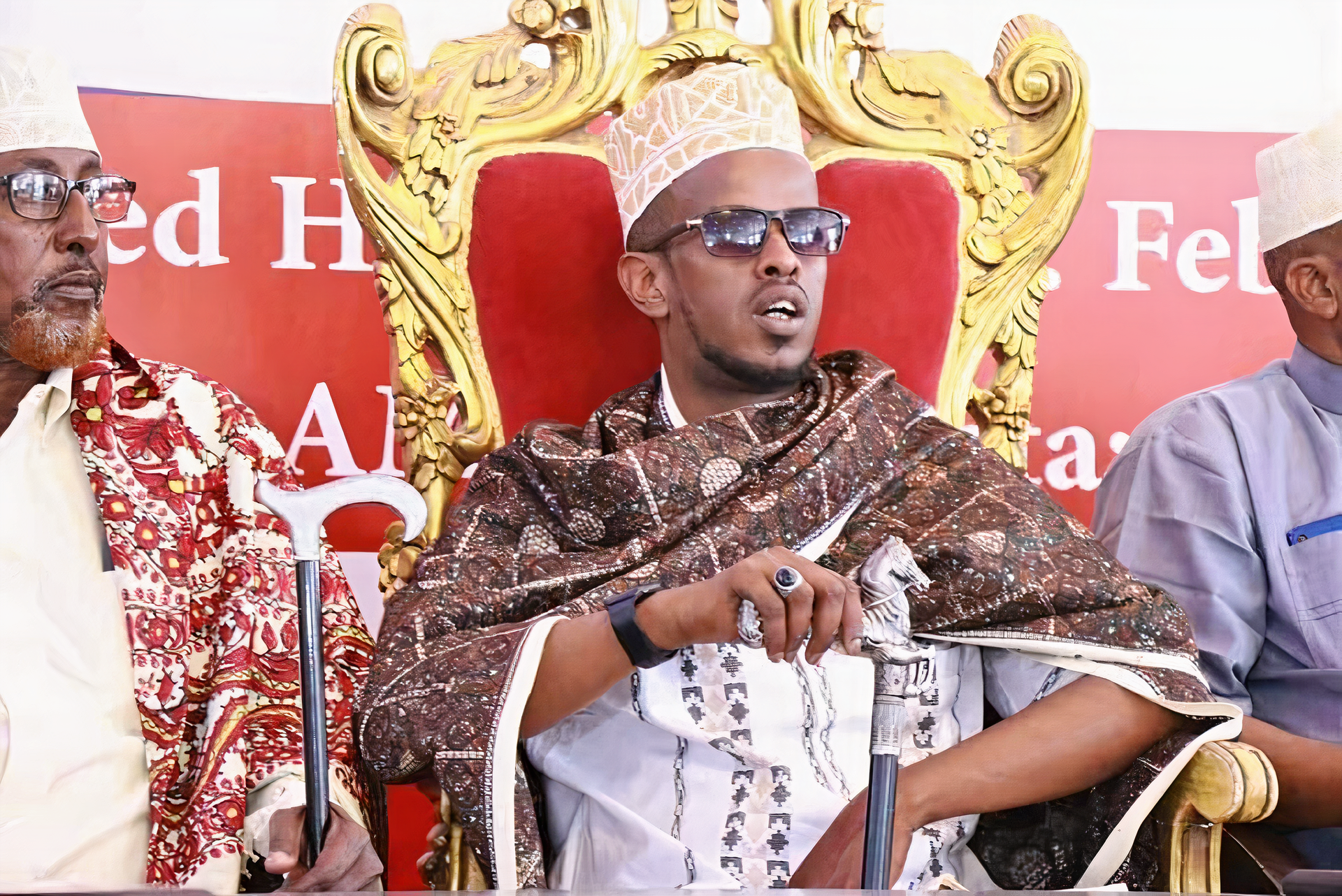
- Sultan Daud at a gathering

Sultan of the Isaaq Grand Sultan of Somaliland
- Reign: 12 February 2021 – present
- Coronation: 13 February 2021
- Predecessor: Mahamed Abdiqadir
- Born: Hargeisa, Somaliland
- Dynasty: Guled Dynasty
- Religion: Sunni Islam

Sultan Daud Mahamed (Somali: Suldaan Daa'uud Suldaan Maxamed, Arabic: داؤد بن محمد بن عبدالقادر) is the ninth and current Grand Sultan of the Isaaq Sultanate. He was crowned on 13 February 2021 in Hargeisa, capital of Somaliland, a day after his father Sultan Mahamed Abdiqadir died, in a ceremony held beside the grave of his father, per the traditions of the Isaaq.

== See also ==
- Somalia–Somaliland border
- Ethiopia–Somaliland border

Preceded by Mahamed Abdiqadir	Sultan of the Isaaq since 2021	Succeeded by incumbent
