= Deria Hassan =

Sultan of Isaaq (r. 1870–1939)

Deria Hassan سلطان ديريه بن حسن
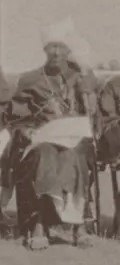
- Sultan Deria in Hargeisa, 1916

Sultan of Isaaq
- Reign: 1870–1943
- Predecessor: Hassan Farah
- Successor: Abdillahi Deria
- Born: 1855; Isaaq Sultanate
- Died: 1943 (aged 87–88); Hargeisa, British Somaliland
- Dynasty: Guled Dynasty
- Religion: Sunni Islam

Deria Hassan (Somali: Diiriye Xasan, Arabic: ديريه بن حسن) was a Somali ruler. He was the fourth Grand Sultan of the Isaaq Sultanate and known as a shrewd and wise leader.

== Biography ==
Sultan Deria Hassan was the son of Sultan Hassan and the great-grandson of Sultan Guled Abdi, the founder of the Guled Dynasty of the Eidagale clan. He was 15 when he was crowned as sultan of the Isaaq.

Deria was the longest reigning Sultan having ascended to the throne in the late 19th century and dying of old age in 1943, succeeded by his son Abdillahi. By the end of his reign Deria was reported to be nearly a hundred years old. Deria also regularly exacted tribute from the Isaaq sub-clans.

Deria would meet with Sheikh Madar outside Hargeisa in a famous 1870 shir to discuss issues regarding the new town of Hargeisa and agreed that poaching and tree cutting in the vicinity should be banned.

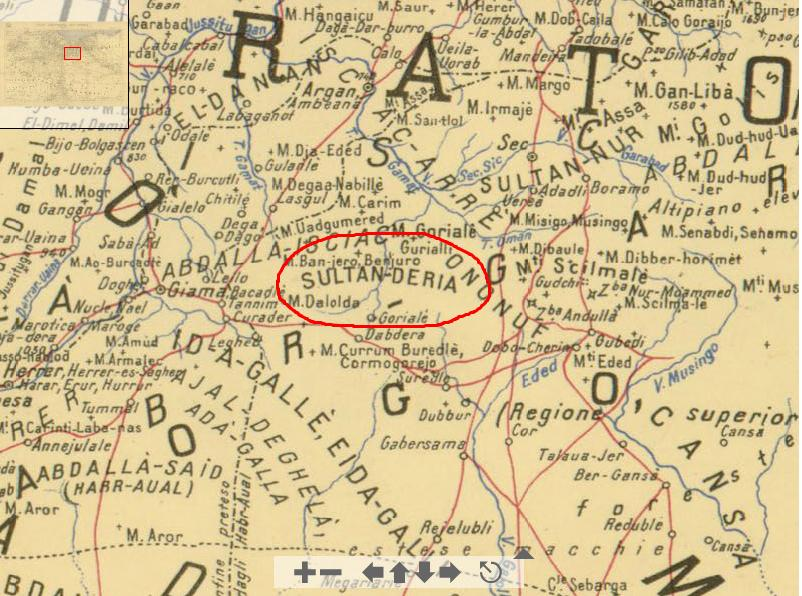
Sultan Deria's domain in an Italian map of the Horn, 1894

=== Reign ===
As sultan of Isaaq, he also was the paramount leader of his Eidagale clan. Standing against him was a similarly skilled poet and warrior Hersi Absiyeh (Somali: Xirsi Cabsiye), a prominent member of the closely related Rer Abdi Bari who were warring with the Rer Guled. He called for the regular shir or meeting of subclans where he would take council and advise on what decisions to make next for the Eidagale. Sultan Deria ruled that blood payment or mag was sufficient for both parties to exchange at the shir with the Rer Guled losing six and the Abdi Bari six as well. Hussein Hasan was boastful and urged for continued conflict with this rousing gabay rejecting the decision.

Lix nin oo mankiyo shaalka iyo midhaha Guuleed ah
Oo wada ma dhaafta ah raggii ugu maloongeeyey
Inaan waliba maal ugu daraa waa masalo dhaafe
Waligeed markaha looma culin magannu soocnaaye
Waa waxaanay dhagahaygu maqal maanta ka horoowe
Inaanaan cayuun soo madhayn mudhayo dhaadheer leh
Haddaynu Reer Mataan nahay sidaa waydun maan garane

— Xuseen Xasan
Translation:

Six men who are the buds, the shawl and the fruit (youth) of Guuleed
Who together were the best, most excellent of men
That I add wealth to that is beyond the pale
We’ll never purify the vessel with blood compensation which we have separated off
This is something my ears have never heard before today
That we empty [our hands] of very tall camels
If we are Reer Mataan you will follow my thinking

Sultan Deria responded by sending Hussein away to Berbera and then resuming the shir. Absiyeh was made to swear a solemn oath not to recite a gabay following the Sultan's decision but he could not resist, especially since Hussein was away. Hussein returned and lamented that he missed the occasion and the two other men (Deria and Absiyeh) prevailed that day.

==== Dervish Era ====
In the year 1899, Sultan Deria Hassan received one of the earliest letters sent by Muhammad Abdullah Hassan to garner support for the then fledgling Dervish Movement. This shows how influential Sultan Deria was in the Somali north since he was earnestly implored by the Mullah to join him in his endeavors.

I have the honour to enclose a translation of a letter from the Mullah Muhammad Abdullah to the Aidagalleh, as a specimen of the manner in which he has been trying to seduce the tribes from their allegiance to us. Although this letter has only come into my hands there is reason to believe that it reached Sultan Deria of the Aidagalleh some two months ago, for the Sheikh Madar tells me that about that time Sultan Deria sent a message to him saying that he had heard from the Mullah and asking his advice as to whether he should join him or not.

It appears that Deria heeded the call for support as the Sultan instigated a major insurrection in the town of Hargeisa as well as supplying Abdullah Hassan with vital information.

Lieutenant Byrne reports to me that Sultan Deria is the principal cause of unrest around Hargaisa. He is in communication with the Mullah, supplying him with information and giving every assistance prior to joining him himself.

==== Rebellions ====
Deria's reign saw some instability and revolts that were swiftly contained. Swayne recounts an incident where a portion of the Eidagale broke away, but were quickly brought to heel.

The late Assistant Resident at Berbera had a case brought before him in which a part of the Eidegale tribe had thrown off allegiance to Sultan Deria, and when his intervention was successful, one of the terms proposed by the delinquents themselves was that they would stand before him as a recognition of their return to his control.

Preceded by Hassan Farah	Isaaq Sultanate	Succeeded by Abdillahi Deria

== See also ==
- Somali aristocratic and court titles
- Garhajis
- Hussein Hasan poet and warrior
- Nur Ahmed Aman contemporary of Sultan Deria Hassan and Sultan of the Habr Yunis
- Abdillahi Deria the son and successor of Sultan Deria Hassan
- Farah Nur
- Isaaq
