= Abdillahi Deria =

Sultan of Isaaq (r. 1939–1967)

Abdillahi Deria سلطان عبدالله بن ديريه
- Sultan of Isaaq
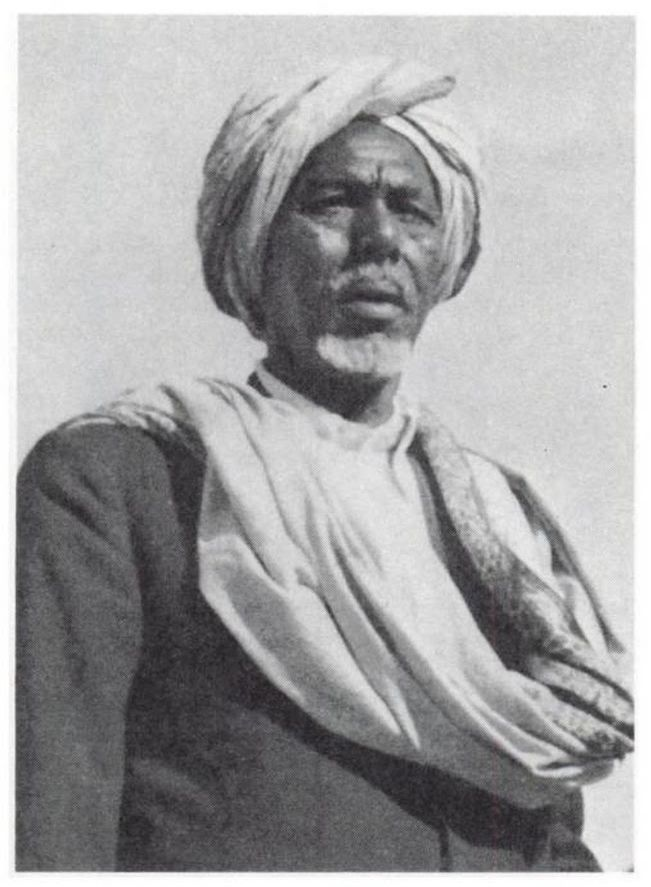
- Photograph of Sultan Abdillahi
- Reign: 1943 – January 1967
- Predecessor: Deria Hassan
- Successor: Rashid Abdillahi
- Born: Hargeisa, Isaaq Sultanate
- Died: January 1967; Hargeisa, Somali Republic (now Somaliland)
- Dynasty: Guled Dynasty
- Religion: Sunni Islam

Abdillahi Deria (Somali: Cabdillaahi Diiriye, Arabic: عبدالله بن ديريه; died January 1967) was the fifth Grand Sultan of the Isaaq Sultanate and a notable Somali anti-colonial figure.

== Biography ==
Abdillahi was the son of Sultan Deria Hassan whom he succeeded in 1943 after his death. Abdillahi was described as a religious man, and was educated in Aden before returning to Somaliland in 1920.

A member of the Eidagale sub-division of the Garhajis subclan, Abdillahi's reign covered the later years of British Somaliland and most of the subsequent Somali Republic.

The British administration proposed that the British Somaliland protectorate be reconstituted into a tribal kingdom similar to the Gulf monarchies, with Abdillahi recognized as the Sultan, however Abdillahi rejected the idea.

Abdulqadir, the Sultan's son, who supported this plan, was deeply disappointed by his father's rejection of the proposal. That day, he vowed to leave the country and not return to Somaliland as long as his father Sultan Abdillahi, his brother Rashid Sultan Abdillahi, and his sister Sahra Sultan Abdillahi were alive.

He was granted permanent residency in Kuwait and did not return to Somaliland until after his brother Sultan Rashid—who was the last surviving family member—passed away and was succeeded in the sultanate by him.

=== Somali National League ===
Sultan Abdillahi was a vehement anti-colonialist and was a prominent member of the Somali National League the dominant party in the protectorate. He directly encouraged agitation and petitions by local British Somaliland communities to file with authorities. He would soon become the secretary general of the party and one of its critical tasks was resolving the Haud dispute.

==== Haud Delegation ====
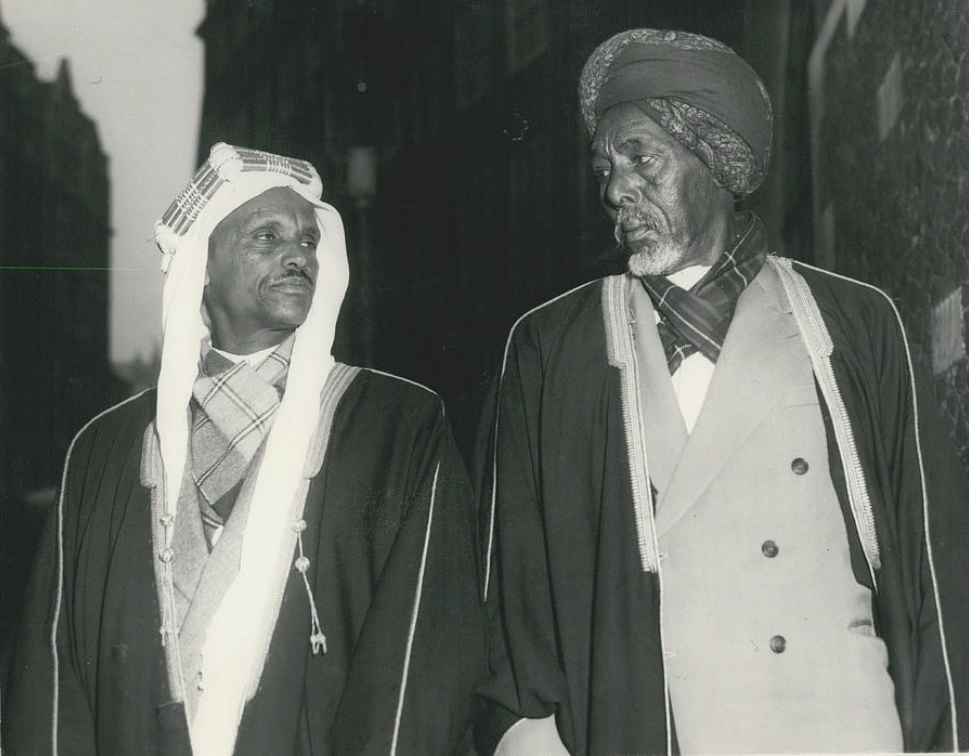
Sultans Abdulrahman Deria (left) and Abdillahi Deria (right) in London, 1955

In response to the cessation of Haud Reserve and the Ogaden regions to Ethiopia in the year 1948, Abdillahi led a delegation of politicians and Sultans to the United Kingdom in order to petition and pressure the government to return them.

In Imperial Policies and Nationalism in The Decolonization of Somaliland, 1954–1960, Historian Jama Mohamed writes:

The N.U.F. campaigned for the return of the territories both in Somaliland and abroad. In March 1955, for instance, a delegation consisting of Michael Mariano, Abokor Haji Farah and Abdi Dahir went to Mogadisho to win the support and co-operation of the nationalist groups in Somalia. And in February and May 1955 another delegation consisting of two traditional Sultans (Sultan Abdillahi Sultan Deria, and Sultan Abdulrahman Sultan Deria), and two Western-educated moderate politicians (Michael Mariano, Abdirahman Ali Mohamed Dubeh) visited London and New York. During their tour of London, they formally met and discussed the issue with the Secretary of State for the Colonies, Alan Lennox-Boyd. They told Lennox-Boyd about the 1885 Anglo-Somali treaties. Under the agreements, Michael Mariano stated, the British Government 'undertook never to cede, sell, mortgage or otherwise give for occupation, save to the British Government, any portion of the territory inhabited by them or being under their control'. But now the Somali people 'have heard that their land was being given to Ethiopia under an Anglo-Ethiopian Treaty of 1897'. That treaty, however, was 'in conflict' with the Anglo-Somali treaties 'which took precedence in time' over the 1897 Anglo-Ethiopian Treaty[.] The British Government had 'exceeded its powers when it concluded the 1897 Treaty and ... the 1897 Treaty was not binding on the tribes.' Sultan Abdillahi also added that the 1954 agreement was a 'great shock to the Somali people' since they had not been told about the negotiations, and since the British Government had been administering the area since 1941. The delegates requested, as Sultan Abdulrahman put it, the postponement of the implementation of the agreement to 'grant the delegation time to put up their case' in Parliament and in international organizations.

=== Dissent and independence ===
Although ultimately unsuccessful in their endeavor the party had won the hearts and minds of the northern Somali people in their move to regain the Haud. Abdillahi & the SNL pivoted towards preparing for independence and interfered with British attempts to guide the process unilaterally. Through boycotts and successful campaigning the SNL was able to reduce expected turnout for elections from 30,000 to 2,000. British authorities were attempting to make the new council consist of many of their own and the SNL demanded a 100% Somali council free of colonial officers. in 1959 Sultan Abdillahi sent a letter stating he was representative of the majority in British Somaliland to the nascent legislative assembly in Trust Territory of Somaliland, calling upon them to facilitate union and work for joint independence by 1960. Aden Adde the future first president of Somalia and current president of the assembly at the time responded to the sultan.

Your wishes coincide with the desires of every Somali wherever he may be, and is the ultimate aim of the whole Somali Nation, while in the name of the people, the Legislature and the Government of Somalia we express to you our gratitude and thanks. We pray God omnipotent to help us in our just and common ideals.

British officials were infuriated at the move and tried to recommend 1965 as the preferred date, but were rebuffed and received warnings from many prominent Somalis. Ultimately independence was achieved by June 26 of 1960 in British Somaliland with the Trust Territory of Somaliland achieving independence 5 days later on July 1 with unification occurring on the same day. Sultan Abdillahi slaughtered a camel on the occasion of the unification.

He died in January 1967, and was succeeded by his eldest son Sultan Rashid Abdillahi.

Preceded by Deria Hassan	Sultan of the Isaaq	Succeeded by Rashid Abdillahi

== See also ==
- Somali aristocratic and court titles
- Sultan Deria Hassan, Sultan Abdillahi's father
- Sultan Abdulrahman Deria the sultan of the Habr Awal, friend of Sultan Abdillahi, and fellow member of Haud Delegation
- Michael Mariano veteran Somali politician and member of the Haud Delegation
- Aden Adde first president of Somalia and correspondent with the sultan
- Garhajis Abdillahi's subclan
- Isaaq
