= Farah Guled =

Sultan of Isaaq (r. 1808–1845)

Farah Guled سلطان فارح بن جوليد

Sultan of Isaaq
- Reign: 1808–1845
- Predecessor: Guled Abdi
- Successor: Hassan Guled
- Died: 1845; Hamaas, Sahil
- Dynasty: Guled Dynasty
- Father: Sultan Guled Abdi
- Mother: Ambaro Me'ad Gadid (Cambaro Meecaad Gadiid)
- Religion: Sunni Islam

Farah Guled (Somali: Faarax Guuleed, Arabic: فارح بن جوليد) was a Somali ruler. He was the second Grand Sultan of the Isaaq Sultanate and also a Hajji having completed pilgrimage to Mecca.

== Biography ==
Son of Sultan Guled, he was amongst the first generation of the Ba Ambaro branch of the emerging Guled dynasty, Farah was a member of the Eidagale branch of the Garhajis subclan of Isaaq.

As soon as Sultan Guled's health declined, disputes arose over who would inherit the throne. Duale "Aftaag" (circa 1788–1877), a senior member of the Ba-Canbaro, quickly pushed for his faction's control over the sultanate. Duale, a well-known elder, was the father of notable figures such as Qawdhan Duale (1858–1941), Nur Duale “Dhagacun” (1841–1890), and Mohamud Duale “Candho-eeg” (1839–1907).

Since Roble Guled from the Ba-Cawrala was the eldest son, he was the rightful heir. Duale from the Ba-Canbaro approached Rooble and advised his half-brother to raid and capture livestock belonging to the Ogaden so as to serve the Isaaq sultans and dignitaries who would attend his upcoming coronation, as part of a plot to discredit the would-be sultan and usurp the throne. Roble, unaware of the plot and without objection, agreed to the raid and carried it out. After the dignitaries were made aware of this fact by Duale they removed Roble from the line of succession and offered to crown Jama from the Ba-Saleban, his half brother. Magan, who was close in age to Jama, strongly pushed Jama to take the throne and prevent the powerful Ba-Canbaro from gaining too much power, however Jama promptly declined the offer and suggested that Farah from the Ba-Canbaro, Duale's full brother and son of Guled's fourth wife Ambaro Me'ad Gadid be crowned. The Isaaq subsequently crowned Farah. Feeling betrayed, Magan left in anger.

=== Message to Saqr al Qasimi ===
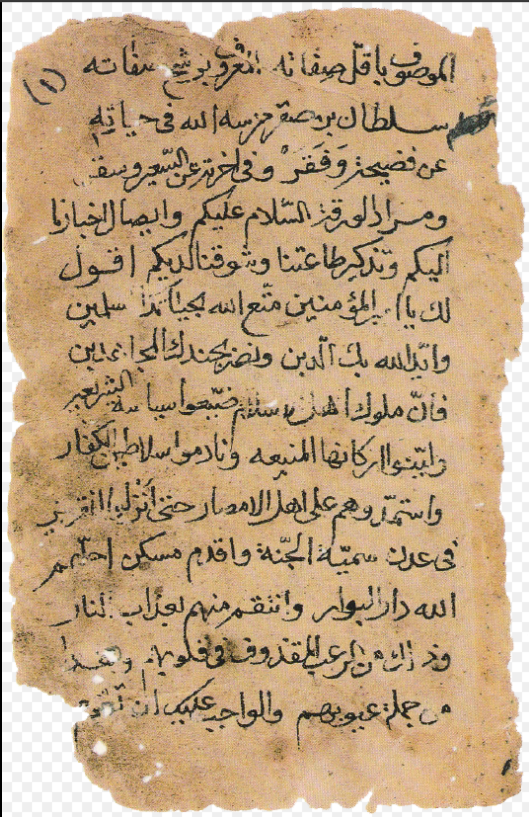
Sultan Farah Guled Letter to Saqr Al Qasimi

When a British vessel named the Mary Anne attempted to dock in Berbera's port in 1825 it was attacked and multiple members of the crew were massacred by the Isaaq. In response the Royal Navy enforced a blockade and some accounts narrate a bombardment of the city. In 1827 two years later the British arrived and extended an offer to relieve the blockade which had halted Berbera's lucrative trade in exchange for indemnity. Following this initial suggestion the Battle of Berbera 1827 would break out. After the Isaaq defeat, 15,000 Spanish dollars was to be paid by the Isaaq leaders for the destruction of the ship and loss of life. In the 1820s the Isaaq Sultan Farah Guled penned a letter to Sultan bin Saqr Al Qasimi of Ras Al Khaimah requesting military assistance and joint religious war against the British. This would not materialize as Sultan Saqr was incapacitated by prior Persian Gulf campaign of 1819 and was unable to send aid to Berbera. Alongside their stronghold in the Persian Gulf & Gulf of Oman the Qasimi were very active both militarily and economically in the Gulf of Aden and were given to plunder and attack ships as far west as the Mocha on the Red Sea. They had numerous commercial ties with the Somalis, leading vessels from Ras Al Khaimah and the Persian Gulf to regularly attend trade fairs in the large ports of Berbera and Zeila and were very familiar with the Isaaq.

=== Death ===
After Farah's coronation, Magan attacked Duale from the Ba-Canbaro (Farah's full brother), stabbing him with a spear and leaving him wounded. Angered by the betrayal, Magan left his clan and sought refuge among the Ishaq 'Arre, a subclan of the Habr Yunis. He and his followers settled near the Hamas (Xamaas) well, along with four descendants of the Ishaq 'Arre.

Years later, Sultan Farah remained on the throne. During this time, he married an Ogaden woman, who later gave birth to Hure Suldan and Warfaa Suldaan—future leaders of the Ba-Ogaadeen subclan. While traveling with an caravan to Berbera, in a place called Hamas, Sultan Farah was spotted by Magan, who still held a grudge. Magan alerted the Ishaq 'Arre warriors and urged them to attack the caravan. During the raid, the Ishaq 'Arre fighters discovered that Sultan Farah was among the travelers. Initially, they hesitated, but Magan taunted their leader Dul-Guduud, accusing him of cowardice. Enraged, Dul-Guduud threw a spear that fatally struck Sultan Farah, killing him on the spot, with his grave remaining in Hamas to this day. He was succeeded by his son Hassan Farah.

== See also ==
- Isaaq
- Deria Sugulleh Ainashe
- Garhajis
- Habr Awal
- Battle of Berbera 1827
