= Rashid Abdillahi =

Sultan of Isaaq (r. 1967–1969

Rashid Abdillahi سلطان رشيد بن عبدالله
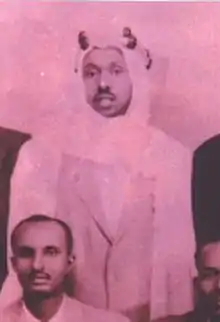
- Sultan Rashid Abdillahi, 1956

Sultan of Isaaq
- Reign: 1967–1969
- Predecessor: Abdillahi Deria
- Successor: Abdiqadir Abdillahi
- Born: 1926; Hargeisa, British Somaliland
- Died: 1969 (aged 42–43); Hargeisa, Somali Republic (now Somaliland)
- Dynasty: Guled Dynasty
- Religion: Sunni Islam

Rashid Abdillahi (Somali: Rashiid Cabdillaahi, Arabic: رشيد بن عبدالله; 1926 – 1969) was the sixth Grand Sultan of the Isaaq Sultanate and reigned from 1967 to 1969, when he was succeeded by his brother Abdiqadir Abdillahi.

== Biography ==
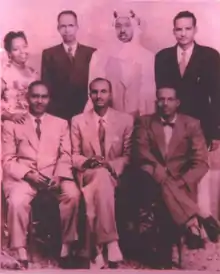
Rashid Abdillahi (third from left in the standing row) pictured with Michael Mariano among other founders of the National United Front in Hargeisa, 1956

Rashid was born in 1926 in Hargeisa and was the eldest son of Sultan Abdillahi Deria. He was fluent in Somali, Arabic and English.

Rashid was active in independence and post-independence politics and accompanied his father Sultan Abdillahi Deria. He was a founding member of the NUF political party in the British Somaliland protectorate. He served as an elected member of the Legislative Assembly for Hargeisa in 1959, where he helped run the Ministries of Local Government, Social Services, Communications, and Works and National Resources along with three other elected members including Michael Mariano to allow said ministries to gain experience.

After unification he served as the counselor for the Somali Embassy in Saudi Arabia from 1960 to 1964.

In 1964 he was elected to the National Assembly of Somalia representing Hargeisa, and was later elected as the Vice President of the National Assembly on 9 March 1966. That same year he would lead a delegation of the Somali National Assembly to Teheran and the 55th World Interparliamentary Conference. In October 1968 he led a delegation of the National Assembly on visits to Jordan and Syria, where he met theSyrian Minister of Information Dr. Habib Haddad.

He died in 1969 aged 43 and was succeeded by his brother Abdiqadir Abdillahi, who returned from exile in Kuwait to be crowned.

Preceded by Abdillahi Deria	Sultan of the Isaaq	Succeeded by Abdiqadir Abdillahi
