= Lafa-Ruug =

- Village
- Location within Sahil, Somaliland Location within Somaliland
- Coordinates: 10°00′33″N 44°46′31″E
- Country: Somaliland
- Region: Sahil
- District: Berbera District

Population (2002)
  - Total: 400
- Time zone: UTC+3 (EAT)

Lafa-Ruug (Lafarug, Lafaruuq, Laferug) is a Village in south-central Sahil region in Somaliland.

== Geography and Vegetation ==
Lafa-Ruug is located in the sublittoral zone below the Golis escarpment, with sandy, Semi-desert-like vegetation. Vachellia tortilis, Dobera glabra, Salvadora persica, Indigofera sparteola, and Commiphora are found.

== Business ==
Livestock ranching is the main business, but because of its location along the main road, some people are engaged in small-scale trades such as restaurants and small stores.

== History ==
=== Until Independence ===
In 1749, Guled Abdi, His coronation took place after the victorious battle of Lafaruug, in which Guled Abdi successfully led the Isaaq and was crowned by the Isaaq clan after defeating the Absame tribes .

In 1939, the British Army established the Somaliland Camel Corps, with headquarters in Lafa-Ruug.

Lafa-Ruug appears in a book published in 1951 in England under the name "Lafarug".

=== After the founding of Somaliland ===
In June 2016, a small altercation developed in Lafa-Ruug, resulting in a shootout that wounded one boy. The youth who fired the gun was arrested.

In May 2019, there was a car accident between Lafa-Ruug and Hamaas that killed 7 people.

In June 2019, Locust infestation occurred in Lafa-Ruug and other areas.

In January 2022, the road connecting Hargeisa and Lafa-Ruug was completed.
