= Mahamed Abdiqadir =

Sultan of Isaaq (r. 1975–2021)

Mahamed Abdiqadir سلطان محمد بن عبدالقادر
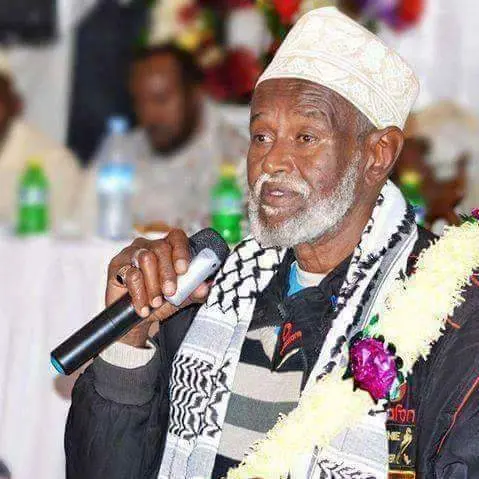
- Photo of Mahamed Abdiqadir

Sultan of Isaaq Grand Sultan of Somaliland
- Reign: 1975 – 12 February 2021
- Predecessor: Abdiqadir Abdillahi
- Successor: Daud Mahamed
- Born: 1948; Hargeisa, British Somaliland
- Died: February 12, 2021 (aged 72–73); Hargeisa, Somaliland
- Dynasty: Guled Dynasty
- Religion: Sunni Islam

Mahamed Abdiqadir (Somali: Suldaan Maxamed Suldaan Cabdiqaadir, Arabic: محمد بن عبدالقادر بن عبدالله; 1948 – 12 February 2021) was the eighth Grand Sultan of the Isaaq Sultanate.

== Biography ==
Sultan Mahamed Abdiqadir was born in 1948 in Hargeisa, British Somaliland. He completed his primary and middle school education in Hargeisa, after which he received further education in Sudan and the Soviet Union where he studied engineering.

Mahamed Abdiqadir died on 12 February 2021 in Hargeisa, due to an illness he was suffering from for months. A state funeral was held and was attended by the President of Somaliland Muse Bihi Abdi and the chairmen of the two opposition parties in the country, as well as high officials and ordinary citizens. The head of the UK's liaison in Somaliland was also among the dignitaries to pay his respects to the late sultan.

Per Isaaq tradition, his son Daud was named as the ninth Isaaq sultan before his body was laid to rest.

Preceded by Abdiqadir Abdillahi	Sultan of the Isaaq	Succeeded by Daud Mahamed
