= House of Guled =

Somali dynasty (1750–1884)

House of Guled ريرْ گُليدْ Reer Guuleed Guled Dynasty
- Parent house: Isaaq
- Country: Isaaq Sultanate; Somaliland
- Origin: Somaliland
- Founded: 1750, 276 years ago
- Founder: Guled Abdi
- Current head: Daud Mahamed
- Final ruler: Deria Hassan
- Titles: Grand Sultan; Sultan
- Deposition: 1884

House of Guled (Somali: Reer Guuleed, Wadaad's writing: ريرْ گُليدْ Arabic: الغوليديين, romanized: al-Ghulīdiyīn) was the ruling house of the Isaaq Sultanate from 1750 to 1884 and is also a subclan in its own right. The family are descendants of the Eidagale sub division of the wider Garhajis and in extension Isaaq clan-family. Although they no longer hold any authority, they are the royal house of Somaliland and are viewed as a favoured symbol in the country. In July 2021, Sultan Mahamed Abdiqadir had a state funeral with nationwide media coverage and was attended by high government officials, including the president of Somaliland; Muse Bihi Abdi and foreign dignitaries.

== Origin ==
The Guled dynasty was established in the middle of the 18th century by Sultan Guled of the Eidagale line of the Garhajis clan. His coronation took place after the victorious battle of Lafaruug in which his father, a religious mullah Abdi Eisa successfully led the Isaaq in battle and defeated the Absame tribes near Berbera where a century earlier the Isaaq clan expanded into. After witnessing his leadership and courage, the Isaaq chiefs recognized his father Abdi who refused the position instead relegating the title to his underage son Guled while the father acted as the regent till the son come of age. Guled was crowned as the first Sultan of the Isaaq clan in July 1750. Sultan Guled thus ruled the Isaaq up until his death in 1808, where he was succeeded by his eldest son Farah full brother of Yuusuf and Du'ale, all from Guled's fourth wife Ambaro Me'ad Gadid.

== List of sultans ==
Name	Lifespan	Reign start	Reign end	Notes	Family	Image
Sultan Guled Abdi: Guled ibn Abdallah; Somali: Guuleed Cabdi		1750	1808			
Sultan Farah Guled: Farah ibn Guled; Somali: Faarax Guuleed		1808	1845	Partook in the British attack on Berbera		
Sultan Hassan Farah: Hassan ibn Farah; Somali: Xasan Faarax		1845	1870	Mediated the conflict between the Ayal Ahmed and Ayal Yunis branches of the Habr Awal		
Sultan Deria Hassan: Deria ibn Hassan; Somali: Diiriye Xasan		1870	1939	Establishment of British Somaliland protectorate in 1884		
Sultan Abdillahi Deria: Abdallah ibn Deria; Somali: Cabdillaahi Diiriye		1939	1967			
Sultan Rashid Abdillahi: Rashid ibn Abdallah; Somali: Rashiid Cabdillaahi		1967	1969			
Sultan Abdiqadir Abdillahi: Abdulqadir ibn Abdallah; Somali: Cabdiqaadir Cabdillaahi		1969	1975			
Sultan Mahamed Abdiqadir: Muhammad ibn Abdulqadir; Somali: Maxamed Cabdiqaadir		1975	2021			
Sultan Daud Mahamed: Da'ud ibn Muhammad; Somali: Daa'uud Maxamed		2021	Ongoing			

== Family tree ==
- Guled Abdi (1st Sultan: 1750–1808)
  - Farah Guled (Prince)
  - Jama Guled (Prince)
  - Roble Guled (Prince)
  - Egal Guled (Prince)
  - Gatah Guled (Prince)
  - Dualeh Guled (Prince)
  - Yusuf Guled(Prince)
  - Ali Guled (Prince)
  - Diriye Guled (Prince)
  - Abdi Guled (Prince)
  - Magan Guled (Prince)
  - Farah Guled (2nd Sultan: 1808–1845)
    - Hassan Farah (3rd Sultan: 1845–1870)
      - Diriye Hassan (4th Sultan: 1870–1939)
        - Abdillahi Diriye (5th Sultan: 1937–1937)
          - Rashid Abdillahi (6th Sultan: 1967–1969)
          - Abdiqadir Abdillahi (7th Sultan: 1969–1975)
            - Mohamed Abdiqadir (8th Sultan: 1975–2021)
              - Daud Mohamed (9th Sultan: 2021–Present)
