= Guled Abdi (sultan) =

Sultan of the Isaaq Sultanate

Guled Abdi Ciise سلطان جوليد بن عبدي

Sultan of Isaaq
- Reign: 1750–1808
- Coronation: July 1750
- Predecessor: Position established Abdi Eissa (Leader) as Traditional Chief of the Isaaq
- Successor: Farah Guled
- Dynasty: Guled Dynasty

Guled Abdi Eisse Dhamal Adan (Somali: Guuleed Cabdi, Arabic: جوليد بن عبدي) was a Somali ruler. He was the first Sultan of the Isaaq Sultanate and his numerous offspring would form the Rer Guled and continue to lead after his death.

== Biography ==
The Isaaq Sultanate, established in the early 18th century, remains a relevant institution to this day, having endured through centuries of change, including the British Empire’s rule over Somaliland.

Founded by Sultan Guled, son of Chief Abdi Chief Eisse Dhamal of the Eidangale clan (Aka Daud Ismail), the sultanate originated from the wealthiest family of its time, the Eisse Dhamal. Sultan Guled was not only a leader but also a formidable warrior who impressed everyone with his courage and skill in the Battle of Lafaruug, where his father led the Isaaq to victory against the Absame tribes.

Initially, the Isaaq chiefs sought to crown his uncle, Chief Libaan Eisse or his father Chief Abdi Eisse, recognizing his wealth, bravery, and influence. However, Chief Libaan Eisse, content with his prosperity and livestock, declined the title and instead ensured that his nephew Guled was crowned as the first Grand Sultan of the Isaaq.

Sultan Guled ruled from 1750 until his passing in the early 19th century, setting the foundation for a sultanate that withstood colonial rule and continues to hold cultural and historical significance in Somaliland today. He was succeeded by his son Farah.

Preceded by Guled Abdi	Isaaq Sultanate	Succeeded by Farah Guled

== See also ==
- Garhajis
- Eidagale
- Habar Yoonis
- Habr Awal
- Habr Je'lo
- Arap
- Ayub
- Isaaq
