= Isaaq =

Somali clan family

Isaaq Reer Sheekh Isxaaq
- Somali clan
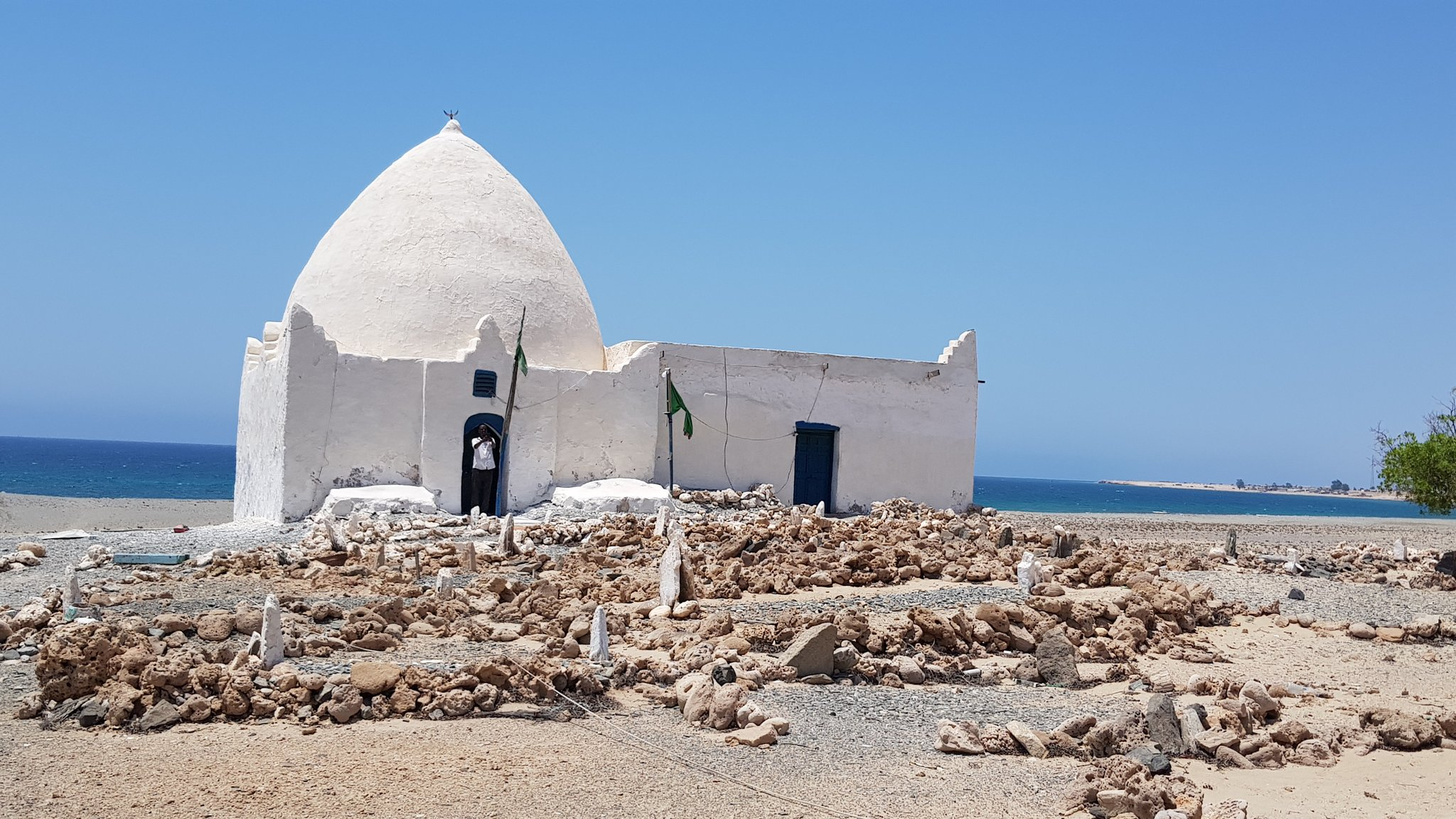
- The tomb of Ishaaq, the father of the Isaaq clan, in Maydh
- Ethnicity: Somali
- Location: Somaliland, Ethiopia, and Djibouti
- Descended from: Sheikh Ishaaq bin Ahmed
- Population: 3-4 million
- Branches: Habr Magaadle: Abdirahman; Isa Musa; Sa'ad Musa; Haba Musa; Muhammed; Ismail; Habr Yunis; Eidagale; Ayub; Habr Habuusheed: Muse; Ibrahim; Muhammed; Ahmed
- Language: Somali
- Religion: Sunni Islam

The Isaaq (Somali: Reer Sheekh Isxaaq) is a major Somali clan. It is one of the largest Somali clan families in the Horn of Africa, with a large and densely populated traditional territory. The Isaaq people claim in a traditional legend to have descended from Sheikh Ishaaq bin Ahmed, an Islamic scholar who purportedly travelled to Somaliland in the 12th or 13th century and married two women; one from the local Dir clan. He is said to have sired eight sons who are the common ancestors of the clans of the Isaaq clan-family. He remained in Maydh until his death.

== Overview ==
Somali genealogical tradition places the origin of the Isaaq tribe in the 12th or 13th century with the alleged arrival of the Sheikh Ishaaq Bin Ahmed (Sheikh Ishaaq) from Arabia. According to oral lore, Sheikh Ishaaq settled in the coastal town of Maydh in modern-day northeastern Somaliland. Hence, Sheikh Ishaaq married two local women in Somaliland, which left him with eight. Despite these traditions, scholars have noted their clear Cushitic ethnic and linguistic origins.

There are also numerous existing hagiographies in Arabic which describe Sheikh Ishaaq's travels, works and overall life in modern Somaliland, as well as his movements in Arabia before his arrival. Besides historical sources, one of the more recent printed biographies of Sheikh Ishaaq is the Amjaad of Sheikh Husseen bin Ahmed Darwiish al-Isaaqi as-Soomaali, which was printed in Aden in 1955.

Sheikh Ishaaq's tomb is in Maydh, and is the scene of frequent pilgrimages. Sheikh Ishaaq's mawlid (birthday) is also celebrated every Thursday with a public reading of his manaaqib (a collection of glorious deeds). His Siyaara or pilgrimage is performed annually both within Somaliland and in the diaspora particularly in the Middle East among Isaaq expatriates.

The dialect of the Somali language that the Isaaq speak has the highest prestige of any other Somali dialect.

== Distribution ==
The Isaaq Sultanate banner derived from an Adal Sultanate flag with the Shahada

The Isaaq are estimated to number 3-4 million according to a 2015 estimate, and roughly comprise around 22% of all Somalis.

The Isaaq have a very wide and densely populated traditional territory and make up 80% of Somaliland's population, and live in all of its six regions (Awdal, Marodi Jeh, Togdheer, Sahil, Sanaag and Sool). The Isaaq have large settlements in the Somali Region of Ethiopia, mainly on the eastern side of Somali Region also known as the Hawd and formerly Reserve Area which is mainly inhabited by the Isaaq residents. A subclan of the Habr Yunis, the Damal Muse (also known as the Dir Rooble), also inhabit the Mudug region of Somalia. The Habarnoosa, a clan of the Hadiya people in the Hadiya Zone claim descent from the Habr Yunis subclan of Isaaq. The Isaaqs also have large settlements in Naivasha, Kenya, where the Ishaakia make up a large percentage of the Kenyan population, and in Djibouti, where the Isaaq account for 20% of Djibouti's population.

The Isaaq tribe are the largest group in Somaliland. The populations of five largest cities in Somaliland – Hargeisa, Burao, Berbera, Erigavo and Gabiley – are all predominantly Isaaq and historically native to Zeila. They exclusively dominate the Marodi Jeh region, and the Togdheer region, and form a majority of the population inhabiting the western and central areas of Sanaag region, including the regional capital Erigavo. The Isaaq also have a large presence in the western and northern parts of Sool region as well, with Habr Je'lo sub-clan of Isaaq living in the Aynabo district whilst the Habr Yunis subclan of Garhajis lives in the eastern part of Xudun district and the very western part of Las Anod district. They also live in the northeast of the Awdal region, with Saad Muse sub-clan being centered around Lughaya and its environs. The Arap live Somalia Bakool Rabdhure District the live also Fafan Zone and Baligubadle.

The Isaaq also has a sizable diaspora around the world, mainly residing in Western Europe, the Middle East, North America, and several other African countries. The Isaaq were among the first Somalis to arrive in the United Kingdom in the 1880s, and have since then formed large communities across the country, especially in Cardiff, Sheffield, Bristol and eastern London boroughs like Tower Hamlets and Newham. In Canada the Isaaq form large communities in the North York and Scarborough districts of Toronto.

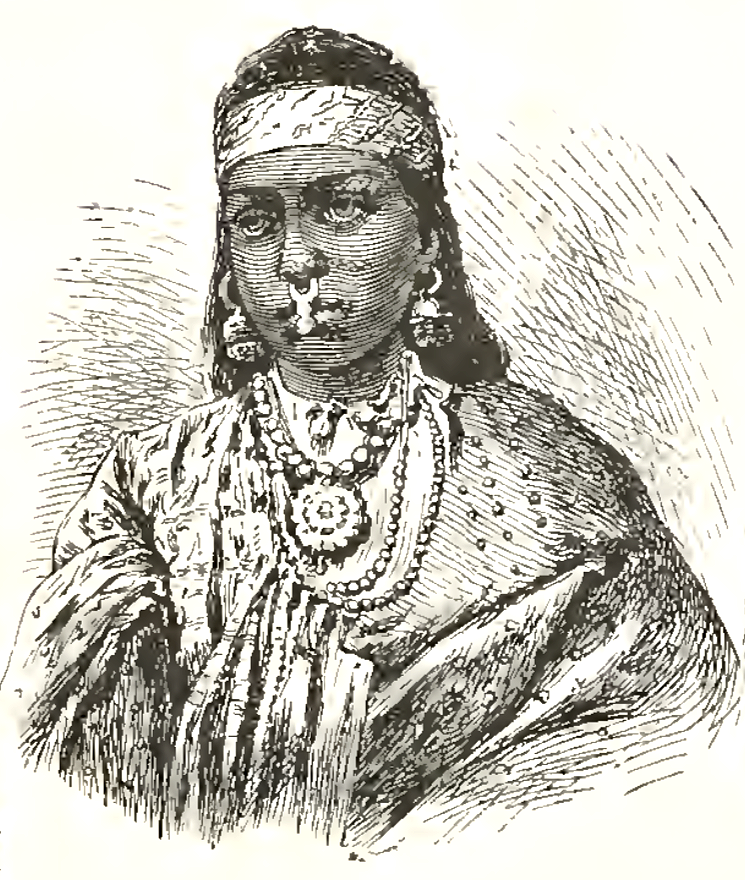
An illustration depicting a Somali woman of the Isaaq clan published in Bilder-Atlas in 1870

== History ==
=== Medieval ===
As the Isaaq grew in size and numbers during the 12th century, the clan-family migrated and spread from their core area in Mait (Maydh) and the wider Sanaag region in a southwestward expansion over a wide portion of present-day Somaliland by the 15th and 16th centuries. By the 1300s the Isaaq clans united to defend their inhabited territories and resources during clan conflicts against migrating clans.

The Isaaq played a prominent role in the Ethiopian-Adal War (1529–1543, referred to as the "Conquest of Abyssinia") in the army of Ahmad ibn Ibrahim al-Ghazi, The Habr Magadle division (Ayoub, Garhajis, Habr Awal and Arap) of the Isaaq were mentioned in chronicles of that war written by Shihab Al-Din Ahmad Al-Gizany known as Futuh al-Habasha.

Habr Awal (left) and Habr Garhajis (right) chiefs photographed in Hargeisa, Somaliland

I. M. Lewis states:

The Marrehan and the Habr Magadle [Magādi] also play a very prominent role (...) The text refers to two Ahmads's with the nickname 'Left-handed'. One is regularly presented as 'Ahmad Guray, the Somali' (...) identified as Ahmad Guray Xuseyn, chief of the Habr Magadle. Another reference, however, appears to link the Habr Magadle with the Marrehan. The other Ahmad is simply referred to as 'Imam Ahmad' or simply the 'Imam'.This Ahmad is not qualified by the adjective Somali (...) The two Ahmad's have been conflated into one figure, the heroic Ahmed Guray (...)

Some descendants of the Habr Yunis knights who participated in the conquest still inhabit west of Harar near Hirna. Ulrich Braukämper in A History of the Hadiyya in Southern Ethiopia states :

"Amongst the troops recruited from the eastern parts of the Horn of Africa for the jihad, warriors of Somali descent occasionally remained in the conquered territories of the west, settling in the principalities of Hadiyya, Sarha, and Bale. In present-day Arsi land, there are still recollections of these Ogadeen peoples, who are sometimes identifiable by their ethnic origin, such as the Habr Yunis and Garjeeda. Maintaining bonds of interethnic clan relations with the Somali-inhabited regions, the Habr Yunis from the vicinity of Hirna in Carcar joined the westward exodus during the time of Amir Nur and occupied pasturelands east of Lake Zay."

The troops that were recruited from the eastern Horn of Africa for the conquest such as Somali soldiers, sometimes remained in the newly conquered western territories, like Hadiya, Sharkha, and Bale. The legacy of these people from the Ogaden remained in Arsi territory, identifiable by their ethnic origins, such as the Habr Yonis and Garjeeda clans. The Habr Yonis, originated from Hirna in the Chercher region, migrated westward during Nur's reign and settled east of Lake Zway, in areas suitable for livestock breeding whilst the Gajeeda clan spread among the Ittuu and Arsi. The Habarnosa claim descent from the Habr Yonis. Another troop of Nur's army reached the Gurage Mountains, where the descendants of these troops retained the name Barbare, believed to be derived from the Somali port of Berbera. This information was affirmed by the Barbare people from the Gurage Zone.

Berbera, along with Zeila, were the two most important ports situated inside the Adal Sultanate, and they provided vital political and commercial links with the wider Islamic World:

To Adea belongs a very good Port, call’d Barraboa, whoſe chief City is Arat, obeys a King, who is an enemy to the Abiſſines. Barraboa and Zeila are places of great Trade, by reaſon of the conveniency of their Ports, towards the entry into the Red-Sea.	To Adel belongs a very good port, called Barbara, whose chief city is Harar, obeys a King, who is an enemy to the Abyssinians. Barbara and Zeila are places of great trade, by reason of the conveniency of their ports, towards the entry into the Red Sea.

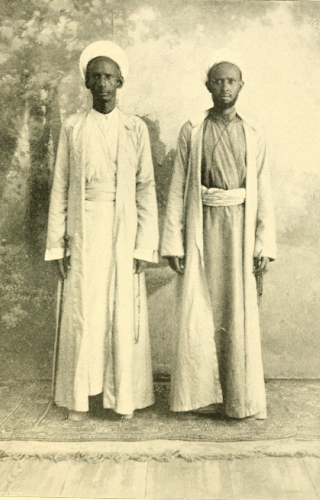
Dervish Commander Haji Sudi on the left with his brother-in-law Duale Idris (1892)

=== Early modern ===
Long after the collapse of the Adal Sultanate, the Isaaq established successor states, the Isaaq Sultanate and the Habr Yunis Sultanate. These two Sultanates possessed some of the organs and trappings of a traditional integrated state: a functioning bureaucracy, regular taxation in the form of livestock, as well as an army (chiefly consisting of mounted light cavalry). These sultanates also maintained written records of their activities, which still exist. The Isaaq Sultanate ruled parts of the Horn of Africa during the 18th and 19th centuries and spanned the territories of the Isaaq clan in modern-day Somaliland and the Haud region in Somali Galbeed. The sultanate was governed by the Rer Guled branch of the Eidagale clan and is considered the pre-colonial predecessor to the modern Republic of Somaliland.

The modern Guled Dynasty of the Isaaq Sultanate was established in the middle of the 18th century by Sultan Guled of the Eidagale line of the Garhajis clan. His coronation took place after the victorious battle of Lafaruug in which his father, a religious mullah Abdi Eisa successfully led the Isaaq in battle and defeated the Absame tribes near Berbera where a century earlier the Isaaq clan expanded into. After witnessing his leadership and courage, the Isaaq chiefs recognized his father Abdi who refused the position instead relegating the title to his underage son Guled while the father acted as the regent till the son come of age. Guled was crowned as the first Sultan of the Isaaq clan in July 1750. Sultan Guled thus ruled the Isaaq up until his death in 1839, where he was succeeded by his eldest son Farah full brother of Yuusuf and Du'ale, all from Guled's fourth wife Ambaro Me'ad Gadid.

=== Anglo-Ishaaq conflicts ===
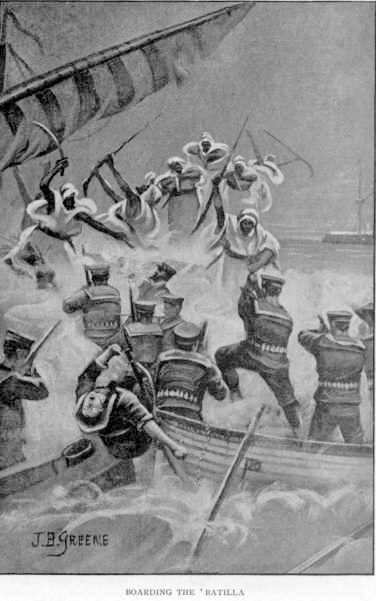
Ishaaq soldiers boarding a British batilla

From 1825 to 1884, the Isaaq and British Empire had numerous conflicts, battles, and skirmishes, known as the Anglo-Isaaq conflicts. The first of these conflicts occurred in 1825, when a British ship named the Mary Anne was attacked, sacked, and plundered by Isaaq forces in the port city of Berbera. The attack led to a British blockade of the city and subsequent negotiations with the Sultanate. Further incidents occurred in the 1850s, notably with the attack on British exploring expeditions and the Blockade of Berbera (1855)

These dangers and the costs put off new British expeditions in the region for a while.

By the early 1880s, the Isaaq Sultanate had been reduced to the Ciidangale confederation with only the Eidagale, and Ishaaq Arreh subclan of the Habr Yunis remaining. In 1884–1886 the British signed treaties with the coastal sub-clans and had not yet penetrated the interior in any significant way. Sultan Deria Hassan remained de facto master of Hargeisa and its environs.

=== Modern ===
==== Dervish movement ====
The Isaaq also played a major role in the Dervish movement, with Sultan Nur Aman of the Habr Yunis being fundamental in the inception of the movement. Sultan Nur was the principle agitator that rallied the dervish behind his anti-French Catholic Mission campaign that would become the cause of the dervish uprise. Haji Sudi of the Habr Je'lo was the highest ranking Dervish after Mohammed Abdullah Hassan, he died valiantly defending the Taleh fort during the RAF bombing campaign. The Isaaq tribes most well known for joining the Dervish movement were from the eastern tribes such as the Habr Yunis and Habr Je'lo. These two sub-tribes were able to purchase advanced weapons and successfully resist both British Empire and Ethiopian Empire for many years. The fourth Isaaq Grand Sultan Deria Hassan exchanged letters with Muhammad Abdullah Hassan in the first year of the movement's foundation, with the sultan inciting an insurrection in Hargeisa in 1900 as well as supplying the Mullah with vital information.

==== Post-colonial ====
The Isaaq people along with other northern Somali tribes were under British Somaliland protectorate administration from 1884 to 1960. On gaining independence, the Somaliland protectorate decided to form a union with Italian Somalia. The Isaaq clan spearheaded the greater Somalia quest from 1960 to 1991.

The Isaaq played a massive role to push for unification and independence. They selected to join the Trust Territory of Somaliland to form the Somali Republic. During the civilian government from 1960 to 1969, they held dominant positions. Jama Mohamed Ghalib (1960–4) and Ahmed Mohamed Obsiye (1964–6), both belonging to the Isaaq clan, served as the president of the National Assembly, while a notable Isaaq member named Muhammad Haji Ibrahim Egal served as the prime minister of Somalia from 1967 to 1969. Furthermore, when English became one of the official languages, the ministries of Foreign Trade, Foreign Affairs, Education, and Information were mainly held by the Isaaq members. They were still powerful in the early years of the military dictatorship (1969–91). However, from the late 1970s, Marehan became politically powerful under the leadership of the military dictator Siad Barre. The Isaaq began to face political and economic marginalization and in response, they organized the Somali National Movement to over his regime. Thus the Somaliland War of Independence began and this struggle movement forced the Isaaq clan to become a victim to a genocidal campaign by Siad Barre's troops (which also included armed Somali refugees from Ethiopia); the death toll has been estimated to be between 50,000 and 250,000. After the collapse of the Somali Democratic Republic in 1991 the Isaaq-dominated Somaliland declared independence from Somalia as a separate nation.

== Mercantilism ==
Historically (and presently to a degree), the wider Isaaq clan were relatively more disposed to trade than their tribal counterparts due in part to their centuries-old trade links with the Arabian Peninsula. In view of this imbalance in mercantile experience, other major Somali clans tended to resort to tribal slang terms such as "iidoor", an enviable pejorative roughly meaning trader/exchanger:

Somalis bandied about numerous stereotypes of clan behavior that mirrored these emerging social inequalities. The pejorative slang terms iidoor or kabadhe iidoora (loosely meaning "exchange") reflect Somali disdain for the go-between, the person who amasses wealth through persistence and mercantile skills without firm commitments to anyone else. As the Isaaq became more international and cosmopolitan, their commercial success and achievement ideology aroused suspicion and jealousy, notably among rural Darod who disliked Isaaq self-confidence and made them the target of stereotypes.

The Habr Awal clan of the Isaaq have a rich mercantile history largely due to their possession of the major Somali port of Berbera, which was the chief port and settlement of Habr Awal clan during the early modern period. The clan had strong ties to the Emirate of Harar and Emirs would hold Habr Awal merchants in their court with high esteem with Richard Burton noting their influence in Emir Ahmad III ibn Abu Bakr's court and discussions with the Vizier Mohammed. The Habr Awal merchants had extensive trade relations with Arab and Indian merchants from Arabia and the Indian subcontinent respectively, and also conducted trade missions on their own vessels to the Arabian ports. Berbera, in addition to Berbera being described as “the freest port in the world, and the most important trading place on the whole Arabian Gulf, was also the main marketplace in the entire Somali seaboard for various goods procured from the interior, such as livestock, coffee, frankincense, myrrh, acacia gum, saffron, feathers, wax, ghee, hide (skin), gold and ivory.

The Habr Je'lo clan of the Isaaq derived a large supply of frankincense from the trees south in the mountains near port town of Heis. This trade was lucrative and with gum and skins being traded in high quantity, Arab and Indian merchants would visit Habr Je'lo ports early in the season to get these goods cheaper than at Berbera or Zeyla before continuing westwards along the Somali coast. Heis, in addition to being a leading exporter of tanned skins also exported a large quantity of skins and sheep to Aden as well as imported a significant amount of goods from both the Arabian coast and western Somali ports, reaching nearly 2 million rupees by 1903. The Habr Je’lo coastal settlements and ports, stretching from near Siyara in the west to Heis (Xiis) in the east, were important to trade and communication with the Somali interior, with Kurrum (Karin), the principle Habr Je’lo port, being a major market for livestock and frankincense procured from the interior, and was a favorite for livestock traders due to the close proximity of the port to Aden. The Buur Dhaab range in Sool region has also historically acted as a junction for trade caravans coming from the east on their way to Berbera port, passing through the Laba Gardai or Bah Lardis pass located within the range. The powerful Habr Je'lo clan has historically acted as the guardians of this pass, receiving dues in exchange for guaranteed safety through Buur Dhaab:

The Habr Toljaala are a powerful tribe, and make it a point of honour that caravans shall have safe passage through their country, and they receive a part of the dues for this purpose.

Starting in the middle of the 19th century, Isaaq clans became more connected to the European commercial world as historic ties between southern Somali towns along the Benadir coast with India and Oman were being reoriented southward toward Zanzibar. Isaaq trade and migration patterns were skewed by British imperial control of Aden more toward Europe and colonies like India, Egypt, and the Sudan, enabling the Isaaq to maintain a variety of contacts across the British Empire. The Isaaq clan-family became the first Somalis to actually reside abroad, in western Europe or its colonial outposts, where they socialized in two different cultures.

The Isaaq affinity for mercantilism was not lost on the sole president and dictator of the Somali Democratic Republic (1969–1991), Siad Barre, who disliked the Isaaq clan-family due to their financial independence, thus making it harder to control them:

Siyaad had a deep and personal dislike for the clan. The real reasons can only be guessed at, but in part it was due to his inability to control them. As accomplished business operatives, they had built a society that was not dependent on government largesse. The Isaaq had traditional trade relationships with the nations of the Arabian Peninsula that continued despite the attempts of the government to center all economic activity in Mogadishu. Siyaad did what he could, however, and Isaaq traders were forced to make the long trip to Mogadishu for permits and licenses.

Nevertheless, in the 1970s and 1980s, nearly all of the livestock exports went out through the port of Berbera via Isaaq livestock traders, with the towns of Burao and Yirowe in the interior being home to the largest livestock markets in the Horn of Africa. The entire livestock exports accounted to upwards of 90% of the Somali Republic's entire export figures in a given year, and Berbera's exports alone provided over 75% of the nation's recorded foreign currency income at the time.

== Commercialising Coffee ==
Historically, the Isaaq clans, such as the Habr Awal, were established along the coast from Zeila to Berbera. European explorers and officials, including Richard Burton, Philipp Paulitschke, and Lieutenant C. J. Cruttenden, documented the presence of the Isaaq from Zeila and Berbera this seaboard and their involvement in regional commerce. In particular, the clans played a significant role in the coffee trade, serving as intermediaries between the Ethiopian hinterland and the Arabian ports of Mocha and Aden. Through caravan routes that connected Harar to the Somali coast, Isaaq merchants facilitated the export of coffee, alongside livestock, gums, and other commodities, thereby making Berbera and Zeila important centers of Red Sea trade.

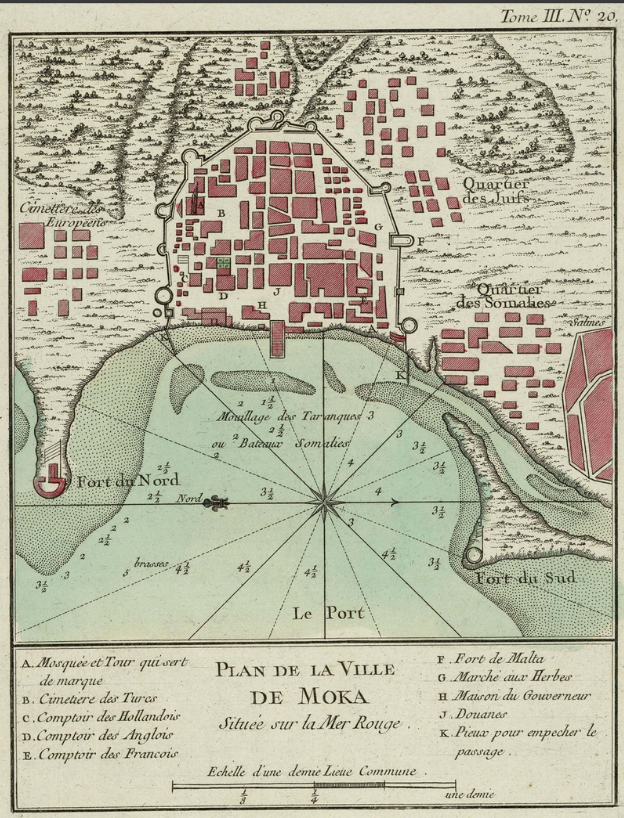
18th century French plan of Mocha, Yemen. The Somali, Jewish and European quarters are located outside the citadel. The Dutch, English, Turkish and French trading posts are inside the city walls.

16th-century Islamic scholar Ibn Hajar al-Haytami notes in his writings that a beverage called qahwa developed from a tree in the Zeila region located in the Horn of Africa. Coffee was first exported from Ethiopia to Yemen by Somali merchants from Berbera and Zeila in modern-day Somaliland, which was procured from Harar and the Abyssinian interior. According to Captain Haines, who was the colonial administrator of Aden (1839–1854), Mokha historically imported up to two-thirds of its coffee from Berbera-based merchants before the coffee trade of Mokha was captured by British-controlled Aden in the 19th century. After that, much of the Ethiopian coffee was exported to Aden via Berbera.

Mocha historically imported up to two-thirds of their coffee from Berbera-based merchants before the coffee trade of Mocha was captured by British-controlled Aden in the 19th century. Thereafter, much of the Ethiopian coffee was exported to Aden via Berbera.One contemporary account highlights Berbera's growing commercial importance:

“Berbera not only supplies Aden with horned cattle and sheep to a very large extent, but the trade between Africa and Aden is steadily increasing greatly every year. In the article of coffee alone there is considerable export, and ‘Berbera’ coffee stands in the Bombay market now before Mocha. The coffee shipped at Berbera comes from far in the interior, from Hurrar, Abyssinia, and Kaffa. It will be to the advantage of all that the trade should come to Aden through one port, and Berbera is the only place on the coast there that has a protected port, where vessels can lie in smooth water.”

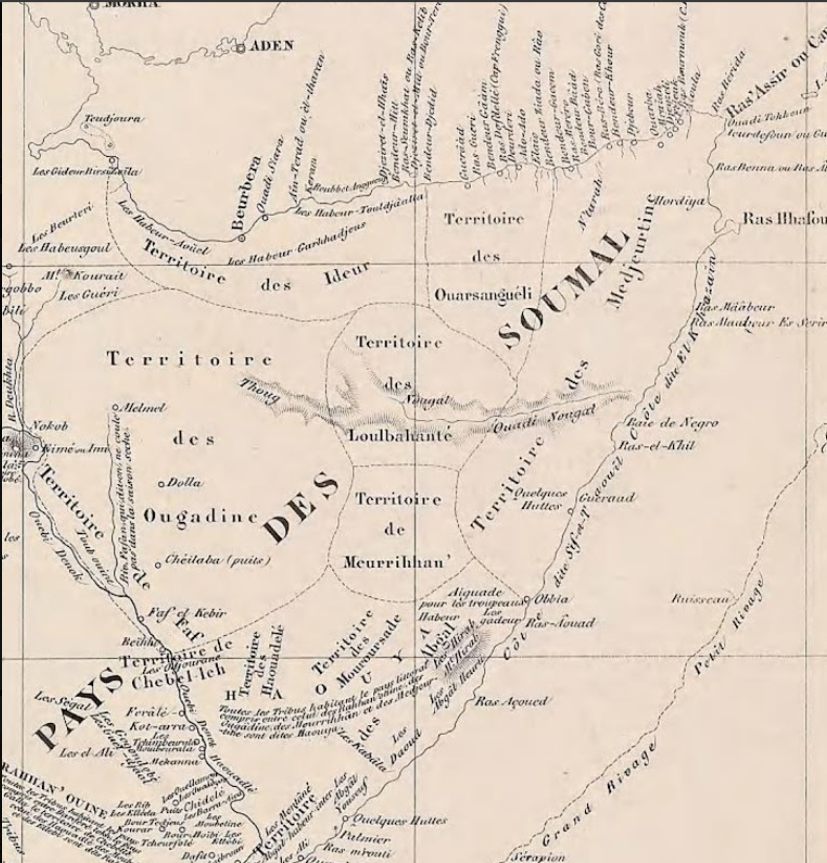
19th Century Territorial Distribution of the Isaaq Clans

In the 19th century, Sharmarke Ali Saleh, the ruler of Zeila and later Berbera, played a central role in expanding Red Sea commerce. Under his administration, Zeila became a key outlet for Abyssinian goods, including large quantities of coffee exported through its port to Arabian markets. His control over Zeila and Berbera helped consolidate the position of these coastal towns as hubs in the regional coffee trade whilst exporting 300 tonnes of Coffee to the sub Indian continent and also distributed to as far as the Persian Gulf.

"Out of the twenty local vessels docked in Zeila ten were owned by Sharmarke himself, with two of the ships being 'large trading dhows which convey yearly, about 300 tons of coffee and other goods' to Bombay." – Richard Burton, First Footsteps in East Africa

=== Modern Coffee Trade ===
Although the traditional caravan coffee routes declined, Somali involvement in the trade did not disappear. In 1942, Somali entrepreneur Mohammed Abdillahi Ogsadey, together with his brothers, founded the M.A.O. Corporation, the first company to export coffee from Africa. It later grew into one of the largest coffee import and export enterprises in East Africa. Based in Harar, the company was widely recognized through its brand Harar Horse. Ogsadey, who began his career with modest work before entering the trade, rose to become one of the wealthiest men in Ethiopia during the 1980s. Coffee cultivation in Harar has continued into the present, with many families still practicing traditional methods.

== Isaaq sub-clans ==
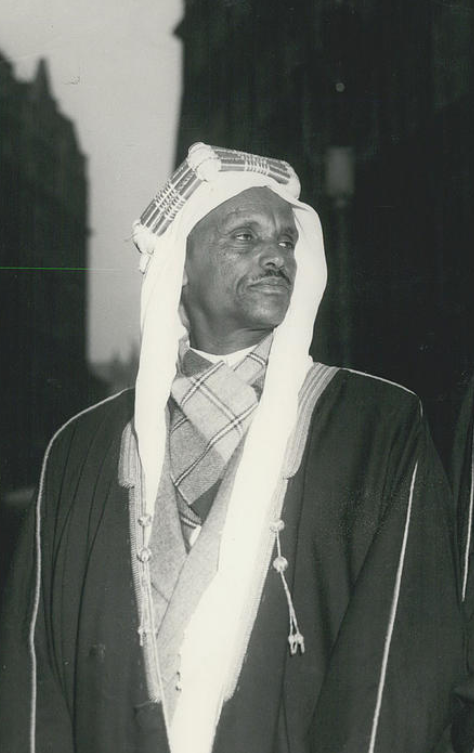
Sultan Abdurahman Deria of the Sa'ad Musa Isaaq in London 1955

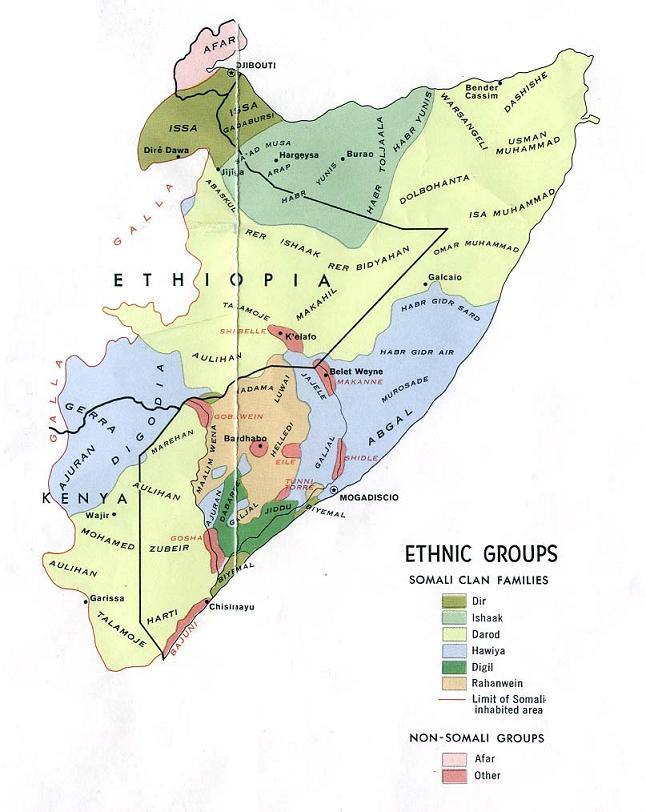
Somali clan map

In the Isaaq clan, component sub-clans are divided into two uterine divisions, as shown in the genealogy. The first division is between those lineages descended from sons of Sheikh Ishaaq by a Harari woman – the Habr Habuusheed – and those descended from sons of Sheikh Ishaaq by a Somali woman of the Magaadle sub-tribe of the Dir – the Habr Magaadle. Indeed, most of the largest subtribes of the tribal-ethnic group are in fact uterine alliances hence the matronymic "Habr" which in archaic Somali means "mother". This is illustrated in the following clan structure.

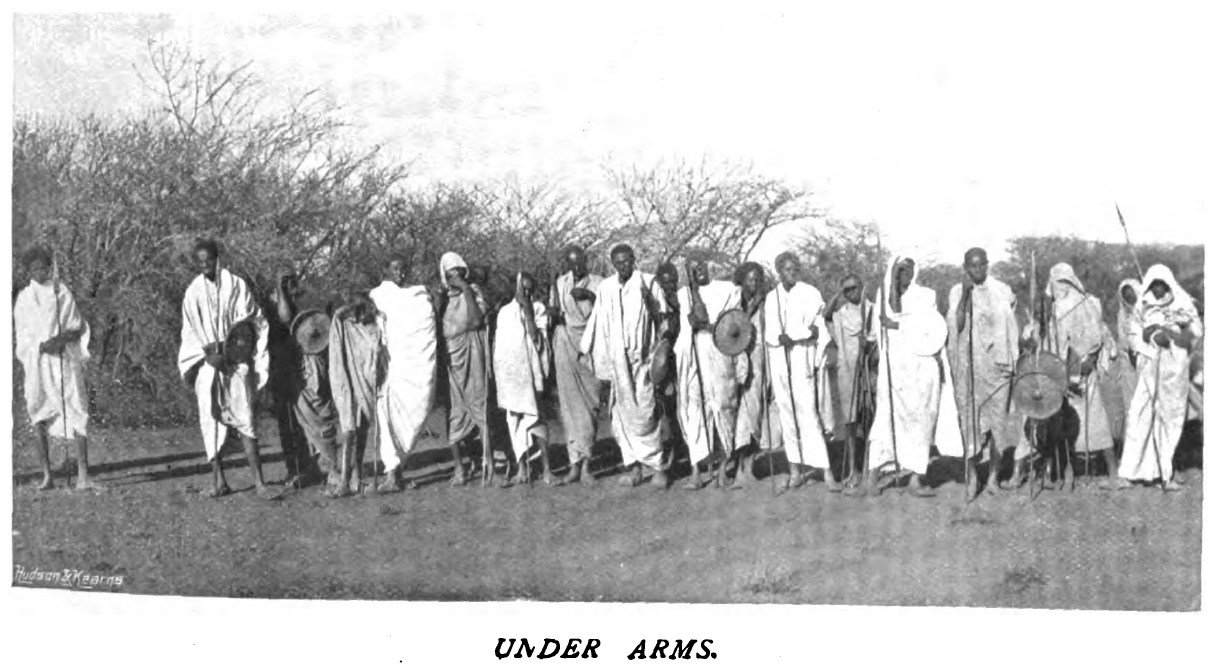
Warriors of the Habr Awal sub clan

A. Habr Magaadle

- Abdirahman (Habr Awal)
  - Isa Musa
  - Sa'ad Musa
  - Baha Musa
- Muhammad (Arap)
  - Muuse celi Barsuug
  - Maxamed celi
  - Subeer celi
- Ayub
- Ismail (Habr Garhajis)
  - Habr Yunis
  - Eidagale

B. Habr Habuusheed

- Ahmed (Tol Je’lo)
- Muuse (Habr Je'lo)
  - Mohamed Abokor
  - Musa Abokor
- Ibrahiim (Sanbuur)
- Muhammad (‘Ibraan)

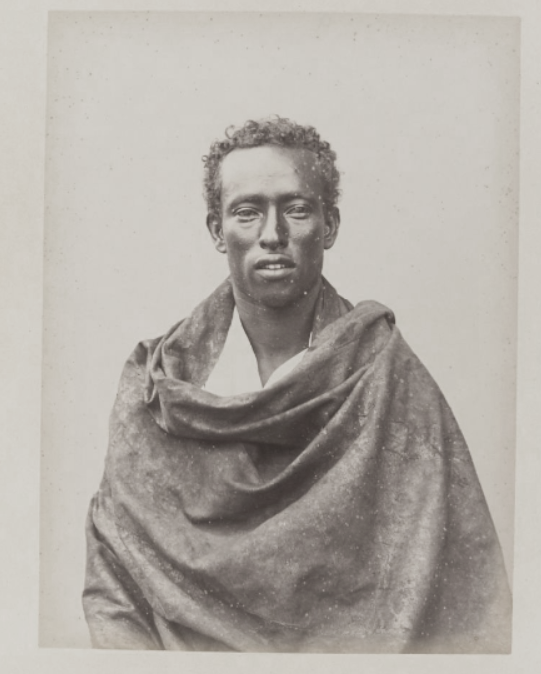
Dualeh Abdi of the Musa Abokor Habr Je'lo tribe photographed in 1890

There is clear agreement on the tribe and sub-tribe structures that has not changed for a long time. The oldest recorded genealogy of a Somali in Western literature was by Sir Richard Burton in the mid–19th century regarding his Isaaq (Habr Yunis) host and the governor of Zeila, Sharmarke Ali Saleh

The following listing is taken from the World Bank's Conflict in Somalia: Drivers and Dynamics from 2005 and the United Kingdom's Home Office publication, Somalia Assessment 2001.

- Isaaq
  - Habr Awal
    - Issa Musa
    - Sa'ad Musa
  - Arap
    - Muuse celi Barsuug
    - Maxamed celi
    - Subeer celi
  - Ayub
  - Garhajis
    - Habr Yunis
    - Eidagale
  - Habr Je'lo
    - Muuse Abokor
    - Mohamed Abokor
    - Samane Abokor
  - Tol Je'lo
  - Sanbuur
  - Imraan

Stereotypes among the Isaaq subtribes go a long way to explaining each subtribes role in Somaliland. In one exemplified folklore tale, Sheikh Ishaaq's three eldest sons split their father's inheritance among themselves. Garhajis receives his imama, a symbol of leadership; Awal receives the sheikh's wealth; and Ahmed (Tolja'ele) inherits his sword. The story is intended to depict the Garhajis's proclivity for politics, the Habr Awal's mercantile prowess, and the Habr Je'lo's bellicosity.

To strengthen these tribal stereotypes, historical anecdotes have been used: The Garhajis were dominant leaders before and during the colonial period, and thus acquired intellectual and political superiority; Habr Awal dominance of the trade via Djibouti and Berbera is practically uncontested; and Habr Je’lo military prowess is cited in accounts of previous conflicts.

== Notable figures ==
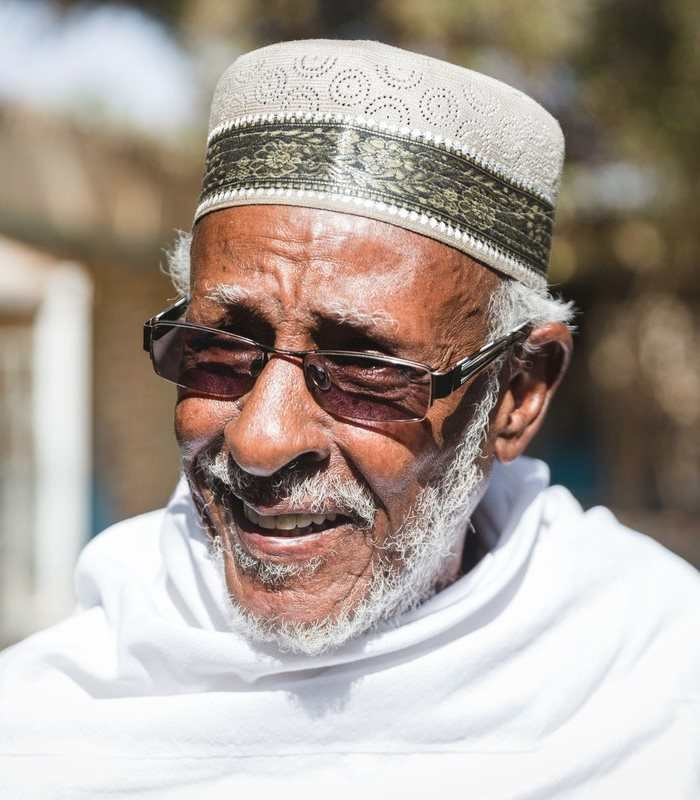
Hadraawi, notable contemporary Somali poet

=== Royalty and rulers ===
- Deria Hassan, 4th Grand Sultan of the Isaaq
- Abdillahi Deria, 5th Grand Sultan of the Isaaq
- Guled Abdi, 1st Grand Sultan of the Isaaq
- Awad Deria, 5th Sultan of the Habr Yunis
- Deria Sugulleh Ainashe, 2nd Sultan of the Habr Yunis
- Hersi Aman, 3rd Sultan of the Habr Yunis
- Sharmarke Ali Saleh, major trader and governor of Berbera, Zeila and Tadjoura
- Farah Guled, 2nd Grand Sultan of the Isaaq
- Sultan Mohamed Sultan Farah - Sultan of the Arap clan and commander of the SNM's 10th division
- Sultan Abdulrahman Deria, Sultan of the Habr Awal clan
- Sultan Abdillahi Deria, prominent anti-colonial figure and 5th Grand Sultan of the Isaaq
- Mahamed Abdiqadir – 8th Grand Sultan of the Isaaq
- Madar Hersi, 7th Sultan of the Habr Yunis Sultanate
- Daud Mahamed, 9th and current Grand Sultan of the Isaaq
- Sultan Osman Sultan Ali Koshin, the current Grand sultan of the Issa Musse clans

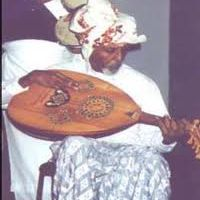
Abdullahi Qarshe, Somali musician, poet and playwright; known as the "Father of Somali music"

- Sugulle Ainanshe, 1st Sultan of the Habr Yunis

=== Politicians ===
- Ahmed Mohamed Mohamoud, former president of Somaliland from June 2010 to December 2017, fourth and longest-serving chairman of the Somali National Movement, and former chairman of the Kulmiye Party
- Muse Bihi Abdi, fifth president of Somaliland
- Abdirahman Ahmed Ali Tuur, last Somali National Movement chairman and first president of Somaliland
- Abdirahman Mohamed Abdullahi, Speaker of the House of Representatives of Somaliland and the chairman of Wadani political party
- Ahmed Yusuf Yasin, was the vice-president of Somaliland from 2002 until 2010. and the second chairman of UDUB party.
- Abdurrahman Mahmoud Aidiid, former mayor of Hargeisa, the capital of the Somaliland
- Abdikarim Ahmed Mooge, former mayor of Hargeisa
- Ali Abdi Farah, former minister of communication and culture in Djibouti
- Ali Ismail Yacqub - first minister of defence for the Somali Republic
- Abdirahim Abbey Farah, former United Nations under-secretary general
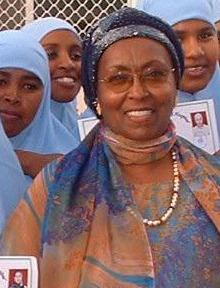
  Edna Adan Ismail, nurse midwife, activist and the first female foreign minister of Somaliland from 2003 to 2006
- Umar Arteh Ghalib, former prime minister of Somalia 1991–1993. Brought Somalia into the Arab League in 1974 during his term Foreign Minister of Somalia from 1969 to 1977. Former president of UN Security Council, teacher and poet
- Hussein Arab Isse, the Minister of Defence and the deputy prime minister of Somalia from 20 July 2011 to 4 November 2012
- Ismail Mahmud Hurre, foreign minister of the Transitional Federal Government of Somalia from mid-2006 to early 2007
- Ismail Ali Abokor, former vice-president of the Somali Democratic Republic
- Faysal Ali Warabe, chairman of the For Justice and Development party of Somaliland (UCID).
- Fowsiyo Yusuf Haji Adan, former foreign minister of Somalia and MP in Federal Parliament
- Muhammad Haji Ibrahim Egal, former prime minister of Somalia July 1960, July 1967– November 1969; former president of Somaliland from May 1993 to May 2002.
- Mohamed Abdullahi Omaar, former foreign minister of Somalia
- Mohamed Omar Arte, former deputy prime minister of Somalia.
- Abdishakur Iddin, current mayor of Berbera
- Abdirisaq Ibrahim Abdi, current mayor of Burao
- Jama Mohamed Ghalib, former Police Commissioner of the Somali Democratic Republic, Secretary of Interior, Minister of Labor and Social Affairs, Minister of Local Government and Rural Development, Minister of Transportation, and Minister of Interior.
- Osman Dubbe – Minister of Information, Culture and Tourism of Somalia
- Mohamed Ainanshe Guled, former military officer and vice president of the Somali Democratic Republic
- Muhammad Hawadle Madar, former prime minister of Somalia from 3 September 1990 to 24 January 1991
- Muhumed Hassan Jama, Governor of Awdal region
- Ismail Ali Abokor – Vice President of the Somali Democratic Republic 1971–1982
- Abdilahi Husein Iman Darawal - Somaliland politician and former SNM commander
- Abdullahi Abdi Omar "Jawaan" - Somaliland politician and introducer of the National emblem of Somaliland
- Mohamed Abdullahi Omaar, served twice as the Foreign Minister of Somalia.
- Osman Jama Ali - Prime Minister of Somalia under the Transitional National Government
- Salah Ahmed Jama - Current Deputy Prime Minister of the Federal Government of Somalia
- Hussein Mohamed Bashe - Current Minister of Agriculture of Tanzania

=== Poets ===
- Salaan Carrabey – legendary poet
- Mohamed Nur Fadal - famous poet, WWI veteran and entrepreneur
- Abdillahi Suldaan Mohammed Timacade, known as 'Timacade', a famous poet during the pre- and post-colonial periods
- Mohamed Hashi Dhamac (Gaarriye), legendary Somali poet and political activist
- Hadrawi, poet and philosopher; author of Halkaraan; also known as the "Somali Shakespeare"
- Hurre Walanwal — renowned Somali poet and songwriter
- Elmi Boodhari, legendary and beloved poet and pioneer for many Somali poetry/music genres, specifically romance and is dubbed the "King of Romance
- Hussein Hasan - legendary warrior and poet and was the grandson of the 1st Isaaq Sultan Guled Abdi
- Farah Nur, a famous warrior, poet and sultan of the Arap subclan
- Hussein Hasan - legendary warrior and poet and was the grandson of the 1st Isaaq Sultan Guled Abdi
- Kite Fiqi – legendary Habr Je'lo warrior and poet
- Aden Ahmed Dube of the Isaaq, Habr-Yonis tribe, great poems aroused envy in Raage Ugaz, and infrequently, bloody wars and irreconcilable enmity.
- Mohammed Liban from the Isaaq tribe of Habr Awal, was an eloquent and witty improviser, and even better known under the name of Mohammed Liban Giader.
- Aden Ahmed Dube "Gabay Xoog" circa 1821 –1916, poet.
- Abdiwaasa' Hasan Ali Araale Guleid, well-known poet
- Abdi Iidan Farah, 20th century Somali poet who wrote about Somali independence and camels

=== Economists ===
- Abdul Majid Hussein, Economist, former permanent representative of Ethiopia to the United Nations, 2001–2004. Leader of Ethiopian Somali Democratic League (ESDL) party in the Somali Region of Ethiopia from 1995 to 2001
- Jamal Ali Hussein, Somali politician and economists expert. He was former presidential candidate of Somaliland UCID party
- Dr. Saad Ali Shire, British-Somali politician, agronomist and economist, who is currently serving as the Minister of Finance of Somaliland. Shire formerly served as the Foreign Minister of Somaliland. He also served as the Minister of Planning and National Development of Somaliland.

=== Military leaders and personnel ===
- Mohamed Dalmar Yusuf Ali, more commonly known as "Mohamed Ali", high-ranking commander of the WSLF and SNM
- Ahmed Hurre Haariye - Commander of the Somaliland Coast Guard
- Nimcaan Yusuf Osman, current chief of staff of the Somaliland Armed Forces
- Deria Hassan, fourth Grand Sultan of Isaaq, recognised for being a wise and astute leader.
- Mohamed Kahin Ahmed, high-ranking SNM commander and current Minister of Interior of Somaliland
- Guled Haji, wise sage and commander of the Habr Yunis
- Mohamed Hasan Abdullahi, former chief of staff of the Somaliland Armed Forces
- Ibrahim Boghol, high-ranking commander of the Dervish movement
- Nuh Ismail Tani, former chief of staff of the Somaliland Armed Forces
- Mohamed Hashi Lihle - colonel of the SNA and later the commander of the military wing of the Somali National Movement
- Mohamed Bullaleh - prominent 20th-century tribal chief and commander of the Hagoogane raid that destroyed Dervish movement

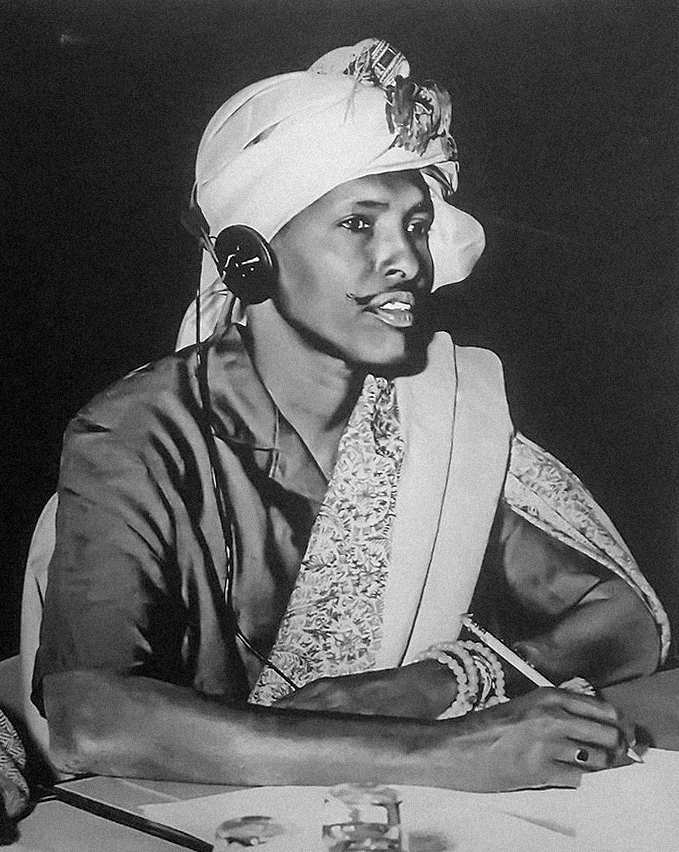
Musa Haji Ismail Galal, Somali linguist and historian who reformed the Somali Wadaad script and immensely contributed to the creation of the Somali Latin script

=== Writers and musicians ===
- Abdullahi Qarshe, Somali musician, poet and playwright; known as the "Father of Somali music"
- Ali Feiruz, popular musician in Djibouti, Somaliland and Somalia
- Mohamed Mooge Liibaan, highly renowned Somali instrumentalist and vocalist.
- Ahmed Mooge Liibaan, prominent Somali instrumentalist and vocalist
- Nadifa Mohamed – Somali novelist. Winner of the 2010 Betty Trask Prize
- Chunkz – English YouTuber, musician, host and entertainer
- Ahmed Gacayte – famous Somali singer, songwriter and composer
- Sahra Halgan, Somali singer and cultural activist
- Shamis Abokor Ismail (Guduudo Carwo), Somali singer

=== Scholars ===
- Musa Haji Ismail Galal, a Somali writer, scholar, linguist, historian and polymath
- Abdillahi Diiriye Guled - Literary scholar and discoverer of the Somali prosodic system
- Jama Musse Jama, prominent Somali ethnomathematician and author
- Hussein Mohammed Adam (Tanzania) - foremost Somali intellectual and scholar who founded the Somali Studies International Association (SSIA)

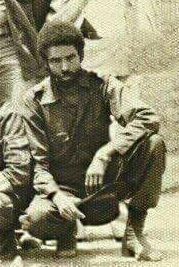
Mohamed Farah Dalmar Yusuf "Mohamed Ali", Somali military commander and revolutionary known for his leadership within Western Somali Liberation Front, Afraad and later the Somali National Movement

=== Religious leaders and scholars ===
- Sheikh Bashir, Somali religious leader who waged the 1945 Sheikh Bashir Rebellion
- Sheikh Ali Warsame – prominent Somali Islamic cleric and preacher, founder of AIAI (1939–2022)
- Sheikh Mustafe Haji Ismail, Somali-Norwegian Muslim cleric, scholar, and Islamic philosopher
- Sheikh Madar – head of Qadiriyya tariqa and influential figure in the early growth and expansion of Hargeisa
- Abdallah Shihiri, senior advisor to the Mullah of the Dervish movement
- Deria Arale, senior advisor to the Mullah of the Dervish movement
- Haji Sudi, one of the founders of the Somali Dervish movement
- Sheikh Mohamed Sheikh Omar Dirir - prominent religious scholar and businessman
- Sultan Nur Ahmed Aman, Sultan of the Habr Yunis and one of the founders of the Somali Dervish movement
- Ridwan Hirsi Mohamed – Former deputy prime minister of Somalia and former minister of religious affairs of Somalia
- Yasin Handule Wais religious scholar and founder of Somaliland's first Islamic party in the mid-20th century

=== Entrepreneurs ===
- Abdirashid Duale, Somali entrepreneur and the CEO of Dahabshiil
- Abdi Awad Ali (Indhadeero) – renowned Somali entrepreneur and founder and former CEO of Indhadeero Group of Companies
- Amina Moghe Hersi (b. 1963), Award-winning Somali entrepreneur who has launched several multimillion-dollar projects in Kampala, Uganda
- Ismail Ahmed, owner and CEO of WorldRemit which is one of the fastest growing money transfer company in the world and he's considered 7th most influential man in Britain.
- Mahmood Hussein Mattan, Somali former merchant seaman who was wrongfully convicted of the murder of Lily Volpert on 6 March 1952
- Ibrahim Dheere, considered to be the first Somali billionaire and richest Somali person in the world with an estimated net worth of 1.8 billion US Dollars.
- Mohammed Abdillahi Kahin 'Ogsadey', Somali business tycoon based in Ethiopia, where he established MAO Harar Horse, the first African corporation to export coffee and amassed a net worth of approximately $3 Billion Ethiopian Birr.

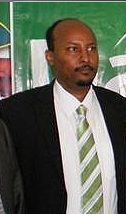
Abdirashid Duale, Somali entrepreneur and the CEO of Dahabshiil, an international funds transfer company

=== Activists ===
- Edna Adan Ismail, first female Foreign Minister of Somaliland, has been called "The Muslim Mother Teresa" for her charity work and activism for women and girls
- Michael Mariano – legendary Somali politician, lawyer and key figure in independence struggle and Somali Youth League
- Farah Omar – anti-colonial ideologue and founder of the first Somali Association
- Hassan Isse Jama, one of the founding fathers of the SNM in London, former deputy chairman of SNM, first vice president of Somaliland.
- Hassan Adan Wadadid- One of the original founders of the Somali National Movement and served as the movement's first vice-chairman.
- Hanan Ibrahim, gender activist and first Somali British to be awarded Member of British Empire (MBE) for community work in UK
- Nimco Ali, British social activist
- Magid Magid – Somali-British activist and politician who served as the Lord Mayor of Sheffield from May 2018 to May 2019

=== Athletes ===
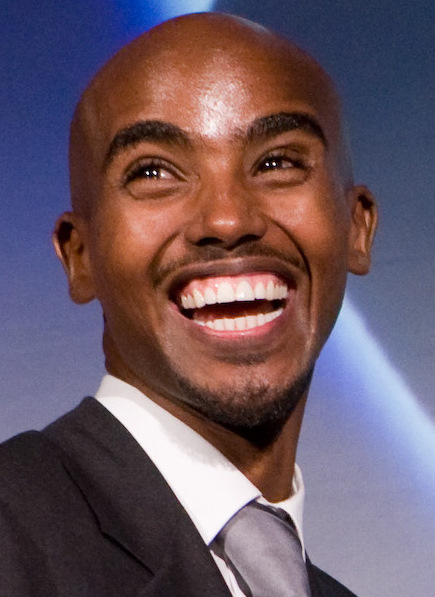
Mo Farah, British long-distance runner and the most successful British track athlete in modern Olympic Games history

- Mo Farah, British 4 time Olympic gold medalist and the most decorated athlete in British athletics history.
- Jama Mohamed Aden — Somali former middle-distance runner and coach
- Mohammed Ahmed, Somali-Canadian long-distance runner and Olympian
- Mohammed Ahamed, Norwegian-Somalian association footballer currently playing in the Tippeligaen for Tromsø IL. He plays as a Center Forward
- Ahmed Said Ahmed, an international footballer who plays for VJS as a defender.
- Bashir Abdi, Somali-Belgian athlete
- Sheikh Hamse - notorious Somali football player

=== Journalists ===
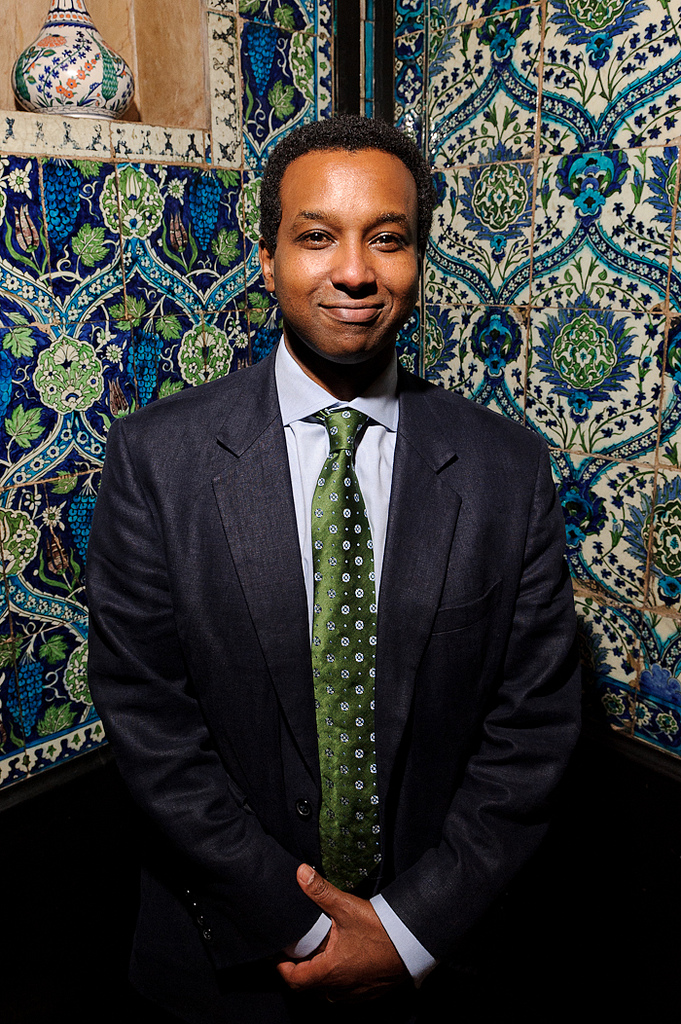
Rageh Omaar, British-Somali journalist and writer

- Ahmed Hassan Awke, Somali journalist and broadcaster, veteran of the BBC World Service, the Voice of America, Somaliland National TV, Horn Cable Television, Radio Mogadishu and Universal TV, former presidential spokesman of Siad Barre during his military junta.
- Rageh Omaar, Somali-British journalist and writer. He used to be a BBC world affairs correspondent, In September 2006, he moved to a new post at Al Jazeera English, and as of 2017 is currently with ITV News
- Mona Kosar Abdi – news anchor for ABC's Good Morning America

=== Other ===
- Hussain Bisad, is one of the tallest men in the world, at 2.32 m (7 ft 7 1/2 in). He has the largest hand span of anyone alive
- Sada Mire, Swedish-Somali archaeologist, art historian and presenter
- Abdi Haybe Lambad, famous Somali stand-up comedian
- Buurmadow – well known clan elder
- Hussein Mohammed Adam "Tanzania", Somali professor, journalist and documentary maker
- Sooraan, famous actor and comedian
