= Isaaq Sultanate =

1750–1884 northern Somali kingdom

Isaaq Sultanate سَلْدَنَدْدَ إساقْ (Somali) السلطنة الإسحاقية (Arabic)
- 1749–1884
- A banner used by the Adal Sultanate and later the Isaaq on key religious shrines

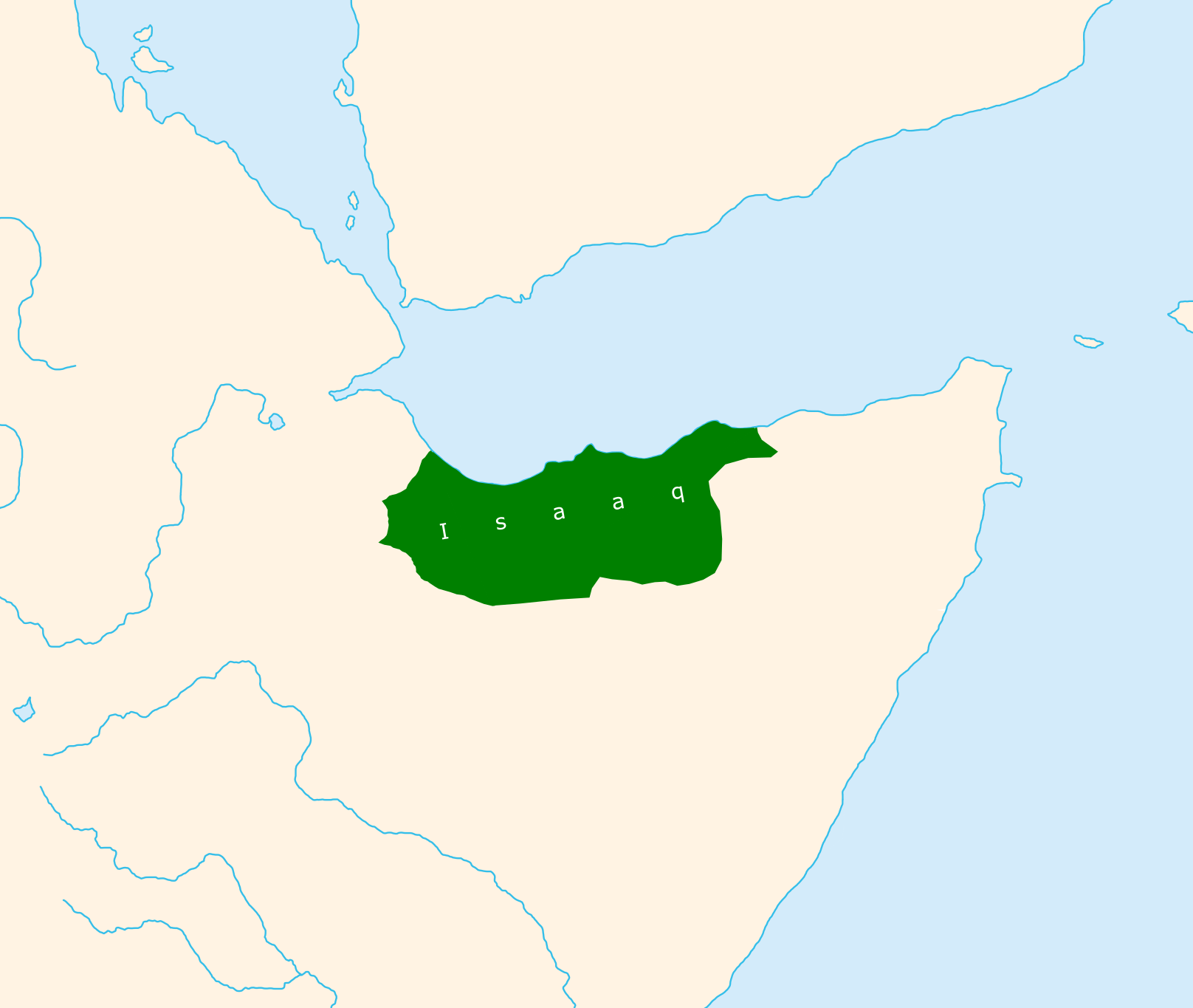
- Extent of the Isaaq clan-family at the end of the 19th century
- Capital: Toon (first); Hargeisa (last)
- Common languages: Arabic
- Religion: Sunni Islam
- Government: Monarchy
- Sultan
  - ~1700s: Abdi Isse (Traditional Chief)
  - 1750–1808 (first Sultan): Guled Abdi
  - 1870–1884 (last): Deria Hassan
- History
  - Established: 1749
  - Disestablished: 1884
Preceded by	Succeeded by
Adal Sultanate; Ottoman Zeila	British Somaliland
- Today part of: Somaliland

The Isaaq Sultanate (Somali: Saldanadda Isaaq, Wadaad: سَلْدَنَدْدَ إساقْ, Arabic: السلطنة الإسحاقية) was a Muslim sultanate that ruled parts of the Horn of Africa in the 18th and 19th centuries. The kingdom spanned the territories of the Isaaq clan in modern-day Somaliland and Ethiopia. It was governed by the Rer Guled Eidagale branch of the Garhajis clan and is the pre-colonial predecessor to the Republic of Somaliland.

== History ==
=== Origins ===
Somali genealogical tradition places the origin of the Isaaq tribe in the 12th or 13th century with the arrival of Sheikh Ishaaq Bin Ahmed (Sheikh Ishaaq), who was one of the scholars who crossed the sea from Arabia to the Horn of Africa. Sheikh Ishaaq settled in the coastal town of Maydh in modern-day northeastern Somaliland. Hence, Sheikh Ishaaq married two local women in Somaliland that left him eight sons.

By the 1300s the Isaaq clans united to defend their inhabited territories and resources during clan conflicts against migrating clans, and by the 1600s, after the fall of the Adal Sultanate, the Somali lands split into numerous clan states, among them the Isaaq.

The earliest documented traditional leader of the Isaaq clan mentioned in Somali historical literature appears in Futuh al-Habasha (The Conquest of Abyssinia) by the historian Shihab al-Din Ahmad al-Jizani. The book records two Garaads from the Habar Magaadle sub-clan who played significant roles during the wars of Imam Ahmad ibn Ibrahim al-Ghazi (Ahmed Gurey), Ahmad Gerri Xuseen and Garaad Daawad (or Dawit). The first Garaad participated in the early stages of the jihad, while the second Garaad was involved in the later battles.

I. M. Lewis states:

The Marrehan and the Habr Magadle [Magādi] also play a very prominent role (...) The text refers to two Ahmads's with the nickname 'Left-handed'. One is regularly presented as 'Ahmad Guray, the Somali' (...) identified as Ahmad Guray Xuseyn, chief of the Habr Magadle.

According to oral tradition, prior to the Guled Dynasty the Isaaq clan-family were ruled by a dynasty of the Tolje'lo branch starting from, descendants of Ahmed nicknamed Tol Je'lo, the eldest son of Sheikh Ishaaq. There were eight Tolje'lo rulers in total who ruled for centuries starting from the 13th century. The last Tolje'lo ruler Boqor Harun (Somali: Boqor Haaruun), nicknamed Dhuh Barar (Somali: Dhuux Baraar) was overthrown by a coalition of Isaaq clans. The once strong Tolje'lo clan were scattered and took refuge amongst the Habr Awal with whom they still mostly live. However, the names and lineages of the rulers before Dhuh remain uncertain, and it is unknown whether they all belonged to the same Tol Je'lo lineage.

It is likely that the Isaaq leadership structure evolved over time, shifting from the title of Garaad to Boqor (King) before eventually adopting the title of Sultan, particularly among the Tol Je'lo lineage, reflecting broader changes in Somali governance, influenced by historical, political, and external factors.

=== Establishment ===
The modern Guled Dynasty of the Isaaq Sultanate was established in the middle of the 18th century by Sultan Guled of the Eidagale clan of Isaaq clan family. His coronation took place after the victorious battle of Lafaruug, in which Guled’s father, Abdi Eissa (Leader) successfully led the Isaaq, After witnessing his leadership and courage, the Isaaq chiefs recognized his father Abdi who refused the position instead relegating the title to his underage son Guled while the father acted as the regent until the son came of age. Guled was crowned as the first Sultan of the Isaaq clan in July 1750. Sultan Guled thus ruled the Isaaq up until his death in 1808.

==== Succession dispute ====
Sultan Guled ruled over the Isaaq for over 50 years. When he ascended to the throne, he was still a young man. As he grew old and fell ill, a struggle for succession emerged among his 12 sons, who belonged to eight different uterine lineages. The term "Ba" encompasses all the sons born by one specific wife, and precedes the name of the mother’s tribe or subtribe. The eldest was Roble, while the youngest was Deria. The breakdown of Guled’s sons and their respective factions was as follows:

1. Roble – The eldest (Ba-Cawrala)
2. Duale "Aftaag", Farah, Ali, and Abdi (Ba-Canbaro)
3. Jama, Yusuf, and Egal (Ba-Saleebaan)
4. Warfa (Ba-Bartire)
5. Magan "Gaabo" (Separate uterine lineage)
6. Gatah (Separate uterine lineage)
7. Deria (Ba-Musa 'Arre)

As soon as Sultan Guled's health declined, disputes arose over who would inherit the throne. Duale "Aftaag" (circa 1788–1877), a senior member of the Ba-Canbaro, quickly pushed for his faction’s control over the sultanate. Duale, a well-known elder, was the father of notable figures such as Qawdhan Duale (1858–1941), Nur Duale “Dhagacun” (1841–1890), and Mohamud Duale “Candho-eeg” (1839–1907).

Since Roble Guled from the Ba-Cawrala was the eldest son, he was the rightful heir. Duale from the Ba-Canbaro approached Rooble and advised his half-brother to raid and capture livestock belonging to the Ogaden so as to serve the Isaaq sultans and dignitaries who would attend his upcoming coronation, as part of a plot to discredit the would-be sultan and usurp the throne. Roble, unaware of the plot and without objection, agreed to the raid and carried it out. After the dignitaries were made aware of this fact by Duale they removed Roble from the line of succession and offered to crown Jama from the Ba-Saleban, his half brother. Magan, who was close in age to Jama, strongly pushed Jama to take the throne and prevent the powerful Ba-Canbaro from gaining too much power, however Jama promptly declined the offer and suggested that Farah from the Ba-Canbaro, Duale's full brother and son of Guled's fourth wife Ambaro Me'ad Gadid be crowned. The Isaaq subsequently crowned Farah. Feeling betrayed, Magan left in anger.

==== Sultan Farah's death ====
After Farah’s coronation, Magan attacked Duale from the Ba-Canbaro (Farah's full brother), stabbing him with a spear and leaving him wounded. Angered by the betrayal, Magan left his clan and sought refuge among the Ishaq 'Arre, a subclan of the Habr Yunis. He and his followers settled near the Hamas (Xamaas) well, along with four descendants of the Ishaq 'Arre.

Years later, Sultan Farah remained on the throne. During this time, he married an Ogaden woman, who later gave birth to Hure Suldan and Warfaa Suldaan—future leaders of the Ba-Ogaadeen subclan. While traveling with an Ogaden caravan near Berbera, Sultan Farah was spotted by Magan, who still held a grudge. Magan alerted the Ishaq 'Arre warriors and urged them to attack the caravan. During the raid, the Ishaq 'Arre fighters discovered that Sultan Fatah was among the travelers. Initially, they hesitated, but Magan taunted their leader Dul-Guduud, accusing him of cowardice. Enraged, Dul-Guduud threw a spear that fatally struck Sultan Farah, killing him on the spot, with his grave remaining in Hamas to this day.

=== Early European Conflict ===
With the new European incursion into the Gulf of Aden and Horn of Africa contact between Somalis and Europeans on African soil would happen again for the first time since the Ethiopian–Adal war. When a British vessel named the Mary Anne attempted to dock in Berbera's port in 1825 it was attacked and multiple members of the crew were massacred by the Garhajis. In response the Royal Navy enforced a blockade and some accounts narrate a bombardment of the city. In 1827 two years later the British arrived and extended an offer to relieve the blockade which had halted Berbera's lucrative trade in exchange for indemnity. Following this initial suggestion the Battle of Berbera 1827 would break out. After the Isaaq defeat, 15,000 Spanish dollars was to be paid by the Isaaq Sultanate leaders for the destruction of the ship and loss of life. In the 1820s Sultan Farah Sultan Guled of the Isaaq Sultanate penned a letter to Sultan bin Saqr Al Qasimi of Ras Al Khaimah requesting military assistance and joint religious war against the British. This would not materialize as Sultan Saqr was incapacitated by prior Persian Gulf campaign of 1819 and was unable to send aid to Berbera. Alongside their stronghold in the Persian Gulf & Gulf of Oman the Qasimi were very active both militarily and economically in the Gulf of Aden and were given to plunder and attack ships as far west as the Mocha on the Red Sea. They had numerous commercial ties with the Somalis, leading vessels from Ras Al Khaimah and the Persian Gulf to regularly attend trade fairs in the large ports of Berbera and Zeila and were very familiar with the Isaaq Sultanate respectively.

Atack on Lieutenant Richard Burton and The Blockade of Berbera

In April 1855, explorer Lieutenant Richard Burton had set out on his search for the source of the Nile and was encamped near Berbera. On 19 April, his camp was attacked and plundered. In response, British forces blockaded the port city of Berbera in the Isaaq Sultanate from 1855 to 1856. It was the second British military action against the city after the 1827 attack on Berbera.

The blockade ceased on 9 November 1856 following a treaty that was signed between the British East India Company and the Sheikhs of the Habr Awal, Ishaaq. This was signed in the presence of Captain H. L. Playfair, the assistant political resident in Aden. This treaty's six articles secured the economic and commercial interests of both parties. However, it debarred the 'Isa Musa clan family and their goods from Aden due to their refusal to hand over the main assailant of the attack, Ou Ali. The 'Isa Musa did not engage in the treaty themselves.

=== Berbera Civil War ===
One of the most important settlements of the Sultanate was the city of Berbera which was one of the key ports of the Gulf of Aden. Caravans would pass through Hargeisa and the Sultan would collect tribute and taxes from traders before they would be allowed to continue onwards to the coast. Following a massive conflict between the Ayal Ahmed and Ayal Yunis branches of the Habr Awal over who would control Berbera in the mid-1840s, Sultan Hassan brought both subclans before a holy relic from the tomb of Aw Barkhadle. An item that is said to have belonged to Bilal Ibn Rabah.

When any grave question arises affecting the interests of the Isaakh tribe in general. On a paper yet carefully preserved in the tomb, and bearing the sign-manual of Belat [Bilal], the slave of one [of] the early khaleefehs, fresh oaths of lasting friendship and lasting alliances are made...In the season of 1846 this relic was brought to Berbera in charge of the Haber Gerhajis, and on it the rival tribes of Aial Ahmed and Aial Yunus swore to bury all animosity and live as brethren.

Despite this resolution, control of Berbera later passed to the ambitious Isaaq merchant and politician Sharmarke Ali Saleh, who would eventually become governor and emir of Zeila and berbera on behalf of Sultan Hassan Sultan Farah.

=== Sharmarke Ali Saleh’s rule of the Northern Somali Coast ===
Sharmarke Ali Saleh controlled Berbera for several years from 1845–1852.

In 1841 Sharmarke took control of Ottoman Zeila with fifty Matchlock men, two cannons and an army of mounted spearmen managed to invade Zeila and depose its Arab Governor, Mohammed Al Barr. Sharmarke used the canons to fire at the city walls which frightened Al Barr's followers and caused them to flee. Sharmarke succeeded Al Barr as the ruler of Zeila and its dependencies.

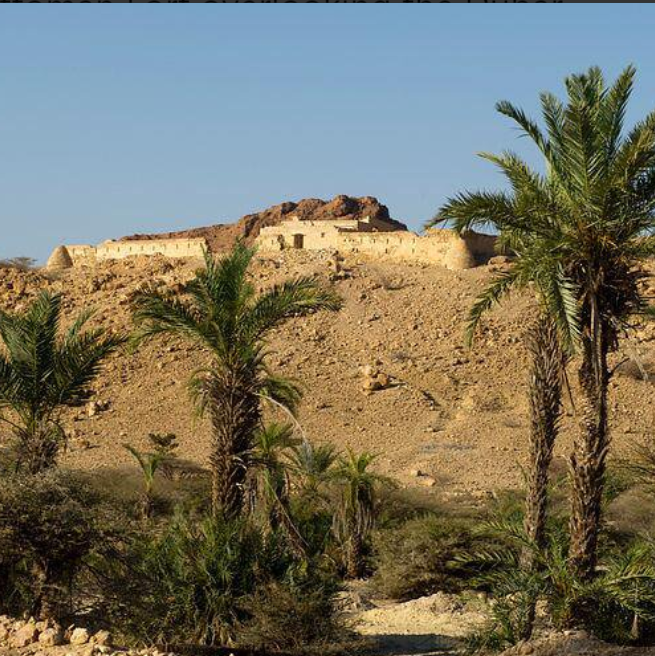
19th century fort in Berbera constructed by Haji Sharmarke Ali Saleh

Sharmarke's influence was not limited to the coast as he had many allies in the interior of the Somali country and even further in Abyssinia. Among his allies were the Kings of Shewa. When there was tension between the Amir of Harar Abu Bakr II ibn `Abd al-Munan and Sharmarke, as a result of the Amir arresting one of his agents in Harar, Sharmarke persuaded the son of Sahle Selassie, the King of Shewa, to imprison on his behalf about 300 citizens of Harar then resident in Shewa, for a length of two years. In 1855, in an act seen as defiant of foreign powers, Sharmarke refused to sell to M. Richet, the French agent at Jeddah, a house in Zeila, citing "how easily an Agency becomes a fort", and preferring "a considerable loss to the presence of dangerous friends".

=== Fracture and Decline ===
==== Habr Yunis Sultanate ====
During the reign of Sultan Farah Guled the Habr Yunis would break from his rule and form the Habr Yunis Sultanate. Sultan Deria Sugulle would have established his own capital at Wadhan and his own taxes. The Habr Yunis Sultanate inherited the profitable trade routes leading into the Sheikh mountains and Burao from the Isaaq Sultanate and reached a pinnacle under Sultan Hersi Aman before being engulfed in civil wars after his considerable power caused a rebellion to break out in the late 1870s.

The split was noticeable and Lieutenant C.P Rigby in the year 1848 writes about the two Sultans and the capital of the Isaaq at Toon.

The Hubr Gajis tribe and its different branches are governed by two Sultans, named Sultan Deriah [Habr Yunis Sultan] and Sultan Farah: the residence of the latter is at Toro.

==== Internal Eidagale Conflicts ====
During the reign of the last ruler of the Isaaq Sultanate Deria Hassan tensions were high between his Rer Guled and another subclan of Eidagale. The legendary Eidagale warrior and poet Hussein Hasan (Somali: Xuseen Xassan) who hailed from the Rer Guled was prideful and urged them to continue the conflict. Standing against him was a similarly skilled poet and warrior Hersi Absiyeh (Somali: Xirsi Cabsiye), a prominent member of the closely related Rer Abdi Bari who were warring with the Rer Guled. He called for the regular shir or meeting of subclans where he would take council and advise on what decisions to make next. Sultan Deria ruled that blood payment or mag was sufficient for both parties to exchange at the shir with the Rer Guled losing six and the Abdi Bari six as well. Hussein Hasan was boastful and urged for continued conflict with a rousing gabay rejecting the decision.

Lix nin oo mankiyo shaalka iyo midhaha Guuleed ah
Oo wada ma dhaafta ah raggii ugu maloongeeyey
Inaan waliba maal ugu daraa waa masalo dhaafe
Waligeed markaha looma culin magannu soocnaaye
Waa waxaanay dhagahaygu maqal maanta ka horoowe
Inaanaan cayuun soo madhayn mudhayo dhaadheer leh
Haddaynu Reer Mataan nahay sidaa waydun maan garane

— Xuseen Xasan
Translation:

Six men who are the buds, the shawl and the fruit (youth) of Guuleed
Who together were the best, most excellent of men
That I add wealth to that is beyond the pale
We'll never purify the vessel with blood compensation which we have separated off
This is something my ears have never heard before today
That we empty [our hands] of very tall camels
If we are Reer Mataan you will follow my thinking

Sultan Deria responded by sending Hussein away to Berbera and then resuming the shir. Absiyeh was made to swear a solemn oath not to recite a gabay following the Sultan's decision but he could not resist, especially since Hussein was away. Hussein returned and lamented that he missed the occasion and the two other men (Deria and Absiyeh) prevailed that day.

=== Egyptian occupation ===
In 1870 The Egyptians occupied Hargeisa after failing to take over Aussa. They continued on to invade Berbera, Zeila, Sagallo, and Bulhar. They helped rebuild a dying Berbera economy, and established Berbera as the capital of the Khedive in east Africa. Although they did not control northern Somaliland for long they did build lighthouses, piers, improved coastal ports, and promoted Islam. In 1883 the Egyptians who were being pressured by the British decided to evacuate the Somali, and Oromo cities. During the Egyptian rule the Somalis controlled the Zeila-Harar trade route, and the Oromos shared the Berbera-Harar trade route. British officer Hunters carried a number of surveys in the Somali coast. He described the Habr Awal Isaaqs as a friendly people who lived between Harar, and Berbera, and that they supported the Egyptian capture of many towns. In 1884 the Egyptians, and Habr Awal burnt down a number of Bursuuk villages, in retaliation the Bursuuk attacked Habr Awal caravans on their way to Berbera. During the withdrawal period officer Hunters was more concerned on Berbera as rumour spread about the Mahdiyya of Sudan. He worried about Berbera more than Harar, because the Habr Awal Somalis had murdered the Governor of Berbera Abd- Al Rahman Bey. They did this because Abd Al Rahman had murdered a Somali in an attempt to rob a caravan. He also feared the Issa Somali would invade Berbera so he ordered a British warship be anchored at Berbera so the British could detect any Somali movement in the area. Hunter also writes that the Emir of Zeila, Abu Bakr was possibly planning an invasion of Berbera. Hinter describes Abu Bakr as a Afar businessmen, and Emir who held great influence over the Afar, and Somalis. He also describes him as a slave master, and that he controlled slave trade in the read sea. Hunters describes the Governor of Berbera as a man who was ready to take any command, but like all his friends was thuggish, and rude. In 1884 the British signed a deal with the Habr Awal which allowed British presence in Berbera for a while. in October 1884 the Egyptians left Berbera.

=== Incorporation into British Somaliland ===
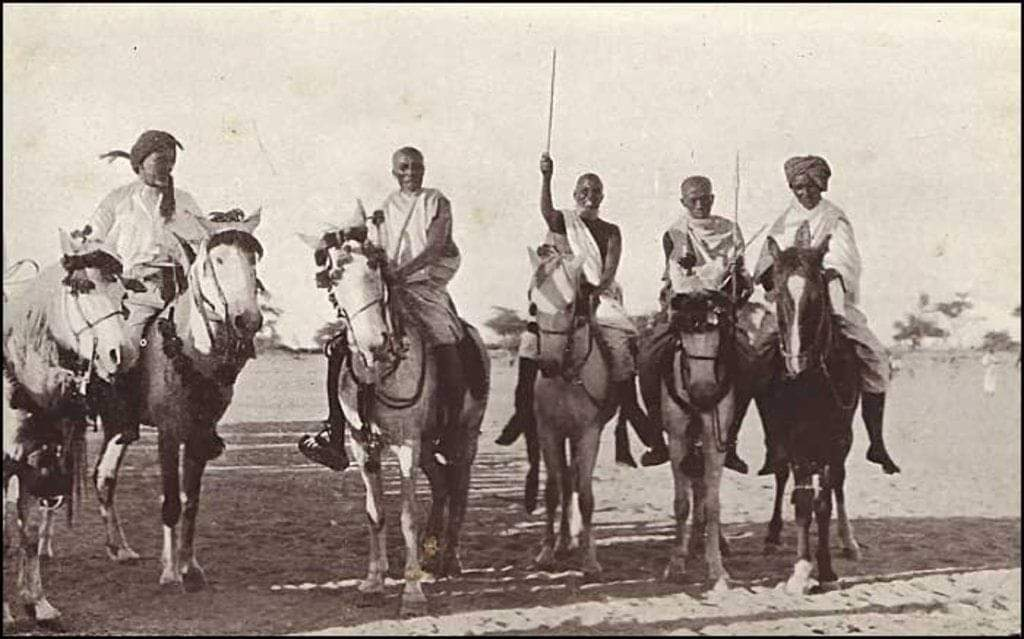
Eidagale warriors on horseback

By the early 1880s the Isaaq Sultanate had been reduced to the Ciidangale confederation with the Eidagale, and Ishaaq Arreh subclan of the Habr Yunis remaining, although the sultan still enjoyed widespread prestige among the Isaaq. In 1884–1886 the British signed treaties with the coastal subclans and had not yet penetrated the interior in any significant way. Sultan Deria Hassan remained de facto master of Hargeisa and its environs. Working in conjunction with Mohammed Abdullah Hassan and the Dervish Movement he would exchange letters with Hassan in the first year of the movement's foundation and incited an insurrection in Hargeisa in 1900.

They were unable to break from Eidagale tutelage and decided to stand and change this situation. Led by their famed warrior and poet the crowned him as Sultan and raised arms against the Eidagale and Sultan Deria Hassan.

Composing this poem entitled The Limits of Submission Farah speaks of the conflict and intolerance to the subordinate status to the Sultan.

Rag Sabaan ka Sabaan baan

Salaantow badiyaa

Hadduu saakimi waayona

Sariir baan u goglaayoon

Iska seexo idhaa

Hadduu saakimi waayona

Caanahii hasha Suubbaan

Saddex jeer u lisaayoo

Ku sarriigo idhaa

Hadduu saakimi waayona

Summalkii rugta joogiyo

Sogobkaan u qalaa

Hadduu saakimi waayona

Sarreenkii Cadameed baan

Sixinkowgu badshaa

Hadduu saakimi waayona

Gabadh suurad wanaagsan baan

Surrad'owga dhisaa

Hadduu saakimi waayona

Xoolo gooni u soofiyo

Sadadaan ku ladhaa

Hadduu saakimi waayona

Seeddoow Mood iyo Mood iyo

Salaantaan badiyaa

Hadduu saakimi waayona

Salaaddaan lallabaayoo

Maydal seedo madow iyo

Safkii aan ka dhashiyo

Salligaan cuskadaayoo

Sulub eebo ku joogtaan

Sarartaa ku dhuftaayoo

Sanbabkaan ka baxshaayoo

Markaasuu sallimaa

— Faarax Nuur Hadduu Saakimi Waayona
Translation:

Time and again to men

I give many greetings

If he fails to calm down

I set out a sleeping mat for him

And say 'Just sleep'

And if he fails to calm down

I milk Suubbaan, the camel

For him three times

And say 'Drink from it'

And if he fails to calm down

The ram that is at the settlement

And the castrated billy goat I slaughter for him

And if he fails to calm down

The wheat from Aden

I will mix with ghee for him

And if he fails to calm down

A girl of fine appearance

And mats for the bridal hut I give to him

And if he fails to calm down

I drive livestock to graze just for him

And add them to the share

And if he fails to calm down

Oh brother-in-law 'Pass peacefully' and 'Welcome'

I pile these greetings on him

And if he fails to calm down

At the time of the prayers I announce the reer is leaving

The grey horse with black tendons

And the line I am born of

And supporting myself on the salli

With a spearhead of iron

I strike his sides

And make his lungs come out

And then he settles the account

Although the odds were not in their favor, they were victorious in their campaign for independence.

== Economy ==
The Sultanate had a robust economy and trade was significant at the main port of Berbera but also eastwards along the coast. The Berbera trade fair was the major commercial event of the year with tens of thousands descending on the town.

Berbera held an annual fair during the cool rain-free months between October and April. This long drawn out market handled immense quantities of coffee, gum Arabic, myrrh and other commodities. These goods in the early nineteenth century were almost exclusively handled by Somalis who, Salt says, had "a kind of navigation act by which they exclude the Arab vessels from their ports and bring the produce of their country either to Aden or Mocha in their own dows."

Eidagale and Habr Yunis traders held the southerly trade routes into the Haud region and the Habr Awal the westerly ones, with the Habr Je'lo maintaining the easterly routes towards Berbera and their substantial frankincense trade exporting from Heis, Karin, and Ceel Daraad. The western and southern routes would merge at Hargeisa. The Isaaq were also the predominant Somali traders in the Yemeni ports of Mukalla, Mocha and Aden. In addition the sultanate produced ghee, myrrh, ivory and gum arabic, which would then be exported to Yemen.

== Administration ==
An Isaaq banner used on key religious sites derived from an Adal Sultanate flag

The Sultan of the Isaaq often called for shirs or regular meetings where he would be informed and advised by leading elders or religious figures on what decisions to make. In the case of the Dervish movement Sultan Deria Hassan had chosen not to join after receiving counsel from Sheikh Madar. He addressed early tensions between the Saad Musa and Eidagale upon the former's settlement into the growing town of Hargeisa in the late 19th century.

The Sultan would also be responsible for organizing grazing rights and in the late 19th century new agricultural spaces. The allocation of resources and sustainable use of them was also a matter that Sultans concerned themselves with and was crucial in an arid region. In the 1870s there was a famous meeting between Sheikh Madar and Sultan Deria proclaimed that hunting and tree cutting in the vicinity of Hargeisa would be banned

The holy relics from Aw Barkhadle would be brought and the Isaaqs would swear oaths upon it in presence of the Sultan whenever fierce internal combat broke out. Aside from the leading Sultan of Isaaq there were numerous Akils, Garaads and subordinate Sultans alongside religious authorities that constituted the Sultanate before some would declare their own independence or simply break from his authority.

== Legacy ==
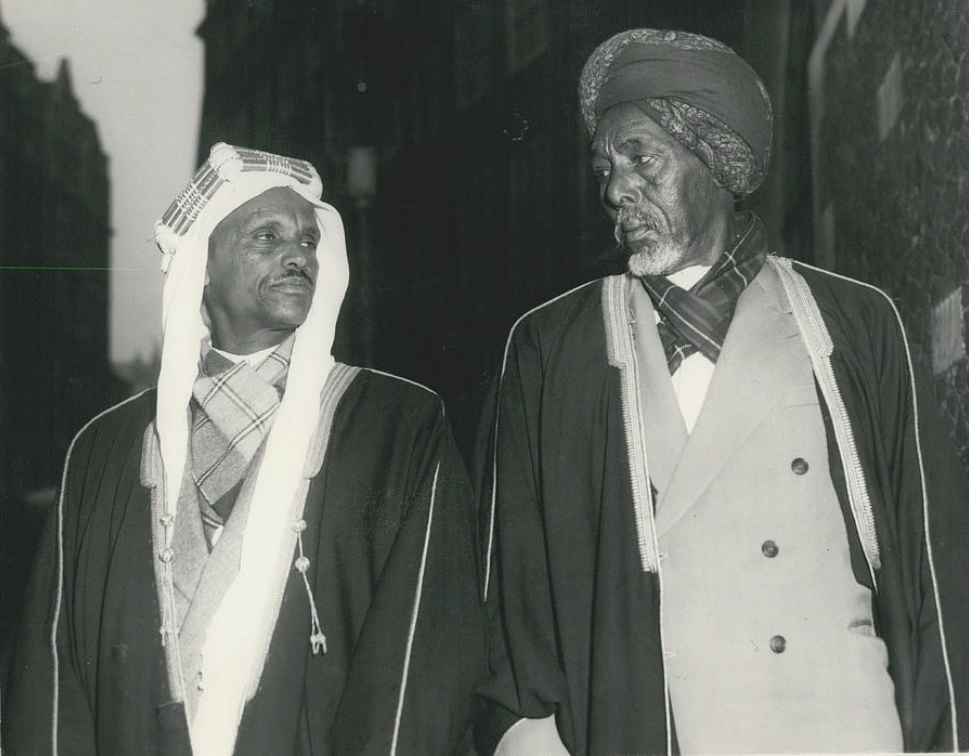
Sultan Abdillahi Deria (right) with Habr Awal Sultan Abdulrahman Deria (left) in London 1955 to petition for the Haud Reserved Area.

Amongst the Isaaq the traditional institution and leadership of the clan survived the British Somaliland period into present times. The Rer Guled Sultans, although no longer ruling vast territory, and with separate Isaaq subclans having their own Sultans, still enjoy primus inter pares status and retain the title of Suldaanka Guud ee Isaaq (Grand Sultan of the Isaaq). Sultan Deria Hassan continued in his role until his death in 1939, with his son and successor Sultan Abdillahi Deria strongly involved in the independence movement of British Somaliland, having led a delegation of politicians and Sultans to the United Kingdom in order to petition and pressure the government to return the Haud Reserved Area that had been ceded to Ethiopia by the British. Sultan Rashid Abdillahi likewise was also active in independence and post-independence politics, being elected as the Vice President of the National Assembly of Somalia in 1966, and representing Somalia at the world parliamentary conference in 1967.

With the collapse of the Somali Republic, and the subsequent Somaliland war of independence in the 80s and 90s, Sultan Mahamed Abdiqadir would be heavily involved in the peace process and reconciliation of the rebirthed Somaliland. With Somaliland's independence in 1991 the Isaaq sultans assumed the title of Grand Sultan of Somaliland (Suldaanka Guud ee Soomaaliland).

== See also ==
- Somalia–Somaliland border
- Ethiopia–Somaliland border
