= List of districts in the Somali Region =

This is a list of the cities and woredas (districts), in the Somali Region of Ethiopia, compiled from material on the Central Statistical Agency (CSA) website.

It is unclear how many woredas actually exist in the Somali Region, since the names and number of woredas given in the CSA's documents differ between 2005 and 2007, and different maps show a variety of names and boundaries.

The subdivisions of Somali have been changed several times, often due to local clan groups claiming their own woreda, and the boundary between the Somali and Oromia Regions is disputed, leading to ambiguity over the status of border areas.

In February 2016, the DDSI parliament added two new zones (for a total of 11), new districts to each of the 9 previous zones, and several city administrations (additions marked below with ‡).

== List of districts by zone ==
=== Afder Zone ===
- Bare ‡
- Elekere
- GodGod ‡
- Hargelle
- Mirab Imi
- Ilig Dheere
- Raaso ‡
- Qooxle ‡
- Doollo bay
- Baarey
- washaaqo
- ciid laami
- xagar moqor

=== Dhawa Zone ===
Dhawa Zone is new in 2016; created from Liben Zone.

- Hudet ‡
- Lahey(zone administration)
- Mubaarak ‡
- Qadhaadhumo ‡
- malka mari
- Ceel Goof
- Ceel orba
- Dheer dheertu
- Ceel dheer

=== Dollo Zone ===
- Boh
- Danot
- Daratole
- Geladin <!see also Geladi (woreda). Duplicate?-->
- Gal-Hamur ‡
- Lehel-Yucub ‡
- Warder
- Yamarugley
- Urmadag

=== Erer Zone ===
Erer Zone is new in 2016; created from Nogab Zone.

- Fiq ‡
- Lagahida ‡
- Mayaa-muluqo ‡
- Qubi ‡
- Salahad ‡
- Waangaay ‡
- Xamaro ‡
- Yaxoob ‡

=== Fafan Zone ===
- Awbare
- Babille
- Goljano
- Gursum
- Harawo ‡
- Haroorays
- Harshin
- Jijiga (headquarters in Haroorayso) ‡
- Kebri Beyah special woreda ‡
- Qooraan (headquarters in Mulla) ‡
- Shabeeley
- Wajale special woreda ‡
- Tuli Guled

=== Jarar Zone ===
- Araarso
- Awaare
- Bilcil buur ‡
- Birqod
- Daroor
- Degehabur Special Zone
- Dhagaxmadow
- Dig ‡
- Gunagado
- Misraq Gashamo
- Yoocaale

=== Korahe Zone ===
- Boodaley ‡
- Ceel-Ogadeen ‡
- Dobawein
- Higloley ‡
- Kebri Dahar special woreda
- Kudunbuur ‡
- Laas-dhankayre ‡
- Marsin
- Shekosh
- Shilavo

=== Liben Zone ===
- Bokolmayo
- Deka Softi
- Dollo Ado
- Filtu
- Kersa Dula
- Gooro bakaksa
- Gurra damole

=== Nogob Zone ===
- Ayun ‡
- Duhun
- Elweyne, Ceelwayne:
- Gerbo administrative town of Nogob zone.
- Hararey/Xaraarey ‡
- Hora-shagax ‡
- Segeg

=== Shabelle Zone ===
- Abaaqoorow ‡
- Adadle
- Beercaano
- Danan
- Elele ‡
- Ferfer
- Gode Special Zone
- Imiberi
- Kelafo
- Mustahil

=== Sitti Zone ===
- Adigala
- Afdem
- Ayesha
- Bike ‡
- Dambal
- Erer
- Gablalu ‡
- Mieso
- Shinile
- Dhunyar
- Daymeed

== See also ==
- Districts of Ethiopia
