= Aware (town) =

City in Somali Region, Ethiopia

Aware Awaare
- Capital city and town
- Location within Ethiopia
- Coordinates: 8°16′0″N 44°9′0″E
- Country: Ethiopia
- Region: Somali
- Zone: Jarar
- Districts: Aware (woreda)
- Elevation: 807 m (2,648 ft)

Population (2005)
  - Total: 132,149
- Time zone: UTC+3 (EAT)

Aware (Somali: Awaare) is a town and the capital city of the Aware woreda, in the Somali Region of Ethiopia. It is frequently considered part of the Haud.

== Overview ==
Aware is situated near the border with Somaliland and is one of the oldest cities in the Hawd, with a history spanning over centuries. Prior to the 1977 Ogaden War , the city served as the principal seat of the Jarar Zone. At the onset of the '77 war, the provincial capital of the zone was moved more inland to Degehabur, which by the early 70's surpassed Aware both in population and in economic importance. Aware was the only city in present-day Ethiopia that the British had established a colony including a sizable military presence and was the seat of the British administration in the Haud prior to Somali independence in 1960.

A series of clashes between the Ethiopian Empire and the Isaaq occurred in Aware in 1959 and ended in a ceasefire.

Aware has dry pasturage. However, the construction of private wells and birkas (underground concrete water tanks), a development which started in the 1950s and later on dramatically increased after the 1970s, offered a solution to the absence of permanent water. While this encouraged birka owners to further diversify traditional animal husbandry beyond camels and small ruminants into water-dependent cattle, this also increased livestock population in an overpopulated region, putting additional pressure on the shrinking resource base; the vicinity of almost every settlement in Aware have become overgrazed by cattle belonging to the villagers, thus driving away ideal nomads raising camels and small ruminants in the eternal search for pasture and water.

=== Insurgency ===
As part of their response to the local insurgency, the Ethiopian army enforced a trade embargo on part of the Somali Region which includes Aware. In early June 2007, a truck transporting goods (sugar, oil, and other food items) from Hargeysa was stopped by a military patrol 12 kilometers from Aware town, near the village of Dud Adaad. The patrol accused the truck's owner of delivering food to the Ogaden National Liberation Front, and confiscated his truck. In mid-September of the same year, three more commercial trucks traveling from Hargeysa to Aware were stopped and confiscated by the army at Bukudhaba village.

== Demographics ==
Based on figures published by the Central Statistical Agency in 2005, this woreda has an estimated total population of 132,149, of whom 61,685 were males and 70,464 were females; 33,582 or 25.41% of its population are urban dwellers, which is greater than the Zone average of 22.3%. Because of its high population and the large territory encompassed, The 2007 Census conducted by the Central Statistical Agency of Ethiopia (CSA) was deemed unsatisfactory due to ongoing war between the ONLF and Ethiopian defense forces with Aware at its epicenter. The 1997 national census reported a total population for this woreda of 103,337, of whom 55,839 were men and 47,498 were women; 22,518 or 21.79% of its population were urban dwellers. The population as of today is most likely around 350,000 as a rough estimate. The largest ethnic group reported in Aware was the Somali.

The town is almost exclusively inhabited by the Isaaq clan-family, specifically the Eidagale sub clan of the Garhajis.
