= List of chief administrators of the Somali Region =

The chief administrator of the Somali Region in Ethiopia is the head of the executive branch of the region. The current chief administrator is Mustafa Mohammed Omar, who has also been the vice chairman of the Somali Democratic Party (SDP), elected in 22 August 2018.

== List of presidents of the Somali Region ==
No.	Portrait	President (Birth–Death)	Term of Office			Party
No.	Portrait	President (Birth–Death)	Took office	Left office	Duration	Party
1		Abdullahi Mohamed Sa'di	23 Jan 1993	Nov 1993	10 Months,	Ogaden National Liberation Front(ONLF).
2		Hassan Jire Qalinle	1993	Apr 1994	2 Year,	Ethiopian Somali Democratic League (ESDL)
3		Abdirahman Ugas Mohumed Qani	Apr 1994	1995	1 Year,	Ethiopian Somali Democratic League (ESDL)
4		Ahmed Makahel Hussein	1995	Jun 1995	4 Months, 15 Days	Ethiopian Somali Democratic League (ESDL)
5		Mahdi Ayoub Guleed	Jun 1995	Jun 1995	Weeks	Ethiopian Somali Democratic League (ESDP).
6		Eid Daahir Farah	Jun 1995	Oct 1997	2 Year, 4 Months	Ethiopian Somali Democratic League (ESDP).
7		Khader Ma'alen Ali	Oct 1997	Oct 2000	3 Years,	Ethiopian Somali Democratic League (ESDL) (until 1998)
7		Khader Ma'alen Ali	Oct 1997	Oct 2000	3 Years,	Ethiopian Somali People's Democratic Party (ESPDP)
8		Abdulrashed Dulane	Oct 2000	21 Jul 2003	2 Years, 10 Months	Ethiopian Somali People's Democratic Party (ESPDP)
9		Abdi Jibril Ali	21 Jul 2003	Oct 2005	2 Years, 3 Months,	Ethiopian Somali People's Democratic Party (ESPDP)
10		Abdullahi Hassan Mohamed ''Lugbuur''	Oct 2005	Nov 2008	3 Years, 1 Months	Ethiopian Somali People's Democratic Party (ESPDP)
11		Daud Mohamed Ali '' Daud Axmaar''	Nov 2008	12 Jul 2010	1 Year, 9 Months	Ethiopian Somali People's Democratic Party (ESPDP)
12		Abdi Mohamoud Omar (Cabdi Ilay)	12 Jul 2010	08 Aug 2018	8 Years, 1 Months	Ethiopian Somali People's Democratic Party (ESPDP)
13		Ahmed Abdi Sh.Mohamed (Ilkacase)	08 Aug 2018	22 Aug 2018	14 Days,	Ethiopian Somali People's Democratic Party (ESPDP)
13		Mustafe muhumed Omer (1970–)	22 Aug 2018	Present		Somali People's Democratic Party (ESPDP) (until 03 Apr 2019)
13		Mustafe muhumed Omer (1970–)	22 Aug 2018	Present		Somali Democratic Party (SDP) (until 30 Nov 2019)
13		Mustafe muhumed Omer (1970–)	22 Aug 2018	Present		Prosperity Party
