= Kebri Dahar (woreda) =

District in Somali Region, Ethiopia

Coordinates: 6°55′N 44°10′E

Kebri Dahar (Somali: Qabridahare) is a woreda in the Somali Region of Ethiopia. Part of the Korahe Zone, Kebri Dahar is bordered on the south by Debeweyin, on the west by the Gode Zone, on the northwest by Shekosh, on the north by the Degehabur Zone, on the east by the Werder Zone, and on the southeast by Shilavo. The largest city in Kebri Dahar is Kebri Dahar. The population of Kebri Dahar is 220,000.

The average elevation in this woreda is 706 meters above sea level. The only perennial river in Kebri Dahar is the Fafen River. As of 2008, Kebri Dahar has no all-weather gravel road nor any community roads; about 25.8% of the total population has access to drinking water.

== Demographics ==
Based on the 2007 Census conducted by the Central Statistical Agency of Ethiopia (CSA), this woreda has a total population of 136,142, of whom 77,685 are men and 58,457 women. While 29,241 or 21.48% are urban inhabitants, a further 50,361 or 36.99% are pastoralists. 98.73% of the population said they were Muslim. This woreda is primarily inhabited by the Ogaden clan

The 1997 national census reported a total population for this woreda of 105,565, of whom 59,279 are men and 46,286 are women; 24,263 or 22.98% of its population were urban dwellers. The largest ethnic group reported in Debeweyin was the Somali (97.47%).
