= Mohamed Mooge Liibaan =

Somali musician

Personal details
- Born: Mohamed Mooge Liban; 1945 Hargeisa, Somaliland
- Died: June 1984 (aged 38–39) Dusmo, near Aware, in the Haud region of Ethiopia
- Relations: Ahmed Mooge Liibaan; Abdikarim Ahmed Mooge
- Occupation: Politician; Musician; Poet; Teacher; Military leader
- Profession: Teacher, Artist

Military service
- Allegiance: Somali National Movement (1981–1984); Somaliland (1984)
- Battles/wars
- Military career
- Rank: Commander
- Wars: Somali Civil War

Mohammed Mooge Liibaan (Somali: Maxamed Mooge Liibaan), was a prominent Somali scholar, poet, and military leader.

== Biography ==
=== Early life and career ===
Mohamed Mooge was born in Hargeisa, the present-day capital of Somaliland. He attended primary school in Hargeisa and later completed his intermediate and secondary education at the Ahmed Guray School, which was built during the British Somaliland Protectorate era.

Mooge was a member of the famous Waaberi troupe, the most influential performing arts group in Somalia. He was especially renowned for his skill with the oud and for a vocal style that combined emotional depth with artistic finesse.

Before dedicating himself fully to music, he worked as a teacher for the Somali Ministry of Education. He strongly believed that education was the ultimate tool for establishing fair, progressive society and preserving cultural identity.

=== Military Career and Rebel Leadership ===
Early Defection (1978): Following the aftermath of the 1977 Ogaden War, Mohamed Mooge defected and joined an early movement opposing the central government, temporarily operating out of Addis Ababa.

Founding and Leading the SNM (1981–1984): When the Somali National Movement (SNM) was founded in 1981 and Mohamed became one of its most prominent early military commanders, utilizing his tactical skills, intellect, and profound public respect to lead guerrilla operations along the border regions between Ethiopia and Somaliland.He also worked with Radio Halgan (which later became known as Radio Kulmis), where he contributed to the movement’s political and media activities and conducted various interviews regarding the SNM’s struggle.

=== Involvement in SNM ===
Mohamed Mooge spent an extended period in Dire Dawa, which at the time served as an important base for political and Military movements.Before joining the SNM, he spent three years in other military movements operating in Harar and other regions of Ethiopia. After spending some time in Addis Ababa, Ethiopia,he moved to the city of Jijiga, and from there entered Awarre, Which was then a key operational base for the Somali National Movement (SNM). He became the head of information and political affairs within the organization, leading the SNM’s radio programs and political awareness campaigns. Mooge was described as the driving force behind the SNM's media and information wing, playing a crucial role in spreading its message, organizing cultural programs, and providing advice.

=== Legacy ===
Mohamed Mooge is remembered as one of the most important cultural and political figures in Somali history. His songs, poetry, and performances remain deeply influential across Somali society. Today, he is regarded not only as a musician but also as a nationalist hero, symbolizing both the artistic and political struggles of his people. In Somaliland, his memory is preseverved in cultural institutions, public monuments, and educational centers.

== See also ==
- Mohamed Kahin Ahmed
- Ibrahim Ismail Koodbur
- Aden Mohamoud Guhad
