= Shekosh (woreda) =

Shekosh شكوش Shaygosh
- Location within Ethiopia
- Coordinates: 7°30′N 44°10′E
- Country: Ethiopia
- Region: Somali
- Zone: Korahe

Population
  - Total: 114,981
- Time zone: UTC+3

Shekosh is a woreda in the Somali Region of Ethiopia, part of the Korahe region. It is bordered on the southeast by Kebri Dahar, on the west by the Fiq Zone, and on the north by the Degehabur Zone. The major town in Shekosh district is Wijiwaaji; the district also includes other villages such as Goomaar, Biyoley, Radooyo, Geladid and Geringon.

The only perennial river in Shekosh is the Fafen with large valley good for farming. Constructed a 106-kilometer asphalt road between the town of Shekosh and Degehabur was started by March 2009, now is in use. Local inhabitants constitute half of the 1,100 workers employed by the project.

== Demographics ==
Based on the 2007 Census conducted by the Central Statistical Agency of Ethiopia (CSA), this district has a total population of 48,879, of whom 26,150 are men and 22,729 women. While 4,083 or 8.35% are urban inhabitants, a further 30,394 or 62.18% are pastoralists. 99.32% of the population said they were Muslim.

The 1997 national census reported a total population for this woreda of 24,874, of whom 14,136 were men and 10,738 were women; 3,792 or 15.24% of its population were urban dwellers. The largest ethnic group reported in Shekosh was the Somali people (99.92%). the main inhabitants are Somali.

The clans residing in the town of Sheygosh include the Ogaden clan, particularly the Reer Cabdille sub-clan, and the Dir, Surre clan( Xer), specifically the Fiqi-Yaxye and Fiqi Khayre sub-clans.

== Schools ==
There are two primary schools in Shekosh district, the first one was built in 1974. In 1973, the Ethiopian monarchy chose randomly to build two primary schools for two districts in the Ogaden region. Shekosh won building one School, and other one Shilavo district. Building of the second school came after The Netherlands donated funds for constructing College the Somali regional state of Ethiopia in 1994.

First Somali state of Ethiopia parliamentarians approved buildings of Shekosh college money donated by The Netherlands. The Parliaments selected Shekosh district, because it located in the centre of the state. The college was wilful to benefit equally the students from the nine regions consist the Somali state of Ethiopia.

The college was planned to be the main secondary education provider for students from the nine regions in the Somali state of Ethiopia. The parliament passed an article set for constructing the college at Shekosh district. The college has a capacity of 1,500 students for education as well as shelter and food to last four years.

With the completion of one part of the college, the Netherlands left the project and the Ethiopian authority halted the original plan. Ethiopia's justification was that the Somali region is a conflicted area and that Shekosh itself is a remote and unsafe area.
