= 1959 Aware Clashes =

Skirmishes in Haud Region, Ethiopian Empire

- Part of The Isaaq migrations
Date	November-December 1959
Location	Aware (woreda), Haud, Ethiopian Empire
Result	ceasefire

Belligerents
Ethiopian Empire; Ogaden Somalis	Isaaq Tribesmen: Arap isaaqs; Habr Awal isaaqs

Commanders and leaders
Germame Neway; Ethiopian corporal †	unknown

Strength
unknown	300 tribesmen

Casualties and losses
several Ethiopian troops killed 3 vehicles captured	several

The 1959 Aware Clashes were a series of skirmishes in late November and early December 1959 in the Aware region of the Haud, near the border between British Somaliland and Ethiopian Empire between Isaaq tribesmen, mainly Arap and Habr Awal Isaaqs, and Ethiopian troops.

== Clashes ==
In 1954, Britain and Ethiopia signed the Anglo-Ethiopian Agreement, which transferred administrative control of the Haud to Imperial Ethiopia while guaranteeing grazing rights to British-protected Somali tribes, a legal transfer strongly opposed by local Somali clans who viewed the area as their territory. On November 29, 1959, members of the Arap Isaaq tribe from the Somaliland Protectorate launched an attack against members of the Ogaden tribe from Ethiopia in the Awareh area of the Haud, a territory where British-protected Somalis maintained recognized grazing rights. This initial inter-tribal clash resulted in the death of one Ogaden Somali and the looting of livestock. Shortly thereafter, Ethiopian security forces proceeded directly to the area under the mandate of restoring order. However, as state security forces intervened, further fighting erupted between the armed troops and the local tribesmen. The Ethiopian forces met seven armed Habr Awal tribesmen. Fire was exchanged and one Habr Awal was killed and one Ethiopian Police Corporal who was wounded died later. Two Habr Awal tribesmen were captured with their arms and the Ethiopian force then returned to Awareh. By the end of these subsequent engagements, the total death toll mounted to six, claiming the lives of three Ethiopian security personnel and three Arap pastoralists. Next morning a force of about thirty-five Ethiopian Police and Frontier Guards left Awareh, and a fight took place with some three hundred Somali tribesmen, mainly Arap, at a point about fifteen miles north-west of Awareh. The Ethiopians have reported that four of their men were killed, three wounded and three rifles lost. Somali casualties were three killed and three wounded. Two Ethiopian vehicles and one were lost.

== Aftermath ==
In the aftermath, the Ethiopian District Governor and British liaison staff initiated joint investigations on the ground to prevent additional hostilities, while the incident triggered intense Parliamentary debates in London regarding the security of British-protected clans grazing across the frontier and the underlying friction caused by the 1954 Anglo-Ethiopian Agreement.
