= Guled Casowe =

Ethiopian politician (born 1978)

- Guled Casowe Jijiga, Ethiopia.
- Born: 15 May 1978 (age 47); Jijiga, Ethiopia

Guled Casowe (Somali: Guuleed Casoowe, (born 15 May 1978) is a Somali political leader.

== Early life ==
Guled Casowe was born in 1978 in the valley of Jijiga. His birth marked the defeat of the Somali army in the Ethio-Somali war. He belongs to the Ogaden sub-clan of the Darod clan family. Guled and his family fled to Somalia and resided in Mogadishu.

Guled grew up in Mogadishu. His hero was his maternal aunt. By age eleven, Guled had memorized the entire Qur'an (he was a hafiz), and displayed all the qualities of a promising leader. He continued his religious and secular education.

He undertook primary education in Mogadishu, where he attended Mohamoud Harbi Primary and Junior School and Central Mogadishu Secondary School. After the downfall of Somali dictator Mohamed Siad Barre and the start of the Somali Civil War. Casowe returned to his homeland and resettled in Jijiga.

Casowe attended Ethiopian Civil Service College, where he earned an LLB Degree with distinction. He completed his master's degree from Greenwich University. He attended Masters of Transformational Leadership and Change Agent Leader at International Leadership Institute in 2009.

== Career ==
Casowe worked in various governmental agencies. From 2001–2003, he worked at the Somali State Justice and General Persecution Bureau as Legal Expert. In 2003–2004, he was appointed Legal Adviser of the Somali Regional State Council of People's Representative. In 2005, he was nominated as the presiding Judge of the Korahe Zonal Court in Kebri Dahar. After a year in Korahe, he was promoted as chairing judge at the Cassation Bench in the Somali Regional State Supreme Court in Jijiga. At the end of 2009, Casowe was appointed Minister of Information, Culture & Tourism in Somali Regional State.

As Information Minister, he established the first independent FM radio and Regional TV networks. He began rebuilding the Castle of Mohammed Abdullah Hassan. In the middle of 2009, He helped the Somali Regional State administration locate and exhume the remains of Mohammed Abdullah Hassan to rebury him in his old castle at Imme. Casowe promoted the use of DNA samples to determine whether the remains they found in a graveyard at Gindhir.

In 2019, he founded Geedka Nabada (Peace Tree) to provide news and analysis from the Horn of Africa. This platform promotes peace, culture and the good image of Somali State.
