= Rabaso =

Rabaso Rabaso
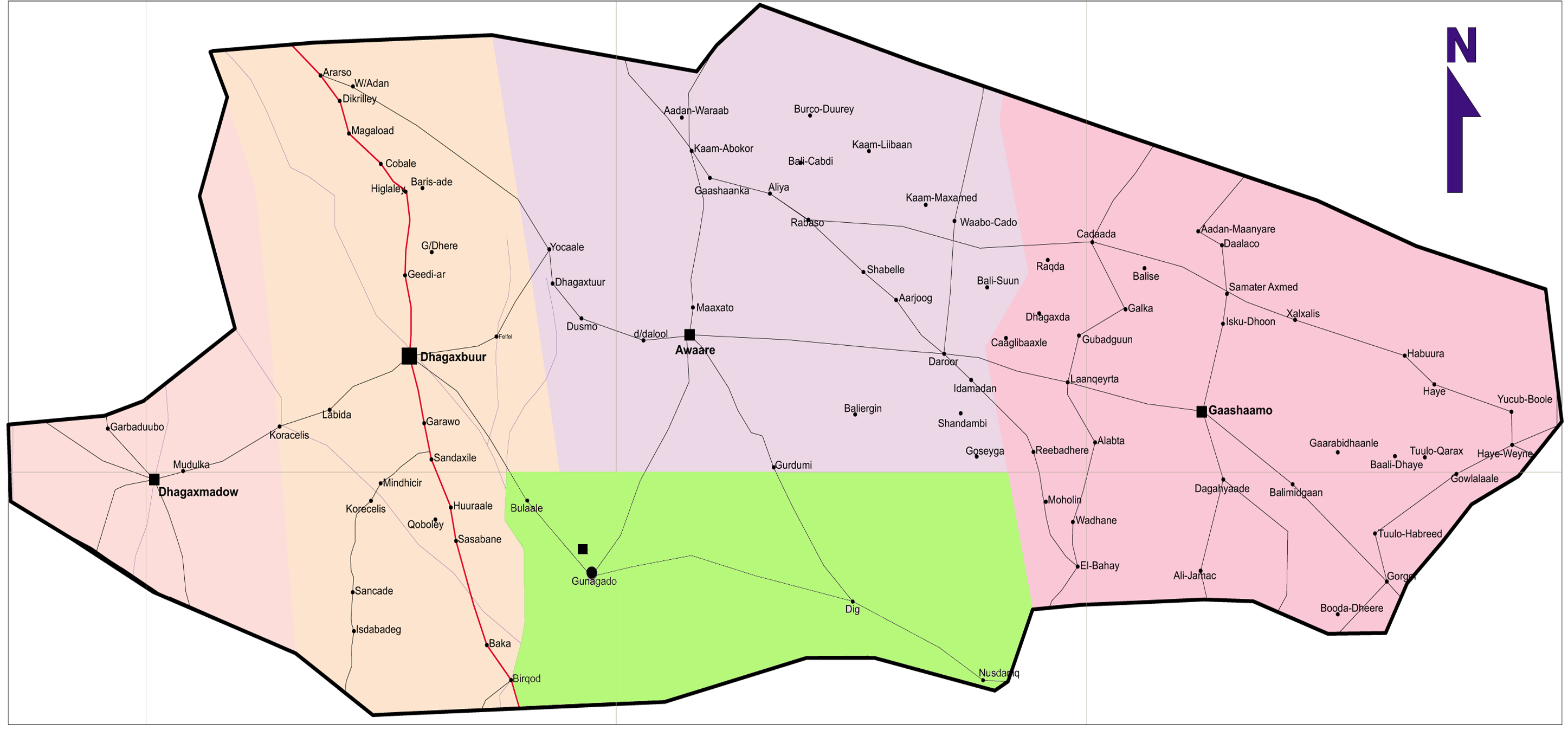
- Map of Jarar Zone

- Location within Ethiopia
- Coordinates: 8°28′28″N 44°24′27″E
- Country: Ethiopia
- Region: Somali
- Zone: Jarar zone
- Elevation: 1,095 m (3,593 ft)

Population (2007)
  - Total: 4,042
- Time zone: UTC+3 (EAT)

Rabaso (Somali: Rabaso), is a town in the Daror of Ethiopia. Part of the Jarar zone, Rabaso is bordered on the south by Aware, on the west by Daror, on the north by the Burco-Duuray, on the northeast by Somaliland, and on the east by Shabelle. Nearby town include Celiyo, and Duduma Cad.

== History ==
According to the 2007 census conducted by the Central Statistical Agency of Ethiopia (CSA) the town had a population of 4,042. In 2005 Daroor had 40,000 inhabitants, according to the Ethiopian Central Statistical Agency. In 1997 of 9,397 inhabitants 99,47% of these were Somali, and 50 residents were from other ethnic groups. In 1988 a refugee camp was set up for Somalis. The refugee camp housed predominantly members of the Eidagale clan of the Isaaq clans from nearby Somaliland. The camp was poorly equipped. The camp's population fell from around 32.000 on 12.000 in September 1994. After renewed fighting in November, the population rose to 49.000. At the end of 2001 / the beginning of 2002 the camp was closed after most refugees voluntarily went home.

The economy of the place was strongly affected when the Saudi Arabian 1998 import of cattle from northeast Africa stopped.

== Demographics ==
Based on the 2007 Census conducted by the Central Statistical Agency of Ethiopia, 100% of the population said they were Muslim. The Center is inhabited by the Abdiraham Musa subclan of the Eidagale clan of the Isaaq clan.

The 1997 national census reported that 21.79% of its population were urban dwellers. The largest ethnic group reported was the Somali.

== Education ==
Rabaso has two schools. One is Primary and Intermediate school and the other is Secondary School.
