= Degehabur (woreda) =

District in Somali Region, Ethiopia

- Location within Ethiopia
- Coordinates: 8°13′N 43°34′E
- Country: Ethiopia
- Region: Somali
- Zone: Degehabur
- Elevation: 1,044 m (3,425 ft)

Population (2020)
  - Total: 530 000
- Time zone: UTC+3 (EAT)

Degehabur (Somali: Dhagaxbuur) is a woreda in Somali Region, Ethiopia. Part of the Degehabur Zone, Degehabur is bordered on the southeast by the Gunagado and Korahe Zone, on the southwest by the Fiq Zone, on the west by Degehamedo, on the north by the Jijiga Zone, and on the east by Aware; it is frequently considered part of the Haud. The administrative center of this woreda is Degehabur.

The two perennial rivers in Degehabur are the Fafen and the Jerer. As of 2008, Degehabur has 68 kilometers of asphalt, 62 of all-weather gravel road, and 387 of community roads; about 24.4% of the total population has access to drinking water.

This woreda was reported in October 1974 to have been the area worst hit by the Hararghe famine.

== Demographics ==
Based on the 2007 Census conducted by the Central Statistical Agency of Ethiopia (CSA), this woreda has a total population of 115,555, of whom 65,081 are men and 50,474 women. While 30,027 or 25.99% are urban inhabitants, a further 45,818 or 39.65% are pastoralists. 98.6% of the population said they were Muslim.

The 1994 national census reported a total population for this woreda of 93,019, of whom 51,729 were men and 41,290 were women; 28,708 or 30.86% were urban inhabitants. The largest ethnic group reported in Degehabur was the Somali people (98.71%).
