= Shilavo =

Town in Somali Region, Ethiopia

Shilabo
- Town
- Location within Ethiopia
- Coordinates: 6°6′N 44°46′E
- Country: Ethiopia
- Region: Somali
- Zone: Korahe

Government
- Elevation: 395 m (1,296 ft)
- Time zone: UTC+3 (EAT)

Shilabo (Somali: Shilaabo; also spelled "Scilave", "Shelabo") is a town in eastern Ethiopia, in the Korahe Zone of the Somali Region. It is the administrative center of Shilavo woreda.

== History ==
During the Second Italo-Ethiopian War, Shilavo was a sight of a fierce battle between the Ethiopians under Afawarq Walda Samayat and the Somali dubats under Rodolfo Graziani. The losses were heavy for both sides, but the Ethiopians were outnumbered and eventually forced to retreat.

During the 1963 Ogaden rebellion, Shilaabo was blockaded and shelled by the Ethiopian Imperial Army as a reprisal for local support to the insurgency.

Somali military units supported the Western Somali Liberation Front's attack on an Ethiopian military unit outside Shilavo in June 1982, which led to a renewal of hostilities between the two countries.

The former President of neighbouring Somalia, Maj. General Mohamed Siyad Barre, was born in Shilaabo, although he later claimed he was born in Garbahaarreey so he would be eligible to serve in the Italian colonial police force.

The mayor of Shilabo, Mahdi Badal Omar was arrested in July 1995, for allegedly being a member of the Ogaden National Liberation Front.

== Demographics ==
Based on 2005 figures from the Central Statistical Agency, Shilavo has an estimated total population of 7,239 of whom 3,877 are men and 3,362 are women. The 1997 census reported this town had a total population of 4,853 of whom 2,561 were men and 2,383 women. The largest ethnic group reported in this town was the Somali (98.95%)1994 Population and Housing Census of Ethiopia: Results for Somali Region, Vol. 1 Tables 2.4, 2.13 (accessed 10 January 2009). The results of the 1994 census in the Somali Region were not satisfactory, so the census was repeated in 1997.
