= Degehabur =

Town in Somali Region, Ethiopia

Degehabur ደገሃቡር Dhagaxbuur (Somali)
- Town
- Location within Ethiopia
- Coordinates: 8°13′N 43°34′E
- Country: Ethiopia
- Region: Somali
- Zone: Degehabur
- Elevation: 1,044 m (3,425 ft)

Population (2016)
  - Total: 230,000
- Time zone: UTC+3 (EAT)

Degehabur (Somali: Dhagaxbuur) is a town in the region of Somali galbeed in Ethiopia. It is located in the Jarar Zone of Somali galbeed. Degehabur sits at 1044 meters above sea level. The town is the administrative center of Degehabur woreda.

The Degehabur consists of 11 districts and the oldest one is the Aware district, others are Yo’ale, Gashamo, Gunagado, Dig, Bir, Ilbur etc.

Local landmarks include the white mosque of Degehabur, which Anthony Mockler described as "the most important in the Somali Region." The NGO Doctors without Borders operates a clinic in Degehabur. The upgrade of the 165-kilometer road between Degahabur and the Regional capital, Jijiga, to an all-weather asphalt road, was announced to be almost complete on 31 October 2007, with the remaining 40 kilometers awaiting completion. Construction of a 106-kilometer asphalt road between Degehabur and the town of Shekoosh was underway by March 2009. Local inhabitants constitute half of the 1,100 workers employed by the project.

== History ==
During the nineteenth century, Degehabur was an important stopping point for caravans crossing the Haud for Hargeisa and Berbera, but when Major H.G.C. Swayne travelled through the area in 1893, he found it abandoned and uses it as an example of the destruction caused by "the insecurity resulting from inter-tribal feuds." According to Swayne, at the time of his visit "there were formerly many square miles of jowdri cultivation, which has been abandoned within the last few years, and now there is only left an immense area of stubble and the ruins of the village. Dagahbur used to be a thriving settlement of one thousand five hundred inhabitants ... now not a hut is left."

In the 1920s Degehabur started to recover. It was said that there were some two hundred villages within the distance of a day's travel and that these used the market at Degehabur. By 1931 there were motorable roads in five directions out from the town. Wealthy inhabitants had started erecting two-story buildings.

In 1927, Ethiopian soldiers attacked the British governor of Somaliland while he was in Degehabur on a hunting trip, killing eight of his bodyguards. The British Government protested but was met with little response from Ras Tafari, who claimed that he was not able to keep some of his men in order.

Due to its strategic location, Degehabur used as by Dejazmach Nasibu Emmanual as his headquarters at the beginning of the Second Italo-Abyssinian War. Despite the construction of a series of fortifications south of the town, the Italians under General Rodolfo Graziani defeated the Ethiopian defenders in the Battle of the Ogaden, and occupied Degehabur 30 April 1936. In the East African campaign in World War II, the Nigerian Brigade drove the Italians from the town in March 1941.

During the 1960s, Ethiopian Emperor Haile Selassie responded to the 1963–1965 Ogaden rebellion with brutal and repressive crackdowns against the Somalis in the Ogaden region. Most infamous of these reprisals was on the town of Degehabur in what became known locally as the "Kanone Massacre". Degehabur was bombarded by artillery from nearby high ground, which was followed by a killing spree when army troops later entered the settlement. Degahabur was defended by the 11th Brigade of the Ethiopian Army at the beginning of the Ogaden War, until the unit was ordered at the end of July 1977 to withdraw to Jijiga. It was recaptured by the 69th Brigade and the Third Cuban Tank Brigade 6 March 1978.

Haji Ahmed nur Sheikh Mumin, imam of the Degehabur mosque, was one of those arrested in 1994 for supporting the Ogaden National Liberation Front (ONLF). Amnesty International reported in 1996 that he was still in prison waiting for court trial. On 28 May 2007, during the celebration of Ginbot 20 (celebrating the downfall of the Derg), Degehabur and Jijiga were the scenes of attacks on civilians and government officials. At least 16 people were killed and 67 injured; one of the injured was Abdulahi Hassan Mohammed, president of the Somali Region, who was speaking at the ceremony. The Ethiopian government blamed the attack on the ONLF, who afterward denied responsibility for the attack.

Partly in response to this attack, the Ethiopian Army began confiscating commercial vehicles that moved goods into the conflict-affected zones of Somali Region. In May 2007 the last major trade convoy left Hargeysa, consisting of 18 trucks stocked with food items and clothing. This convoy stopped near Degehabur and all 18 trucks were confiscated by the army and taken to the military base in that town. At the end of September 2007, four months later, according to their owners, all 18 trucks were still impounded at the military base.

== Demographics ==
Based on figures from the Central Statistical Agency in 2007, Degehabur has an estimated total population of 150 000 of whom 85 000 are men and 65 000 are women. The 1997 census reported this town had a total population of 28,708 of whom 14,976 were men and 13,732 women. The largest two ethnic groups reported in this town were the Somali (98.45%), all other ethnic groups made up the remaining 1.55% of the residents.

== Education ==
Cumar Binu Khadaab

One of the first private schools in Degehabur, Jarar is Cumar Binu khadaab primary and secondary schools. It was established in the 2008–2009 academic year and was started with only four grades, grades one to four. The number of enrolled students in the second year of the school was massive and suddenly the school became popular in and around the town. The school's population and popularity grew in such a short period of time. As for now, in 2023, the school has two primary schools, and a secondary school, and is in the process of making a university. The two classes that this school offers that are not taught in other schools are Arabic and Islamic Studies. This is because non-Muslim students attend other schools but this school is for Muslims.
