= Su'ad Ahmed Farah =

Ethiopian politician

Ma'am Su'ad Ahmed Farah
- Sucaad Axmed Faarax

Personal details
- Party: Ethiopian Somali People's Democratic Party
- Profession: Regional Vice-President of the Somali Region

Su'ad Ahmed Farah or Ma'am Su'ad Ahmed Farah (in Somali as Marwo Sucaad Axmed Faarax), is the regional vice-president of one of the nine divisions (kililoch) of Ethiopia: The Somali regional state. She is a member of the Somali regional parliament and a member of the ruling party; the Ethiopian Somali People's Democratic Party (ESPDP).
