= Debeweyin =

Coordinates: 6°10′N 44°20′E

Debeweyin (Somali: Dabaweyn) is one of the woredas in the Somali Region of Ethiopia. Part of the Korahe Zone, Debeweyin is bordered on the southwest by the Gode Zone, on the north by Kebri Dahar, and on the east by Shilavo. The major town in Debeweyin is Har Ad.

The only perennial river in this woreda is the Fafen. As of 2008, Debeweyin has 60 kilometers of all-weather gravel road and 2114 kilometers of community roads and about 25.8% of the total population has access to drinking water.

== Demographics ==
Based on the 2007 Census conducted by the Central Statistical Agency of Ethiopia (CSA), this woreda has a total population of 70,102, of whom 40,708 are men and 29,394 women. While 9,359 or 13.35% are urban inhabitants, a further 31,449 or 44.86% are pastoralists. 99.09% of the population said they were Muslim. This woreda is primarily inhabited by the Ogaden clan of the Somali people.

The 1997 national census reported a total population for this woreda of 68,481, of whom 40,831 were men and 27,650 were women; 4,318 or 6.31% of its population were urban dwellers. The largest ethnic group reported in Debeweyin was the Somali (99.58%).
