= Eidagale =

Somali clan

Eidgale عيدَ جلي
- Isaaq Somali Clan
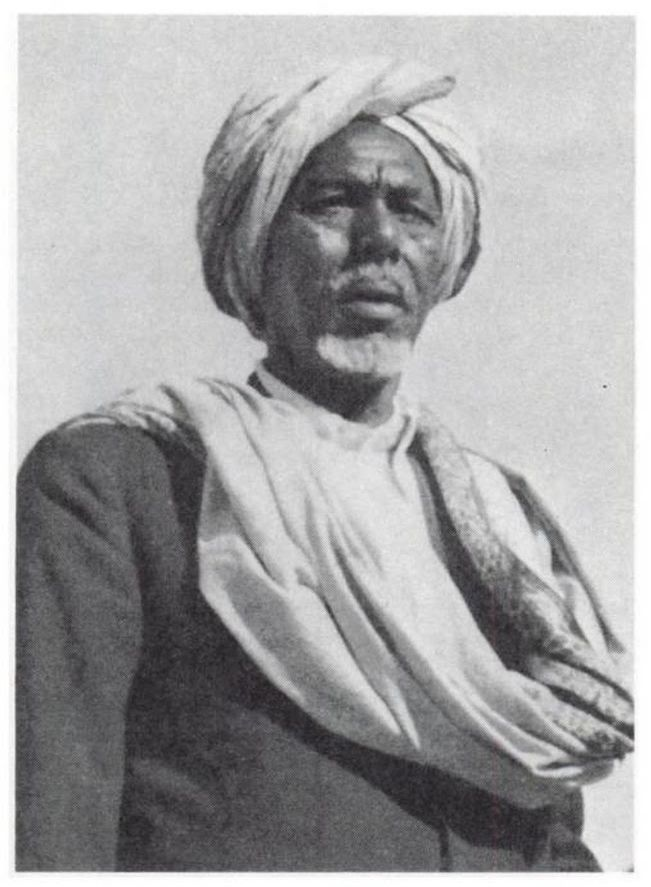
- Abdillahi Deria, fifth Grand Sultan of the Isaaq Sultanate
- Ethnicity: (Somaliland) Somali
- Location: Somaliland; Somaliland; Ethiopia (Somali Region)
- Descended from: Daoud ibn Al-Qādhī Ismā'īl ibn Sheikh Isḥāq ibn Aḥmad
- Parent tribe: Garhajis (Isma'il)
- Branches: Mohammed Daoud; Musa Daoud; Abu Bakr Daoud
- Language: (Somaliland) Somali (Arab League) Arabic
- Religion: Sunni, Islam

The Eidagalle (Somali: Ciidagalle; Arabic: عيدَجلي) is a major Somali clan of the Isaaq clan family. Members of this clan are concentrated in Somaliland and the Somali region. They are the traditional holders of the Isaaq Sultanate since the 18th century. As descendants of Ismail bin Sheikh Isaaq, its members form a part of the Habar Magaadle confederation, and they constitute the largest sub-clan of the Isaaq. They traditionally consist of nomadic pastoralists, merchants and skilled poets.

== Distribution ==
The Eidagalle, largely clan make up a significant percentage of the population in Maroodi Jeex region of Somaliland, as well as the Daroor, Aware and Misraq Gashamo zones in the Somali region of Ethiopia. They also live on the middle and south eastern side of Hargeisa as well as the Salahlay District in eastern Maroodi Jeex region. A subclan of the Eidagale, the Guuyoobe also inhabit the Oodweyne district in Togdheer region. They also have a large settlement in Kenya where they are known as a constituent segment of the Isahakia community.

== Etymology ==
The Eidagale clan traces its lineage back to Ismail Sheikh Ishaq. Within the Eidagale clan, there are three prominent sons: Mohammed Daoud, Abu Bakr Daoud, and Musa Daoud. The Eidagale are further classified into four sub-tribes: Abu Bakr Musa, Abdelrahman Musa, Abu Bakr Daoud and Mohammed Daoud. Historically, the Eidagale were nomadic pastoralists, merchants, and skilled poets.

== History ==
=== Lineage ===
Sheikh Ishaq was one of the scholars that crossed the sea from Arabia to the Horn of Africa to spread Islam around 12th to 13th century. Hence, Sheikh Ishaaq married two local women in Somaliland that left him eight sons, one of them being Ismail (Garhajis).

=== Medieval period ===
Historically the Eidagalle took part in the conquest of Abyssinia and were part of the Adal Sultanate and are mentioned in the book Futuh al-Habasha (Conquest of Abyssinia) as the Habar Magaadle . The Habar Magaadle are known for producing a historical figure known as Ahmad Gurey bin Husain who was the right-hand man of Ahmad ibn Ibrahim al-Ghazi.

I. M. Lewis discusses the existence of another leader named Ahmad Gurey, and suggests that the two leaders have been conflated into one historical figure:

The text refers to two Ahmad's with the nickname 'Left-handed'. One is regularly presented as 'Ahmad Guray, the Somali' (...) identified as Ahmad Gurey Xuseyn, chief of the Habar Magaadle. Another reference, however, appears to link the Habar Magadle with the Eidagal. The other Ahmad is simply referred to as 'Imam Ahmad' or simply the 'Imam'.This Ahmad is not qualified by the adjective Somali (...) The two Ahmad's have been conflated into one figure, the heroic Ahmed Guray

For centuries, the tomb of sheikh Aw Barkhadle, which is located between Berbera and Hargeisa, was used by the Isaaq clans to settle disputes and to swear oaths of alliances under a holy relic attributed to Bilal Ibn Rabah. As traditional leaders of the Isaaq clans, the Eidagale placed themselves as mediators during the disputes.

When any grave question arises affecting the interests of the Isaakh tribe in general. On a paper yet carefully preserved in the tomb, and bearing the sign-manual of Belat [Bilal], the slave of one of the early khaleefehs, fresh oaths of lasting friendship and lasting alliances are made...In the season of 1846 this relic was brought to Berbera in charge of the Haber Gerhajis, and on it the rival tribes of Aial Ahmed and Aial Yunus swore to bury all animosity and live as brethren.

The Eidagalle were renowned for their equestrian skills, and their devastating raids extended between the coast and the interior. According to Swayne, who traversed through Somaliland in the late 19th century, the Eidagalle were amongst the clans most addicted to raiding:

The tribes near the northern coast most addicted to raiding appear to be the Habr Awal, the Eidagalle, and the Habr Gerhajis.

Apart from their equestrian skills, the Eidagalle are also famed for their eloquence in traditional Somali poetry (gabay), producing many famous poets such as Xasan Tarabi and Elmi Boodhari. Historically, the Eidagale were viewed as "the recognized experts in the composition of poetry" by their fellow Somali contemporaries:

Among the tribes, the Eidagalle are the recognized experts in the composition of poetry. One individual poet of the Eidagalle may be no better than a good poet of another tribe, but the Eidagalla appear to have more poets than any other tribe. "if you had a hundred Eidagalle men here," Hersi Jama once told me, "And asked which of them could sing his own gabei ninety-five would be able to sing. The others would still be learning."

For centuries, the Eidagalle were influential stakeholders in the long-distance Somali caravan trade. Eidagalle merchants procured various goods from the Somali Region in present-day Ethiopia, such as livestock, acacia gum, myrrh and ghee, which were subsequently exported to Southern Arabia. The Eidagale caravan merchants founded several inland trade entrepôts in the interior, which also includes the modern city of Hargeisa, founded in the 19th century as a caravan junction between Berbera and the Somali interior.

Somalis of the Habr Gerhajis tribe arrive from Ogadain with feathers, myrrh, gum, sheep, cattle, and ghee, carrying away in exchange piece goods; they also make four trips in the season; they remain for less than a month, and during their stay reside with fellow-tribesmen, taking their meals in the mokhbâzah or eating-house.

=== Isaaq Sultanate ===
The Eidagalle are the traditional holders of the Isaaq Sultanate since the 18th century. The Isaaq Sultanate was established in the mid-18th century by Sultan Guled Abdi Eisa of the Eidagale clan. His coronation took place after the victorious battle of Lafaruug, in which Guled Abdi successfully led the Isaaq and was crowned by the Isaaq clan after defeating the Absame tribes. After witnessing his leadership skills, noble conduct and valiance, the Isaaq chiefs recognized him as their Grand Sultan but Abdi instead put forward his son Guled. Guled's Sultanate predates the Habr Yunis Sultanate, which broke off from Eidagale tutelage several decades after the start of his rule. Sultan Guled ruled the Isaaq from the 1750s up until his death in the early 19th century, where he was succeeded by his eldest son Farah. Sultan Farah further expanded the influence of the Sultanate by establishing ties with various Muslim polities across the Gulf, particularly the Al-Qasimi family whom he corresponded with in regard to military action against the British Navy who blockaded Berbera and temporarily cut off vital trade.

=== Sultans of the Eidagalle (and the Isaaq) ===
	Name	Reign From	Reign Till
-	Guled Abdi (Traditional Chief)	Mid ~1700s	Mid ~1700s
1	Sultan Guled Abdi (First Sultan)	late ~1700s	1808
2	Sultan Farah Sultan Guled	1808	1845
3	Sultan Hassan Sultan Farah	1845	1870
4	Sultan Diriye Sultan Hassan	1870	1939
5	Sultan Abdillahi Sultan Diriye	1939	1967
6	Sultan Rashid Sultan Abdilahi	1967	1969
7	Sultan Abdiqadir Sultan Abdilahi	1969	1975
8	Sultan Mohamed Sultan Abdikadir	1975	2021
9	Sultan Daud Sultan Mohamed	2021	

== Clan tree ==
A summarized clan family tree of the Eidagalle is presented below.

- Sheikh Ishaaq
  - Habar Habuusheed
    - Ahmed (Tol-Ja'lo)
    - Muuse (Habr Je'lo)
    - Ibrahiim (Sanbuur)
    - Muhammad ('Ibraan)
  - Habar Magaadle
    - Abdirahman (Habr Awal)
    - Ayub
    - Muhammad (Arap)
    - Ismail (Garhajis)
      - Daoud (Eidagalle)
        - Mohamed Daoud (Guyobe)
          - Ali Mohamed
          - Urkurag Mohamed
            - Ali Urkurag
              - Ismail Ali (Gadhwayn)
              - Fiqi Sa'ad Ali
              - Mahamoud Ali
              - Ahmed Ali
        - Abokor Daoud
          - Issa Abokor
          - Bilaal Abokor
        - Muse Daoud
          - Abokor Muse
          - Abdirahman Muse
            - Yunis Abdirahman (Rer Yunis)(Dan-Wadaago)
            - Abdulle Abdirahman
              - Mohamed Abdulle (Ba Delo)(Dan-Wadaago)
              - Ibrahim Abdulle
                - Kul Ibrahim
                  - Abdi Ibrahim (Abdi Dheere) (Baho Deeqsi)
                - Abokor Ibrahim
                  - Iidle Abokor (Rer Iidle) (Baho Deeqsi)
                  - Hussein Abokor Matan (Gaashabuur)
                    - Hamud Matan
                    - Roble Matan
                    - Adan Matan
                      - Burale Adan
                        - Abane Adan
                        - Muse Adan
                        - Barre Adan
                        - Ergin Adan
                        - Wais Adan
                        - Abdille Adan
                        - Damal Adan
                          - Gobdon Damal
                            - Deria Damal (Dhamal Yar Yar)
                            - Fatah Damal (Dhamal Yar Yar)
                            - Gabib Damal (Dhamal Yar Yar)
                            - Hode Damal (Dhamal Yar Yar)
                            - Esa Damal
                              - Liban Esa
                              - Hassan Esa
                              - Abdi Esa
                                - Abdi bari
                                - Aden Abdi
                                - Guled Abdi
                                  - Yusuf Guled
                                  - Roble Guled
                                  - Jama Guled
                                  - Deria Guled
                                  - Egal Guled
                                  - Gatah Guled
                                  - Farah Guled
                                  - Dualeh Guled
                                  - Abdi Guled
                                  - Ali Guled
                                  - Warfaa Guled

== Notable people ==
- Faysal Ali Warabe – chairman of UCID party (Justice and Development party of Somaliland)
- Hussein Mohammed Adam (Tanzania) – foremost Somali intellectual and scholar who founded the Somali Studies International Association (SSIA)
- Mohammed Mooge Liibaan – prominent Somali instrumentalist, vocalist, and poet.
- Ahmed Mooge Liibaan – prominent Somali musician and singer
- Khadra Dahir Cige – popular Somali singer
- Jama Mohamed Ghalib – served as speaker of the Somali Parliament during the Somali Republic's early civilian administration, between 1960 and 1964
- Mahamed Abdiqadir – 8th grand sultan of the Isaaq
- Ismail Mahmud Hurre – former foreign minister of the Transitional Federal Government of Somalia, between 2000-2002 and 2006–2007
- Hussein Mohamed Jiciir – former mayor of Hargeisa from 2003 to 2012 and one of the longest-serving mayors in the history of Somaliland
- Daud Mahamed – the ninth and current grand sultan of the Isaaq Sultanate.
- Hussein Arab Isse – former deputy prime minister and minister of defence of Somalia, between 2011 and 2012
- Abdikarim Ahmed Mooge Liibaan – Is Somali politician and the current mayor of Hargeisa city
