= Qubi =

Qubi is a district in Erer Zone formerly known Nogob in the Somali Regional State of Ethiopia. It has border with Oromia region`s east Harage.
