= Marsin =

Marsin may refer to:

- Marsin (woreda), a district of Somali Region, Ethiopia
- Marsin, plural demonym for people from Marsa, Malta
- Daniel Marsin (born 1951), French politician
- Ferdinand de Marsin (1656–1706), French general and diplomat

== See also ==
- Mersin, a city in Turkey
