= Mayaa-muluqo =

- District
- Location within Ethiopia
- Country: Ethiopia

Mayaa-muluqo is a district of Somali Region in Ethiopia. It is located in the Erer zone of the Somali region. It is mainly inhabited by the Murule sub-clan of the Gugundhabe Hawiye clan.
