= Ibrahim Ismail Koodbur =

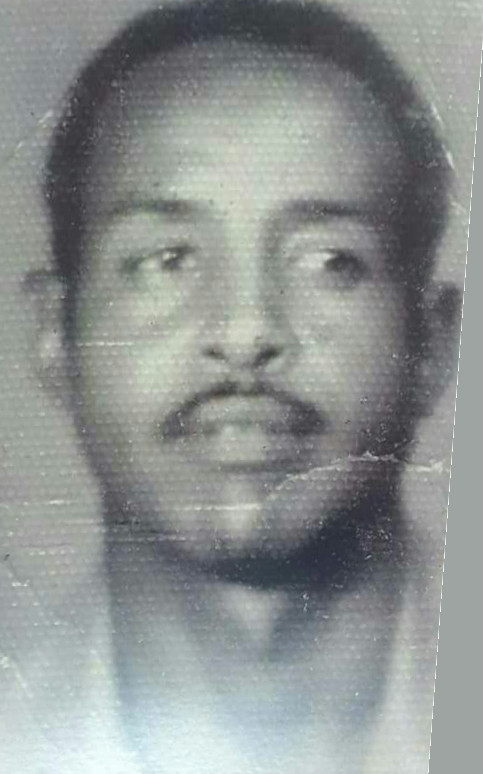
- Died: 1987; Rabaso
- Political party: Somali National Movement (SNM)

Ibrahim Ismail Koodbur (Somali: Ibraahim Ismaaciil Maxamed (Koodbuur); – 1987) is an early member of Somali National Movement (SNM). He died in 1987, before the restoration of Somaliland's independence.

== Biography ==
Koodbur was born in the Eidagale clan of the Isaaq clan family.

Ibrahim Koodbur received his primary education in Hargeisa, followed by secondary education at the Sheikh and Farah Oomaar, where he graduated in 1972. He then joined the Somali National Army as a cadet and went to Russia for military training, completing his military training in 1977.

=== Operation Birjeex ===
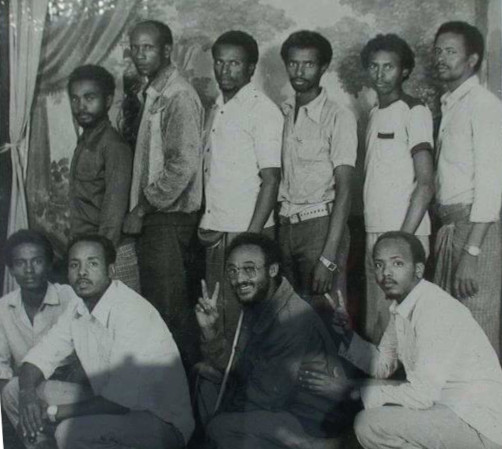
Members after the rescue operation. Front row, second from right is rescued Askar; to his left is Koodbur.

On April 10, 1983, SNM Colonel Abdillahi Askar was captured by the 26th Sector of Hargeisa, Somali armed forces. He was scheduled to be publicly executed the next day.

At the time, Koodbur was secretly involved in the SNM and was also the public relations officer for the 26th Sector of the Somali armed forces Hargeisa. SNM rescued Askar with a force of 11, including Koodbur. During this operation, Koodbur was temporarily detained, and two of his fellow workers were killed.

=== SNM Leader ===
In 1983, the SNM decided to create a local Somaliland military committee in addition to its headquarters in London. Its members were Lihle, Abdillahi Askar, Aadan Salebaan, Ibrahim Koodbuur and Hassan Yonis Habane.

From 1984 to 1985, Koodbur was one of the leaders of SNM.

=== Death ===
Koodbur died in Rabaso in 1987. Possibly poisoned by the Siad Barre regime.

== Family ==
- Zamzam Abdi Adan - Wife.

== See also ==
- Ibrahim Kodbuur District
