= Xammar =

Xammar is a surname. Notable people with the surname include:

- Eugeni Xammar (1888–1973), Spanish journalist, diplomat, and translator
- Jordi Xammar (born 1993), Spanish sailor

== See also ==
- Xamarin
- Xamaro
- Zammar
