= Harshin (woreda) =

District in Somali Region, Ethiopia

Coordinates: 9°10′N 43°40′E

Harshin (Somali: Xarshin) is a woreda in Somali Region, Ethiopia. The easternmost woreda of the Jijiga Zone, Harshin is bordered on the south by the Degehabur Zone, on the west by Kebri Beyah, and on the northeast by Somaliland. The major town in Harshin is Harshin.

The Ethiopian De-mining Office reported in November 2008 that it had cleared land mines planted in Harshin as part of the four million square meters of land the office had cleared in the Somali Region.harshin was founded by a man called Maxamed Fidaar.Siciid aka Maxamad Dhol. His descendants still much of the land and have maintained a strong connection to the town.

== Demographics ==
Based on the 2007 Census conducted by the Central Statistical Agency of Ethiopia (CSA), this woreda has a total population of 80,244, of whom 43,869 are men and 36,375 women. While 8,226 or 10.25% are urban inhabitants, a further 39,275 or 48.95% are pastoralists. 99.39% of the population said they were Muslim. This woreda is primarily inhabited by the Habar Awal and Arap subclans of the Isaaq.

The 1994 national census reported a total population for this woreda of 66,488, of whom 35,145 were men and 31,343 were women; 6,409 or 9.64% were urban inhabitants. The largest ethnic group reported in Harshin was the Somali people (99.89%).
