= Hussein Mohamed Jiciir =

Somali politician

Hussein Mohamoud Jiciir

Mayor of Hargeisa
- In office February 2003 – 23 December 2012
- Preceded by: Ahmed Mahamed Mahamud
- Succeeded by: Yusuf Warsame Saeed

Hussein Mohamoud Ahmed (Somali: Xuseen Muxumed Axmed), as known as Jiciir, is a Somali politician and is the former Mayor of Hargeisa from 2003 to 2012 and holds the title of the longest-serving mayor of Hargeisa for roughly 10 years and one of the longest-serving mayors in Somaliland as a whole. He hails from the Eidagale Reer-Iidle sub-division of the Garhajis Isaaq clan.

== Mayor of Hargeisa ==
In December 2002, the municipal elections were held, and the 25 members of the Hargeisa Parliament were elected. Jiciir was one of the 11 UDUB Party lawmakers. Jiciir was elected mayor in a vote held shortly afterward, so it is sometimes said that he had been mayor since this time.

In February 2003, the Hargeisa Parliament elected a mayor and deputy mayor by mutual vote, and Jiciir became the first mayor elected by vote. Of the 25 council members, 24 were present, and Jiciir received 20 votes. Jiciir stated that his priorities would be roads, waste management, water supply, and markets.

In August 2003, Jiciir and members of the Hargeisa Parliament attended a meeting of the House of Elders (Gurti) and reported on land issues, obstacles to their work, and future plans. Jiciir and the others complained that a lack of cooperation with government agencies, such as the police and the courts, was paralyzing services to citizens and hindering their operations. They also pointed out that the lack of enforcement power and authority on the part of the local government was the cause of the unresolved land issues.

In March 2004, the Hargeisa Parliament held a vote of no confidence against Jiciir about his abuse of power. The vote resulted in 13 votes in favor of his remaining in office and 12 votes for his resignation, and he was confirmed to remain in office by a margin of one vote.

In November 2006, Jiciir was criticized for making it extremely difficult to meet with the mayor and deputy mayor. However, Jiciir explained that he had set aside Sundays and Wednesdays from 8:00 a.m. to noon each week as days for meeting with citizens. He also explained that city hall operations proceed in stages and that it is not always necessary to meet directly with the mayor personally every time to resolve an issue.

In December 2010, reports surfaced alleging that Jiciir had embezzled $65,000 from funds collected from butchers at a slaughterhouse in the capital, but he denied the allegations.

In December 2010, Jiciir was reported to have blocked the arrest of an employee convicted of corruption in the Gabiley District.

In November 2011, Deputy Mayor Hargeisa switched his party affiliation from UCID to Waddani. Since the deputy mayor is elected by the Parliament , UCID demanded that the Election Commission and the Waddani Party return the deputy mayor's seat to UCID. The Election Commission asked Mayor Jiciir to clarify the legal basis for the deputy mayor's continued tenure. Meanwhile, the leader of the Waddani Party argued that the Parliament is an organization independent of political parties and that council members do not lose their seats even if they change their party affiliation.

In September 2012, Jiciir announced that he would not seek re-election in the upcoming local council elections and would step down. At that time, regarding reports that he had switched his party affiliation from UDUB to Waddani, he explained that he had not yet officially announced his membership in Waddani, nor had he decided to leave UDUB.

In October 2012, Jiciir criticized President Silanyo for halting the commercial space construction project underway at Gobonimo Market. Although he had temporarily suspended the work out of respect for the president, he expressed his intention to meet with the president directly to discuss the matter.

On 23 December 2012, 15 members of the Hargeisa Parliament held a meeting at the local government building and elected a mayor and deputy mayor. Yusuf Warsame Siciid was elected mayor. Ten of the 25 council members were absent. However, the absent lawmakers later held a press conference and criticized the government, claiming that it had conducted the election in secret. They did, however, state that they would cooperate with the new mayor.

Jiciir is said to have achieved relatively stable city administration during his tenure., and although several major roads were built during his administration, he struggled to keep up with the city’s rapid growth.

== After that ==
After stepping down as mayor of Hargeisa, Jiciir became director of the Decentralization Bureau at the Office of the President.

In June 2013, Jiciir spoke at the groundbreaking ceremony for the roads around Hargeisa as former mayor and praised the current administration’s efforts.

In May 2020, it was reported that Maandeeq, the company contracted to manage hygiene at the livestock slaughterhouse in Hargeisa, had been engaging in fraudulent practices—including falsifying the number of animals processed—for 16 years, and that Jiciir was one of its shareholders.

In January 2023, Jiciir participated the United Nations Joint Programme on Local Governance (JPLG).
