= Harshin =

Town and capital of Harshin woreda in Somali Region, Ethiopia

Harshin ሀርሺን
- Location within Ethiopia
- Coordinates: 9°13′0″N 43°35′16″E
- Country: Ethiopia
- Region: Somali
- Zone: Fafan
- Districts: Harshin
- Elevation: 807 m (2,648 ft)

Population (2022)
  - Total: 117,187
- Time zone: UTC+3 (EAT)

Harshin (Amharic: ሀርሺን; (Somali: Xarshin) is a town and the capital of the Harshin woreda, in the Somali Region of Ethiopia, near the border with Somaliland.

== Notable people ==
- Eid Daahir Farah - Former president of Somali Region. He was Born in Harshin.

== Demographics ==
Based on the 2007 Census conducted by the Central Statistical Agency of Ethiopia (CSA), the town had a population of 8,226, with the wider woreda having a total population of 80,244, of whom 43,869 are men and 36,375 women. While 8,226 or 10.25% are urban inhabitants, a further 39,275 or 48.95% are pastoralists. 99.39% of the population said they were Muslim. This woreda is primarily inhabited by the Reer Samatar branch of the Hussein Abokar, Sacad Muse sub-clan of the Habr Awal.

The 1994 national census reported a total population for this woreda of 66,488, of whom 35,145 were men and 31,343 were women; 6,409 or 9.64% were urban inhabitants. The largest ethnic group reported in Harshin was the Somali people (99.89%).
