= Shilavo (woreda) =

Administrative subdivision of Ethiopia

Coordinates: 6°00′N 45°10′E

Shilavo (Somali: Shilaabo) is one of the woredas in the Somali Region of Ethiopia. Part of the Korahe Zone Shilavo is bordered on the southwest by the Gode Zone, on the west by Debeweyin, on the northwest by Kebri Dahar, on the northeast by the Werder Zone, and on the southeast by Somalia. The major settlement in Shilavo is Shilavo.

== Demographics ==
Based on the 2007 Census conducted by the Central Statistical Agency of Ethiopia (CSA), this woreda has a total population of 107,590, of whom 67,376 are men and 34,214 women. While 4,924 or 8.55% are urban inhabitants, a further 36,969 or 64.19% are pastoralists. 98.8% of the population said they were Muslim.

The 1997 national census reported a total population for this woreda of 43,356, of whom 23,954 were men and 19,402 were women; 4,853 or 11.19% of its population were urban dwellers. The largest ethnic group reported in Shilavo was the Somali (99.87%).
