= Mayor of Hargeisa =

Head of the government of Hargeisa

- Hargeisa Local Government Logo

- Flag of Hargeisa

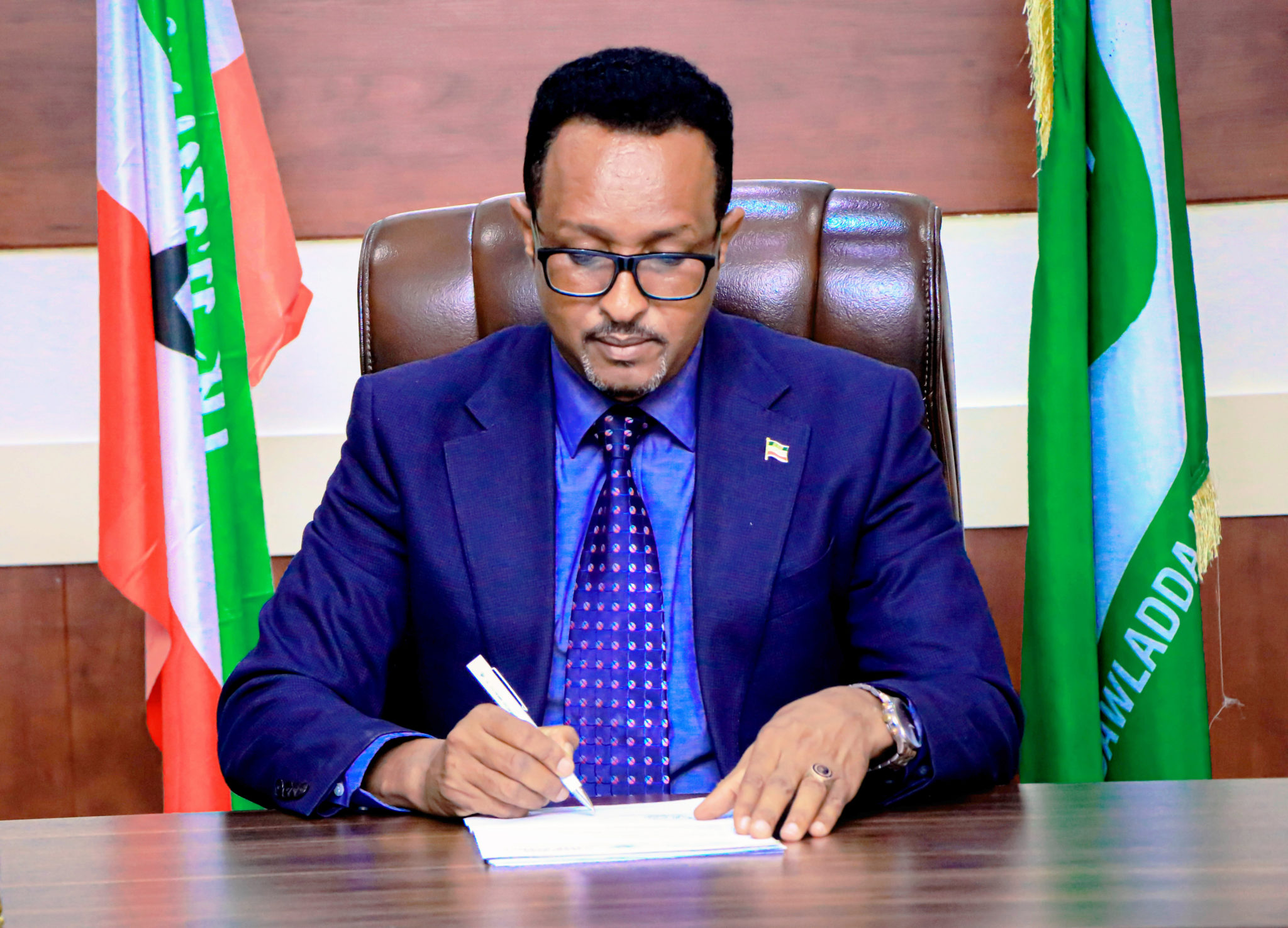
- Incumbent; Abdikarim Ahmed Mooge since 17 June 2021
- Style: Mr Mayor (formally)
- Member of: Hargeisa Municipal Council
- Seat: Hargesia City Hall
- Appointer: Hargeisa Municipal Council

The Mayor of Hargeisa is the chief executive of the city of Hargeisa, the capital and largest city of Somaliland. The current mayor is Abdikarim Ahmed Mooge, who took office on 17 June 2021.

== List of mayors ==
Portrait	Name	Somali name	Term of office		
Portrait	Name	Somali name	Took office	Left office	Time in office
	Barre Nouh (langadhe)	Barre Nuux Cabdillahi (Laangadhe)	1991	1992	
	Omar Bobe Muse		1992	1993	
	Mohamed Hashi Elmi	Maxamed Xaashi Cilmi	1993	1996	
	Muse Mohamed Yusuf		1996	1997	
	Ahmed Mahamed Mahamud "Ahmed-dheere"	Axmed Maxamed Maxamuud "Axmed-dheere"		February 2003	
	Hussein Mohamed Jiciir		February 2003	23 December 2012	
	Yusuf Warsame Saeed	Yuusuf Warsame Saciid	23 December 2012	7 April 2013	105 days
	Abdurrahman Mahmoud Aidiid	Cabdiraxman Maxmuud Caydiid	14 April 2013	17 June 2021	8 years, 64 days
	Abdikarim Ahmed Mooge	Cabdikariin Axmed Mooge Liibaan	17 June 2021	30 May 2026	5 years, 144 days
	Abdirisaq Mohamed Farah	Cabdirisaaq Maxamed Faarax	30 May 2026		

== See also ==
- Mayor of Berbera
- Mayor of Las Anod
- Mayor of Burao
- Mayor of Erigavo
- Mayor of Borama
