= Ibrahim Kodbuur District =

Ibrahim Kodbuur District Degmada Ibraahim Koodbuur
- District
- Country: Somaliland
- City: Hargeisa
- Time zone: UTC+3 (EAT)

Ibrahim Kodbuur District (Somali: Degmada Ibraahim Koodbuur) is a district in Hargeisa, Somaliland. It is one of the eight administrative districts of Hargeisa City. Ibrahim Kodbuur was a senior commander of the Somali National Movement and led a rescue operation to free another senior member from police custody in the 1980s.
