= Degehamedo (woreda) =

District in the Somali Region of Ethiopia

Coordinates: 8°15′N 43°00′E

Degehmadow (Somali: Dhagaxmadow) is one of the woreda:Districts in the Somali Region of Ethiopia. Part of the Degehabur Zone, Degehamedo is bordered on the south and northwest by the Fiq Zone, and on the east by Degehabur. The major town of the woreda is Degehmadow.

The only perennial river in Degehamedo is the Fafen.

== Demographics ==
Based on the 2007 Census conducted by the Central Statistical Agency of Ethiopia (CSA), this woreda has a total population of 58,487, of whom 34,199 are men and 24,288 women. While 1,265 or 2.16% are urban inhabitants, a further 46,213 or 79.01% are pastoralists. 97.66% of the population said they were Muslim. This woreda is primarily inhabited by the Ogaden ugas Samatar “maalinguur” The 1994 national census reported a total population for this woreda of 35,977, of whom 21,047 were men and 14,930 were women; 1,409 or 3.92% were urban inhabitants. The largest ethnic group reported in Degehamedo was the Somali people (99.98%).
