= Mohamoud Dirir Gheddi =

Ethiopian politician (born 1959)

- Born: 24 September 1959 (age 67); Dire Dawa, Ethiopia
- Occupations: Teacher, Diplomat
- Political party: Somali Democratic Party

Academic background
- Education: Damascus University (BA)

Mohamoud Dirir Gheddi is an Ethiopian politician. He was chairman of the Somali Democratic Party and served as the Minister of Mining under the Meles Zenawi administration.

== Early life ==
Mohamoud was born in Dire Dawa in 1959. In 1976 he obtained a Bachelor of Arts degree in English from Damascus University and subsequently joined the rebel group; Western Somali Liberation Front in the same year. For three years beginning in 1983 he taught in Hargeisa, Somalia.

== Career ==
In 1993 Mohamoud would become president of the Issa and Gurgura Liberation Front. He would later serve as chairman of the Somali Democratic Party (SDP) and in 1995 was elected MP for the SDP to the House of Peoples' Representatives.

Mohamoud also served as Ethiopian ambassador to Egypt.

== Personal life ==
He hails from the Somali Issa clan. Mohamoud is a polyglot who can speak six languages; Somali, Amharic, Oromo, Harari, English, and Arabic. His hobbies include: writing and painting.
