= Mula, Ethiopia =

Mula
- District
- Location within Ethiopia
- Country: Ethiopia

Mula is a district of Somali Region in Ethiopia.

== See also ==
- Districts of Ethiopia
