= Ethiopian Somali Democratic League =

Former political party in Ethiopia (1994–1998)

Somali Democratic League
- Founded: 1994
- Dissolved: 1998
- Merger of: IGLF
- Merged into: SDP
- Ideology: Somali nationalism Ethnic nationalism
- National affiliation: EPRDF
- Somali State Council: 76 / 139 (1995)

The Somali Democratic League (ESDL) was a political party in the Somali Region of Ethiopia. It was the ruling EPRDF's regional partner from 1994 to 1998.

== Overview ==
The ESDL was formed in 1994 through the merger of ten clan-based political parties from the region, including the Issa and Gurgura Liberation Front, at a meeting in Hurso. In the subsequent 1995 elections, the ESDL won a landslide victory in the 1995 elections by securing 76 of 139 seats in the regional parliament, and 15 of the 23 seats in the federal parliament allotted to the Somali Region.

Despite receiving the support of the EPRDF, and initially from the non-Ogaden clans of Somali Isaaq, Issa and Gadabursi, the ESDL failed to provide effective administration because of a number of interrelated reasons. One was insurmountable internal divisions and a lack of party discipline; this prevented regular meetings of not only the different organs of the party, but even the regional parliament. Asnake Kefale Adegehe reports he learned from sources in Jijiga that Eid Daahir Farah, the Regional president, avoided convening regular sessions of the regional parliament out of fear that, were the parliament allowed to meet, that body would have sacked him and his cabinet.

The ESDL finally collapsed in October 1997 when the regional executive committee attempted to remove Regional President Id Tahir from office. The Ethiopian federal government declared this act was a coup, and demanded Id Tahir be reinstalled. Although the regional parliament was not consulted about the sacking of the president it refused to accept the pressure of the federal government, and instead sacked both the president and the entire executive committee, and elected a new president, Mohammed Ma'alin Ali, from the Ogaden National Liberation Front (ONLF). The party's disorder led federal authorities to order the remnants of the ESDL to merge with moderate members of the ONLF. In June 1998, both groups elected 35 members to represent them at the founding convention of the new Somali People's Democratic Party.
