= Daroor (woreda) =

Daroor Degmada Daroor
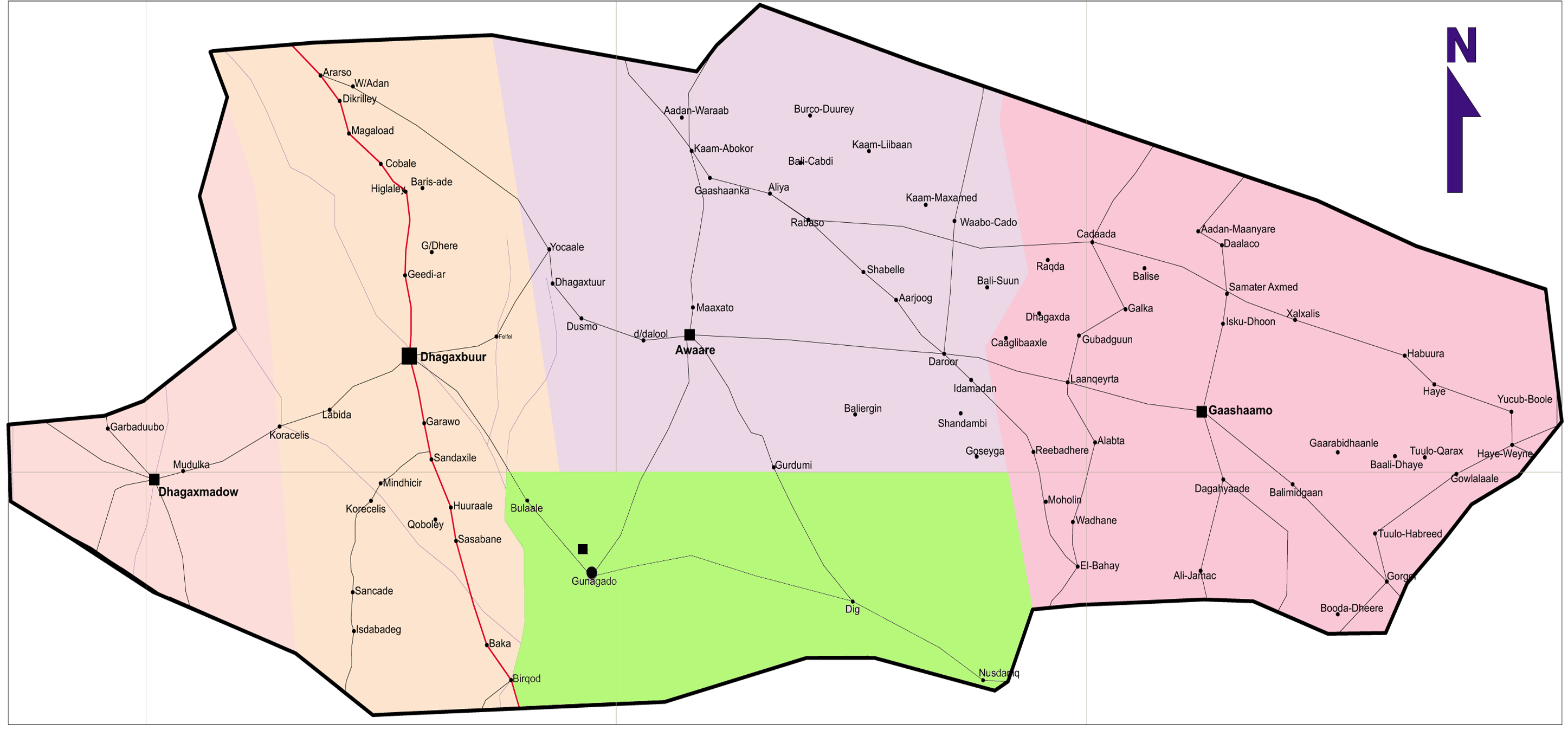
- Map of Jarar Zone

- Location within Ethiopia
- Coordinates: 8°13′24″N 44°41′41″E
- Country: Ethiopia
- Region: Somali
- Zone: Jarar zone
- Districts: Daroor
- Elevation: 943 m (3,094 ft)
- Time zone: UTC+3 (EAT)

Daroor (Somali: Daroor, also spelled Darror, Daror, and Darar, Ge'ez ዳሮር) is a town in the Daror woreda, in the Somali Region of Ethiopia. It is frequently considered part of the Haud. It is approximately 30 km south of the border with Somaliland.

== History ==
In 2020 Daroor had 334,016 inhabitants, according to the Ethiopian Central Statistical Agency. In 1997 of 39,397 inhabitants 99,47% of these were Somali, and 50 residents were from other ethnic groups. In 1988 a refugee camp was set up for Somalis. The refugee camp housed predominantly members of the Guyobe and Abdirahman Muse a, a sub-sub clan of Eidagale clan of the Isaaq clan. The camp's population fell from around 32000 to 12000 in September 1994. After renewed fighting in November, the population rose to 49.000. At the end of 2001 / the beginning of 2002 the camp was closed after most refugees voluntarily went home.

The economy of the area was strongly affected when the Saudi Arabian 1998 import of cattle from northeast Africa stopped.
