= Yaxoob =

- District
- Country: Ethiopia

Yaxoob Somali pronunciation: [jaħoːb], is a district of Somali Region in Ethiopia.

== See also ==
- Districts of Ethiopia
