= Abdurrahman Mahmoud Aidiid =

Somali politician

Abdurrahman Mahmoud Aidiid عبد الرحمن محمود عيديد
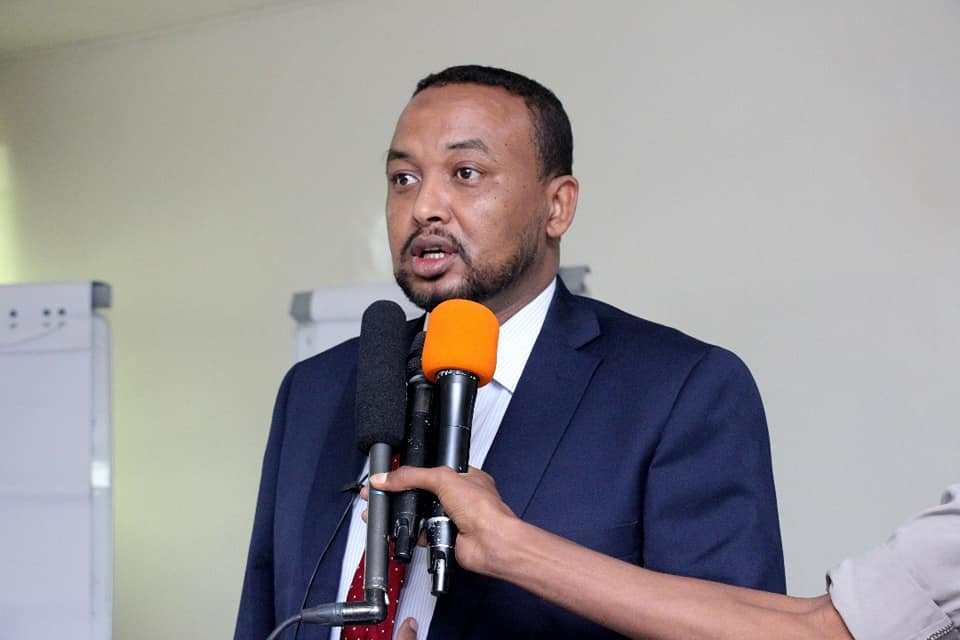

Mayor of Hargeisa
- In office 14 April 2013 – 17 June 2021
- Preceded by: Yusuf Warsame Saeed
- Succeeded by: Abdikarim Ahmed Mooge

Personal details
- Party: Kulmiye

Abdurrahman Mahmoud Aidiid (Soltelco) (Somali: Cabdiraxman Maxmuud Caydiid, Arabic: عبد الرحمن محمود عيديد) is a Somalilander politician. He is a former Mayor of Hargeisa, the largest city and capital of Somaliland from 2013 to 2021. He belongs to the Sa'ad Musa sub-division of the Habr Awal Isaaq clan.

== Career ==
Aidiid is a member of the Peace, Unity, and Development Party (Kulmiye), the ruling political party in Somaliland. After the death of Hargeisa Mayor Yusuf Warsame Saeed, Aidiid was elected as replacement leader on April 14, 2013, by a quorum of 24 municipal councilors. He is the youngest official ever to be appointed to the position. He was succeeded as the mayor of Hargeisa after the 2021 Somaliland municipal elections, gaining the most votes out of all candidates in Hargeisa.
