= Boodaley (woreda) =

- District
- Country: Ethiopia

Boodaley is a district of Somali Region in Ethiopia.

== See also ==
- Districts of Ethiopia
