= Hora-shagax =

- District
- Country: Ethiopia

Hora-shagax is a district of Somali Region in Ethiopia.

== See also ==
- Districts of Ethiopia
