= Abdullahi Lugbuur =

Ethiopian politician

Abdullahi Lugbuur was the ninth president of the Somali Region of Ethiopia. He took office in October 2005 and left office in November 2008. He was the longest-serving president of the regional state in the first two decades of its creation.
