= Ceel-Ogadeen =

El-Ogadeen
- District
- Nickname: ceelogaden
- Country: Ethiopia

Population
  - Total: 180,000

Ceel-Ogadeen is a district of Somali Region in Ethiopia.

== See also ==
- Districts of Ogadenia
