= Higloley (woreda) =

- District
- Country: Ethiopia

Higloley is a district of Somali Region in Ethiopia.

== See also ==
- Districts of Ethiopia
