= Laas-dhankayre =

- District
- Country: Ethiopia

Laas-dhankayre is a district of Somali Region in Ethiopia.
