= Aware (woreda) =

District in Somali Region, Ethiopia

Coordinates: 8°35′N 44°00′E

Aware (Somali: Awaare) is one of the woredas of Ethiopia in the Somali Region. Part of the Jarar Zone, formerly Degehabur Zone, Aware is bordered on the south by Gunagado, on the west by Degehabur, on the north by the Jijiga Zone, on the northeast by Somaliland, and on the east by Misraq Gashamo. Gunagado, Daroor, Yoocaale, and Gashamo woredas were all separated from Aware between 1995 and 2015. The capital of the woreda is Aware.

== Overview ==
Situated near the border with Somaliland, Aware is one of the oldest cities in the Ogaden, with history spanning over centuries. Prior to the 1977 Ogaden War ('77 War) between Ethiopia and Somalia, the city served as the principal seat of the Jarar Zone. At the onset of the '77 war, the provincial capital of the zone was moved more inland to Degehabur, which by the early 70's surpassed Aware both in population and in economic importance. The city was the seat of the British administration in the Haud prior to Somali independence in 1960. Aware has dry pasturage. However, the construction of private wells and birkas (underground concrete water tanks), a development which started in the 1950s and later on dramatically increased after the 1970s, offered a solution to the absence of permanent water. While this encouraged birka owners to further diversify traditional animal husbandry beyond camels and small ruminants into water-dependent cattle, this also increased livestock population in an overpopulated region, putting additional pressure on shrinking resource base; the vicinity of almost every settlement in Aware have become overgrazed by cattle belonging to the villagers, thus driving away ideal nomads raising camels and small ruminants in the eternal search for pasture and water.

As part of their response to the local insurgency, the Ethiopian army enforced a trade embargo on part of the Somali Region which includes Aware. In early June 2007, a truck transporting goods (sugar, oil, and other food items) from Hargeysa was stopped by a military patrol 12 kilometers from Aware town, near the village of Dud Adaad. The patrol accused the truck's owner of delivering food to the Ogaden National Liberation Front, and confiscated his truck. In mid-September of the same year, three more commercial trucks traveling from Hargeysa to Aware were stopped and confiscated by the army at Bukudhaba village.

== Demographics ==
Because of its high population and the large territory encompassed, Aware Woreda surpasses the threshold needed to be upgraded to a Zone status. This conversion to the Zone status is widely expected and will most certainly happen within the next regional parliamentary sessions in 2018/2019. The redistricting will see Aware split from Degehabur Zone. The 2007 Census conducted by the Central Statistical Agency of Ethiopia (CSA) was deemed unsatisfactory due to ongoing war between the ONLF and Ethiopian defense forces with Aware at its epicenter. The 1997 national census reported a total population for this woreda of 103,337, of whom 55,839 were men and 47,498 were women; 22,518 or 21.79% of its population were urban dwellers. The largest ethnic group reported in Aware was the Somali. The woreda is inhabited by the Eidagale and others of the subclan of the Isaaq clan family.
