= Abdikarim Ahmed Mooge =

Somali politician

- Cabdikariin Axmed Mooge
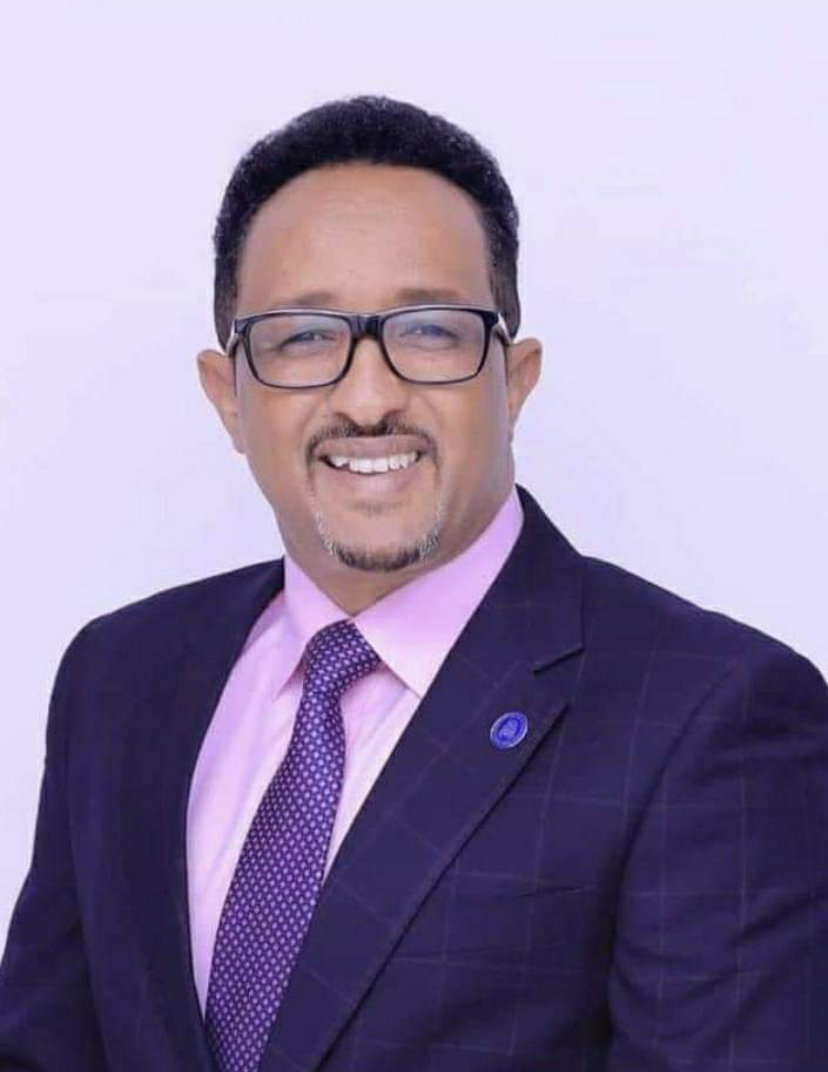

Mayor of Hargeisa
- In office 17 June 2021 – 30 May 2026
- Deputy: Khadar Ahmed Omar
- Preceded by: Abdurrahman Mahmoud Aidiid (Soltelco)
- Succeeded by: Abdurrazak Mohamed Farah (Wiiwaa)

Member of Hargeisa City Council
- In office 31 May 2021 – 31 May 2026

Personal details
- Born: 1974 (age 51–52) Sin-ujiif, Somalia

Abdikarim Ahmed Mooge Liibaan (Somali: Cabdikariin Axmed Mooge Liibaan) is a Somaliland politician and is the former Mayor of Hargeisa, the largest city and capital of Somaliland.

== Early life ==
Abdikarim was born in 1974 in Sin-ujiif, a village in the outskirts of Garowe, Somalia. Abdikarim is the son of famous Somali artist Ahmed Mooge Liibaan and nephew of famous Somali artist Mohamed Mooge Liibaan. He grew up in Hargeisa, where he completed his primary and secondary education. At the outbreak of clashes in Hargeisa during the Somaliland War of Independence, Abdikarim fled to Ethiopia, specifically the Kaam-Abokor refugee camp.

Upon his return to Somaliland, he and several other youth founded the HAVAYOCO agency, with the goal of supporting vulnerable people and youth. He later worked for UN agencies and international organizations, where he moved abroad and spent some of his life, but later returned to Hargeisa.

== Political career ==
During the Silanyo administration, Abdikarim served in two positions; as the Deputy Minister of National Planning and as the Deputy Minister of Fisheries, but he later resigned.

Abdikarim took part politically in his campaign of the Waddani party, the largest opposition party in Somaliland, where he succeeded the previous mayor, Abdurrahman Mahmoud Aidiid, as the mayor of Hargeisa after the 2021 Somaliland municipal elections, gaining the most votes out of all candidates in Hargeisa.
