= Yusuf Warsame Saeed =

Yusuf Warsame Saeed يوسف ارسام سعيد
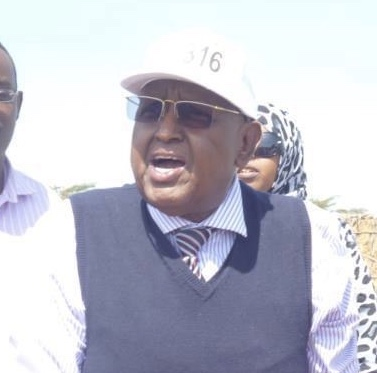

Mayor of Hargeisa
- In office 23 December 2012 – 7 April 2013
- President: Ahmed Mohamed Mohamoud
- Preceded by: Hussein Mohamoud Jiciir
- Succeeded by: Abdurrahman Mahmoud Aidiid

Personal details
- Born: Hargeisa, British Somaliland (now Somaliland)
- Died: April 7, 2013 Dubai, UAE
- Party: Kulmiye
- Education: University of London (BA)

Yusuf Warsame Saeed (Somali: Yuusuf Warsame Saciid; Arabic: يوسف ارسام سعيد; died 7 April 2013) was a Somali politician. He was the Mayor of Hargeisa, the capital of the Republic of Somaliland. An engineer by profession, Saeed was elected to the position on December 23, 2012. He served in this capacity until a few months prior to his death, which followed several months of hospitalization in Dubai.
