= Xamaro =

- District
- Country: Ethiopia

Xamaro is a district of Somali Region in Ethiopia.

== See also ==
- Districts of Ethiopia
