= Issa and Gurgura Liberation Front =

The Issa and Gurgura Liberation Front (IGLF; Somali: Jabhadda Xoreynta Ciise iyo Gurgura) was a political faction in eastern Ethiopia, led by Riyaale Ahmed. It was formed in 1991.

== History ==
The IGLF, which is based amongst the Issa and Gurgura clans in northern Hararghe, evolved out of the Iil Tire division of the Western Somali Liberation Front. During its initial period of existence, its armed members clashed many times with the Somali National Movement along the Ethiopia-Somalia border.

Around 1992 IGLF was involved in clashes with the dominant Ethiopian People's Revolutionary Democratic Front (EPRDF). During this period IGLF sabotaged the Addis Ababa–Djibouti Railway.

In 1993 its president was Mohamoud Dirir Gheddi.
