= Bir-qod =

Birqod
- District
- Country: Ethiopia

Birqod or Bir-qod is a district of Somali Region in Ethiopia.

== See also ==
- Districts of Ethiopia
