= Ahmed Mooge Liibaan =

Somali musician (1943–1997)

- Born: Axmed Mooge Liibaan; 1943
- Origin: Hargeisa, Somaliland
- Died: October 1997 (aged 53–54) Nairobi, Kenya
- Genres: Somali music
- Occupations: Musician and Activist
- Instruments: Oud, vocals
- Years active: 1960s–1997

Ahmed Mooge Liibaan (Somali: Axmed Mooge Liibaan) (1943–1997) was a prominent Somali musician and singer. He was the brother of Mohamed Mooge Liibaan, another prominent Somali artist, and is also the father of the current mayor of Hargeisa city, Abdikarim Ahmed Mooge.

== See also ==
- Abdikarim Ahmed Mooge
