= Jarar Zone =

Zone in the Somali Region of Ethiopia

Jarar Zone Gobolka Jarar
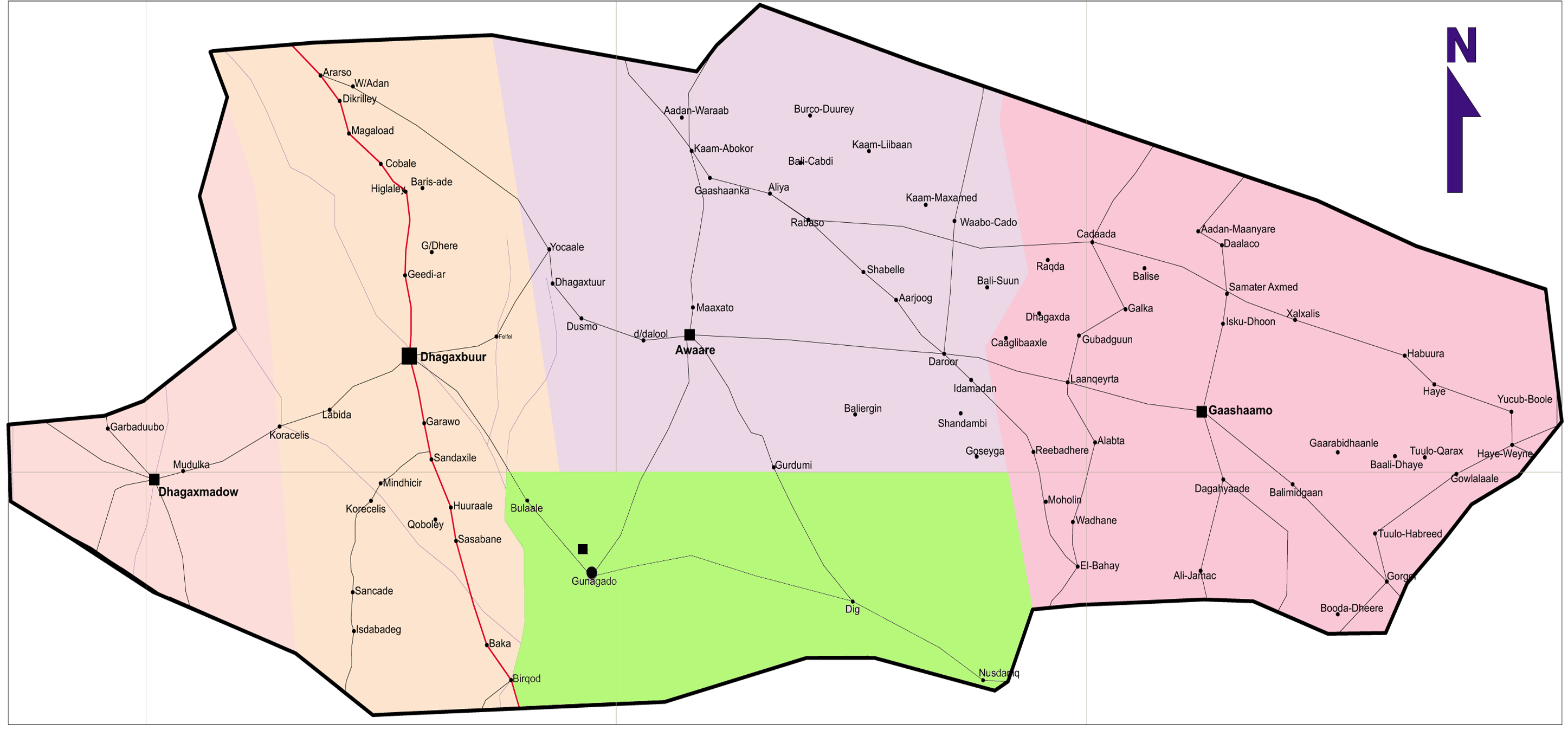
- Map of Jarar Zone

- Location within Ethiopia
- Coordinates: 8°15′N 43°45′E
- Country: Ethiopia
- Region: Somali
- Zone: Jarar Zone

Government
  - Type: State Presidential
  - Governor: Ahmed Hussein(bidhic)

Area
  - Total: 61,130 km^{2} (23,601 sq mi)

Population (2017)
  - Total: 2,326,168
- Time zone: UTC+3 (EAT)
  - Summer (DST): UTC+3
- Postal code: 3040
- Area code: +251

Jarar (Somali: Jarar) is a zone in Somali Region of Ethiopia. It was previously known as the Degehabur zone, so named after its largest city, Degehabur. Jarar Zone is bordered on the south by Korahe, on the southwest by Nogob, on the northwest by Fafan Zone, on the southeast by Dollo, and on the northeast by Somaliland.

== Demographics ==
Based on the 2007 Census conducted by the Central Statistical Agency of Ethiopia (CSA), this Zone has a total population of 478,168, of whom 268,006 are men and 210,162 women. While 62,584 or 13.01% are urban inhabitants, a further 223,778 or 46.8% were pastoralists. The largest ethnic group reported in Jarar were the Somalis (98.92%); all other ethnic groups made up 1.08% of the population. Somali language is spoken as a first language by 99.62%; the remaining 0.38% spoke all other primary languages reported. 98.72% of the population said they were Muslim.

Map of the regions and zones of Ethiopia

The 1997 national census reported a total population for this Zone of 304,907 in 72,010 households, of whom 168,211 were men and 136,696 were women; 57,866 or 18.98% of its population were urban dwellers. The largest ethnic group reported in Jarar was the Somalis (99.55%); a similar proportion spoke Somali (99.58%). Only 13,514 or 4.43% were literate.

According to a May 24, 2004 World Bank memorandum, 1% of the inhabitants of Jarar have access to electricity, this zone has a road density of 10.3 kilometers per 1000 square kilometers, the average rural household has 1.5 hectare of land (compared to the national average of 1.01 hectare of land and an average of 2.25 for pastoral Regions) and the equivalent of 1.5 heads of livestock. 28.2% of the population is in non-farm related jobs, compared to the national average of 25% and an average of 28% for pastoral Regions. 23% of all eligible children are enrolled in primary school, and 3% in secondary schools. 100% of the zone is exposed to malaria, and none to Tsetse fly. The memorandum gave this zone a drought risk rating of 614. In 2006, the Jarar zone was affected by deforestation due to charcoal production.

== Districts ==
Jarar Zone is subdivided into Tenth Districts and One Special Zone

- Degehabur Special Zone
- Daroor
- Gaashaamo
- Awaare
- Araarso
- Yoocaale
- Dhagaxmadow
- Gunagado
- Birqod
- Dig
- Bilcil buur

== Agriculture ==
On 5–23 November 2003, the CSA conducted the first ever national agricultural census, of which the livestock census was an important component. For the Somali Region, the CSA generated estimated figures for the livestock population (cattle, sheep, goats, camels, and equids) and their distribution by commissioning an aerial survey. For the Jarar Zone, their results included:

| Animal | Estimated total | number per sqk. |
|---|---|---|
| cattle | 51,536 | 1.4 |
| sheep | 1,395,779 | 56.6 (including goats) |
| goats | 721,925 | 56.6 (including sheep) |
| camels | 131,106 | 3.5 |
| asses | 5,415 | 0.1 (all equids) |
| mules | 68 | 0.1 (all equids) |
| horses | 19 | 0.1 (all equids) |
