= Somali Democratic Party =

Former political party in Ethiopia (1993–2019)

Somali Democratic Party Xisbiga Dimuqraadiga Soomaalida
- Leader: Ahmed Shide
- Founded: 1998
- Dissolved: 1 December 2019
- Merger of: ESDL; ONLF (factions)
- Merged into: Prosperity Party
- Headquarters: Jijiga
- Ideology: Somali interests
- Political position: Centre-left
- National affiliation: EPRDF
- Colors: Sky blue

Website
- www.spdp.org.et

The Somali Democratic Party (SDP; Somali: Xisbiga Dimuqraadiga Soomaalida), formerly the Ethiopian Somali People's Democratic Party (ESPDP; Somali: Xisbiga Dimuqraadiga Shacabka Soomalida Itoobiya) until April 2019, was a political party in Ethiopia, created by the ruling Ethiopian People's Revolutionary Democratic Front (EPRDF) after refusing Somali demands for self-determination in 1998. The EPRDF previously created a surrogate party called the Ethiopian Somali Democratic League which was one of many satellite organisations existing throughout Ethiopia. The organisation was led by Ahmed Shide.

== History ==
Like the ESDL before it, the Somali Democratic Party was considered by many inhabitants of the Somali Region to be an "EPRDF puppet", who accused its members "of brutal repression and systematic massacres in ensuring the region stays under firm control". In the early 2000s its chairman was Mohamoud Dirir Gheddi.

The party observed its eleventh anniversary of its founding in Filtu, where numerous improvements to the infrastructure of the Liben Zone were announced.

In December 2019, the party merged with the Afar National Democratic Party (ANDP), the Amhara Democratic Party (ADP), the Benishangul-Gumuz People's Democratic Unity Front (BGPDUF), the Gambela People's Democratic Movement (GPDM), the Hareri National League (HNL), the Oromo Democratic Party (ODP) and the Southern Ethiopian People's Democratic Movement (SEPDM) to form the new Prosperity Party.
