= Yoocaale =

- District
- Country: Ethiopia

Yoocaale (English: yoale) is one of the jarar province districts, Yoocaale is located north-east of dhagahbour province west of Aware Yoocaale is one of the Somali Region Districts in Ethiopia., population of yoale 96,000, live style of yoale depend on pastoral and agrpostoral also have 18 kabales (sub city), in side of water, it have two well one had constructed in deya (rig) away from district to North West onether constructed to east, inside the town people drinks clean water 100% but there is traditionally water called birka (pond) is holl diged people in ancient times to store more than 200 birka had constructed, in side of trousim at time of raining season yoale have attracted small rift green

== See also ==
- Districts of Ethiopia
