= Gunagado =

Gunagado Guryo Samo
- District
- Location within Ethiopia
- Country: Ethiopia

Gunagado is a district of Somali Region in Ethiopia.

Guna-Gado is a district located in eastern part of Jarar Zone in Somali regional state.

Gungado was a district since 2005.

The first person who settled was Ali Ilmi mostly known Ali Agole, 1950.

Guna-Gado is base clan of Reer Haruun.

== See also ==
- Districts of Ethiopia
