= Erer Zone =

Erer
- Zone
- Country: Ethiopia

Erer is a zone of Somali Region in Ethiopia.

== See also ==
- List of zones of Ethiopia
