= Korahe Zone =

Zone in the Somali Region of Ethiopia

Korahe Zone Gobolka Qoraxeey
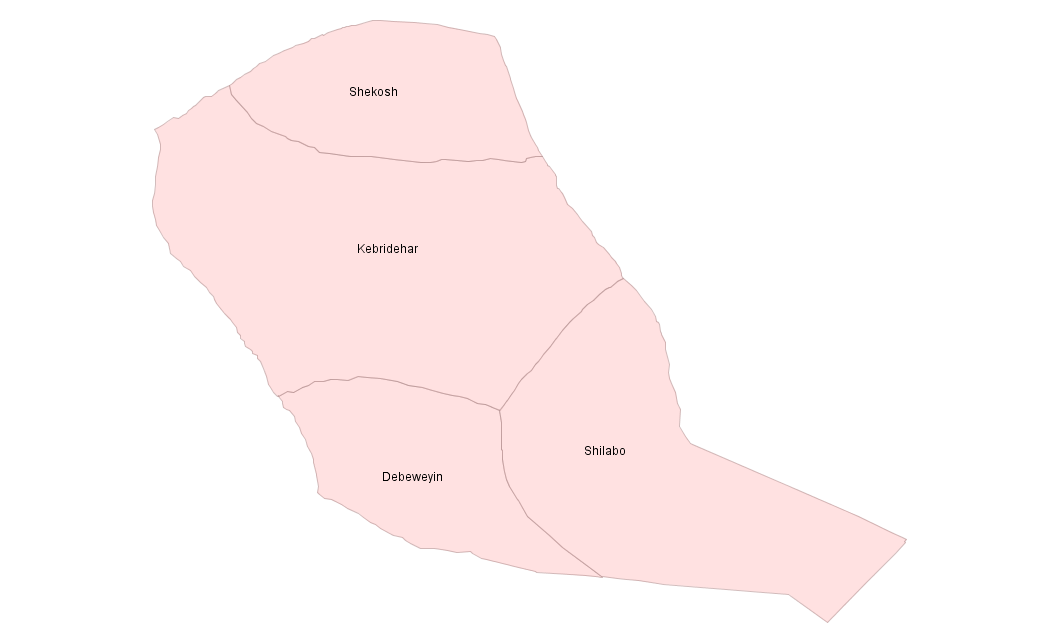
- Map of Korahe Zone
- Motto: Qorexey Gaas Ku caan
- Interactive map of Korahe Zone
- Coordinates: 6°45′N 44°30′E
- Country: Ethiopia
- Region: Somali
- Zone: Korahe

Government
  - Governor: shaafi muhumed abdi
  - Deputy governor: mustafe mahdi badal

Population (2007)
  - Total: 689,534
- Time zone: UTC+3 (EAT)

Korahe (Somali: Qoraxeey) is one of eleven Zones of the Somali Region of Ethiopia. Korahe is bordered on the southwest by the Shabeele Zone, on the northwest by Erer Zone, on the north by Jarar Zone, on the east by Doolo Zone, and on the southeast by Somalia's federal state of Galmudug.

== Demographics ==
Based on the 2007 Census conducted by the Central Statistical Agency of Ethiopia (CSA), this Zone has a total population of 901,028 of whom 463,211 are men and 437,817 women. While 47,607 or 20% are urban inhabitants, a further 265,106 or 80% were pastoralists. The largest ethnic group reported in Korahe were the Somalis (99.98%); all other ethnic groups made up 0.02% of the population. Somali language is spoken as a first language by 99.98%; the remaining 0.02% spoke all other primary languages reported. 98.92% of the population said they were Muslim.

The 1997 national census reported a total population for this Zone of 242,276 in 28,891 households, of whom 500,000-700,000 were men and 600,000- 700,000 were women; 37,226 or 15.37% of its population were urban dwellers. The largest ethnic group reported in Korahe was the Somali (98.75%); a similar proportion spoke Somali (99.13%) as their primary language. Only 14,256 or 5.88% were literate.

According to a May 24, 2004 World Bank memorandum, 2% of the inhabitants of Korahe have access to electricity, this zone has a road density of 6.1 kilometers per 1000 square kilometers, the average rural household has 0.7 hectare of land (compared to the national average of 1.01 hectare of land and an average of 2.25 for pastoral Regions) and the equivalent of 2.4 heads of livestock. 28.2% of the population is in non-farm related jobs, compared to the national average of 25% and an average of 28% for pastoral Regions. 18% of all eligible children are enrolled in primary school, and 4% in secondary schools. 100% of the zone is exposed to malaria, and none to Tsetse fly. The memorandum gave this zone a drought risk rating of 761.

== Agriculture ==
Map of the regions and zones of Ethiopia

On 5–23 November 2003, the CSA conducted the first ever national agricultural census, of which the livestock census was an important component. For the Somali Region, the CSA generated estimated figures for the livestock population (cattle, sheep, goats, camels, and equids) and their distribution by commissioning an aerial survey. For the Korahe Zone, their results included:

Animal	Estimated total	number per sqk.
cattle	26,301	0.8
sheep	362,778	32.7 (including goats)
goats	690,891	32.7 (including sheep)
camels	115,498	4.7
asses	2,504	0.1 (all equids)
mules	14	0.1 (all equids)
horses	0	
