= Somali Region =

Regional State in Eastern Ethiopia

Coordinates: 7°26′19″N 44°17′49″E

Somali Region: Dawladda Deegaanka Soomaalida (Somali); ሱማሌ ክልል (Amharic)
- Regional state
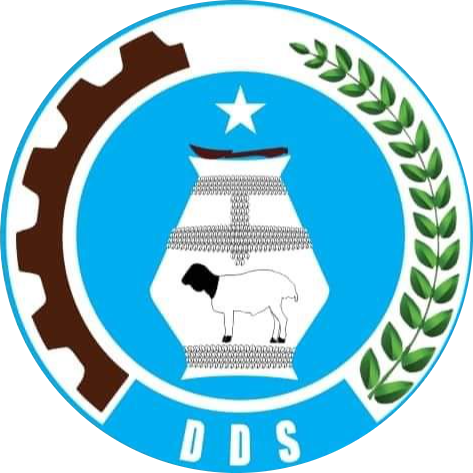
- Flag Seal
- Interactive map of Somali Region
- Country: Ethiopia
- Capital: Jijiga

Government
  - President of Somali Regional State,Federal Rep. of Ethiopia: Mustafe Mohammed Omer

Area
  - Total: 366,000 km^{2} (141,000 sq mi)
  - Land: 366,000 km^{2} (141,000 sq mi)
  - Water: 9,842 km^{2} (3,800 sq mi) 3%
  - Rank: 2nd

Population (2025)
  - Total: 12,615,000
  - Rank: 3rd
  - Density: 35.81/km^{2} (92.7/sq mi)
- Demonym: Somali
- Time zone: UTC+3 (EAT)
- Area code: +251
- ISO 3166 code: ET-SO
- HDI (2019): 0.433 low · 11th of 11

The Somali Region (Somali: Dawlad Deegaanka Soomaalida, Amharic: ሱማሌ ክልል, romanized: Sumalē Kilil, Arabic: المنطقة الصومالية), also known as Soomaali Galbeed (lit. 'Western Somalia') and officially the Somali Regional State, is a regional state in eastern Ethiopia. It is the second largest region of Ethiopia in terms of area. The state borders the Ethiopian regions of Afar and Oromia to the west, as well as Djibouti and Somaliland to the north, Somalia to the east and south; and Kenya to the southwest. Jijiga is the capital of the state.

The Somali regional government is composed of the executive branch, led by the President; the legislative branch, which comprises the State Council; and the judicial branch, which is led by the State Supreme Court.

== History ==
What is now the Somali Region was part of the conquests of Menelik II in the late 19th century.

The Somali Region formed a large part of the pre-1995 provinces of Hararghe, Bale and Sidamo. The population is predominantly Somali, and there have been attempts to incorporate the area into a Greater Somalia. In the 1977, Somalia invaded Ethiopia, igniting the Ogaden War, which Somalia lost due to timely military intervention from the Soviet Union and its ally Cuba. Despite this defeat, local groups still tried either to become part of Somalia or independent.

The 2007 Abole oil field raid, in which 72 Chinese and Ethiopian oilfield workers were killed, has led to a series of military reprisals against the rebel group ONLF Ogaden National Liberation Front.

Until its first-ever district elections in February 2004, Zonal and woreda administrators and village chairmen were appointed by the Regional government. Senior politicians at the Regional level nominated their clients to the local government positions. In the 2004 local elections, each woreda elected a council including a spokesman, vice-spokesman, administrator, and vice-administrator. These councils have the responsibility of managing budgets and development activities within their respective districts.

== Demographics ==
Based on the 2007 Census conducted by the Central Statistical Agency of Ethiopia (CSA), the Somali Region has a total population of 4,439,147, consisting of 2,468,784 men and 1,970,363 women; urban residents numbered 621,210 or 14% of the population, while rural residents numbered 3,817,937. With an estimated area of 327,068 square kilometers, this region has an estimated density of 20.9 people per square kilometer. For the entire region 1, 685,986 households were counted, which results in an average for the Region of 6.8 persons to a household, with urban households having on average 6 and rural households 6.5 people.

There are 8 refugee camps and 1 transit center, housing 212,967 refugees from Somalia, located in Somali Region.

In the previous census, conducted in 1994, the region's population was reported to be 3,383,165, of which Somalis made up 3,236,667. There were 1,846,417 were males and 1,537,748 were females. The urban residents of the Somali Region numbered 492,710 households, with an average of 6.6 persons per household; a high sex ratio of 120 males to 100 females was reported. As of 1997, the ethnic composition of the Region was 99.01% Somali, 0.30% Amhara, 0.5% Oromo; all other ethnic groups made up 0.2% of the population.

According to the CSA, as of 2004, 38.98% of the total population had access to safe drinking water, of whom 21.32% were rural inhabitants and 77.21% were urban. Values for other reported common indicators of the standard of living for Somali as of 2005 include the following: 71.8% of the inhabitants fall into the lowest wealth quintile; adult literacy for men is 22% and for women 9.8%; and the Regional infant mortality rate is 57 infant deaths per 1,000 live births, which is less than the nationwide average of 77; at least half of these deaths occurred in the infants' first month of life.

Year	Ethiopia population	Somali Region population	% of Ethiopia	Source
2007	73,918,505	4,439,147	6.0%	
2012	84,320,987	5,148,989	6.11%	
2013	86,613,986	5,527,000	6.38%	
2023	126,526,272	6,374,284	5.03%	

The region is home to almost all major Somali clan families with the majority being from the Ogaden tribe of Darod comprising 65% of the total population. Except for Liben and Sitti, the Ogaden clan have a majority presence in all other nine zones.

The Akisho clan, Issa, Gadabuursi and Jaarso subclans of the Dir primarily inhabit the northern Sitti zone, Awbare zone.

=== Languages ===
Somali as a primary language is spoken by 95.89% of the inhabitants. All other languages spoken together make up 4.11%. Girirra is a recently identified native language that may predate Northern Somali in the region, counted as a Somali dialect in earlier surveys.

=== Religion ===
99.74% of the population are Muslim, All other religions together made up 0.26%.

== Agriculture ==
The CSA of Ethiopia estimated in 2005 that farmers in the Somali Region had a total of 2,459,720 cattle (representing 15.19% of Ethiopia's total cattle), 2,463,000 sheep (27.66%), 3,650,970 goats (60.02%), 1,991,550 donkeys (42.66%), 3,165,260 camels (96.2%), 154,670 poultry of all species (0.5%), and 5,330 beehives (0.12%). For nomadic inhabitants, the CSA provided two sets of estimates, one based on aerial surveys and the other on more conventional methodology:

Livestock	Aerial survey (conducted 5-23 Nov. 2003)	Conventional survey (conducted 11 Dec. 2003)
Cattle	2,670,280	1,130,610
Sheep	8,410,800	4,250,110
Goats	8,525,460	3,177,580
Camels	3,041,870	194,510
Donkeys	142,640	124,290
Mules	1,430	160
Horses	1,000	80

== Transportation ==
=== Ground travel ===
West from Addis Ababa, Awash 572 km via Harar and Jijiga to Degehabur

=== Air travel ===
Somali Regional State has 3 international airport and 2 commercial airports. The international airports are Jijiga Airport, Gode Airport, and Kabri Dar Airport, The 2 commercial airports are Dolo Airport, and Shilavo Airport.

== Government ==
=== Executive branch ===
The executive branch is headed by the Chief Administrator of Somali Regional State. The current Chief Administrator is Mustafe Mohammed Omer (Cagjar), elected on 22 August 2018. A Vice President of Somali Region succeeds the president in the event of any removal from office, and performs any duties assigned by the president. The current vice president is Adam Farah Ibrahim. The other offices in the executive branch cabinet are the Regional Health Bureau, Educational Bureau, and 18 other officials.

==== List of Chief Administrators of Somali Region ====
No.	Portrait	President (Birth–Death)	Term of office			Party
No.	Portrait	President (Birth–Death)	Took office	Left office	Duration	Party
1		Abdullahi Mohamed Sa'di	23 Jan 1993	Nov 1993	10 months	Ethiopian Somali Democratic League (ESDL)
2		Hassan Jire Qalinle	1993	Apr 1994	1 year	Ethiopian Somali Democratic League (ESDL)
3		Abdirahman Ugas Mohumed Qani	Apr 1994	1995	1 year	Ethiopian Somali Democratic League (ESDL)
4		Ahmed Makahel Hussein	1995	Jun 1995	4 months, 15 days	Ethiopian Somali Democratic League (ESDL)
5		Eid Daahir Farah	Jun 1995	Oct 1997	2 years, 4 months	Ethiopian Somali Democratic League (ESDL)
6		Khader Ma'alen Ali	Oct 1997	Oct 2000	3 years	Ethiopian Somali Democratic League (ESDL) (until 1998)
6		Khader Ma'alen Ali	Oct 1997	Oct 2000	3 years	Ethiopian Somali People's Democratic Party (ESPDP)
7		Abdulrashed Dulane	Oct 2000	21 Jul 2003	2 years, 10 months	Ethiopian Somali People's Democratic Party (ESPDP)
8		Abdi Jibril Ali	21 Jul 2003	Oct 2005	2 years, 3 months,	Ethiopian Somali People's Democratic Party (ESPDP)
9		Abdullahi Hassan Mohamed "Lugbuur"	Oct 2005	Nov 2008	3 years, 1 month	Ethiopian Somali People's Democratic Party (ESPDP)
10		Daud Mohamed Ali ''Daud Axmaar''	Nov 2008	12 Jul 2010	1 year, 9 months	Ethiopian Somali People's Democratic Party (ESPDP)
11		Abdi Mohamoud Omar (Abdi Ilay)	12 Jul 2010	8 Aug 2018	8 years, 1 month	Ethiopian Somali People's Democratic Party (ESPDP)
12		Ahmed Abdi Sh. Mohamed (Ilkacase)	8 Aug 2018	22 Aug 2018	14 days	Ethiopian Somali People's Democratic Party (ESPDP)
13		Mustafe Mohummed Omer (Cagjar) (1970–)	22 Aug 2018	Present		Ethiopian Somali People's Democratic Party (ESPDP) (until 3 April 2019)
13		Mustafe Mohummed Omer (Cagjar) (1970–)	22 Aug 2018	Present		Somali Democratic Party (SDP) (until 30 Nov 2019)
13		Mustafe Mohummed Omer (Cagjar) (1970–)	22 Aug 2018	Present		Prosperity Party

=== Judicial branch ===
There are three levels of the Somali region judiciary. The lowest level is the court of common pleas: each woreda maintains its own constitutionally mandated court of common pleas, which maintain jurisdiction over all justiciable matters. The intermediate-level court system is the district court system. Four courts of appeals exist, each retaining jurisdiction over appeals from common pleas, municipal, and county courts in an administrative zone. A case heard in this system is decided by a three-judge panel, and each judge is elected.

The highest-ranking court, the Somali Supreme Court, is Somali's "court of last resort". A Seven-justice panel composes the court, which, by its own discretion, hears appeals from the courts of appeals, and retains original jurisdiction over limited matters. The chief judge is called the Chief of Somali Supreme Court Abdullahi Saed Omar.

=== Legislative branch ===
The State Council, which is the highest administrative body of the state, is made up of 269 members.

=== National politics ===
Somali is represented by

- 6 representatives in The House of Federation (upper chamber) and
- 24 representatives in The House of Peoples' Representatives (lower chamber)

=== Administrative zones ===
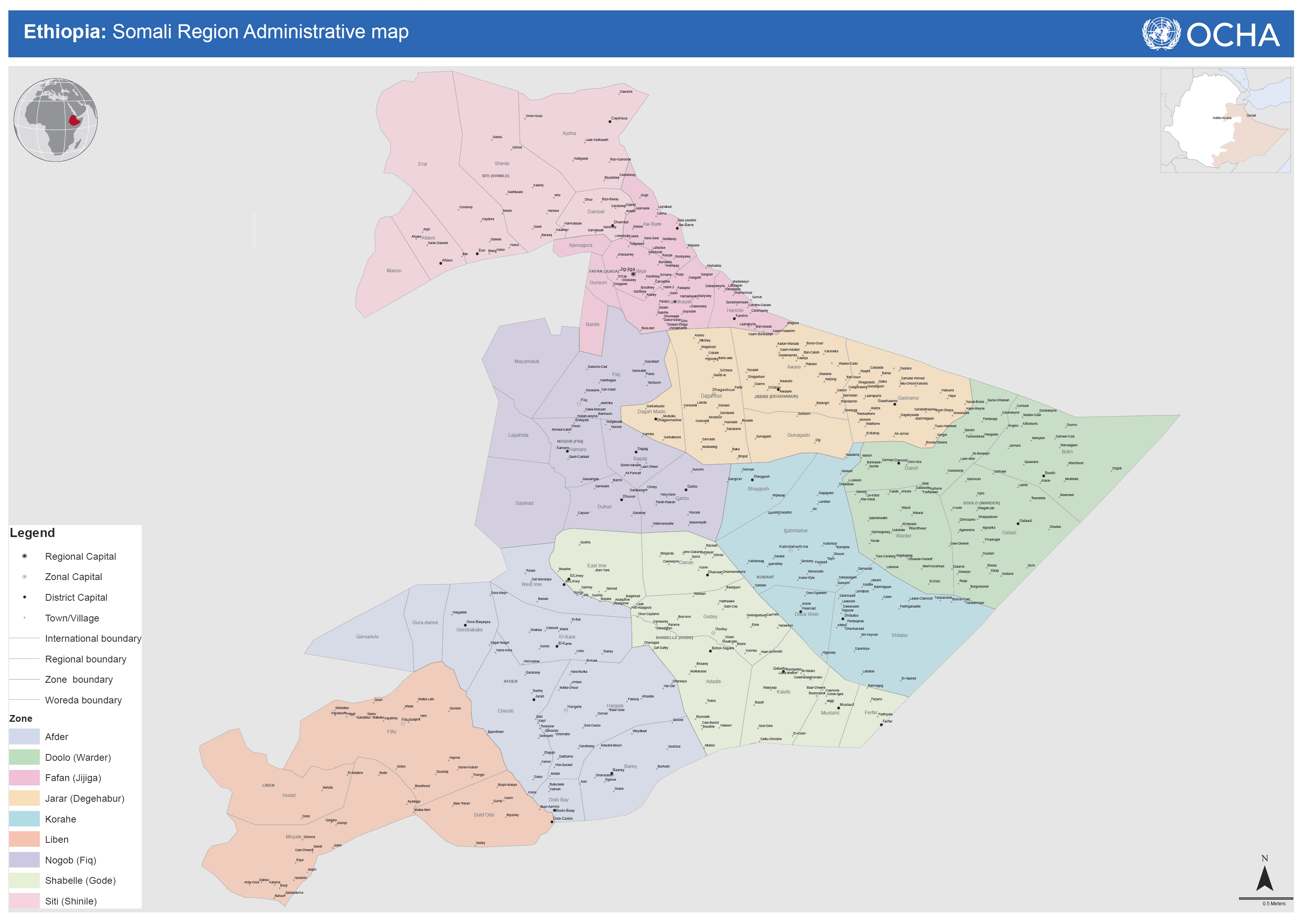
Somali Region Administrative map

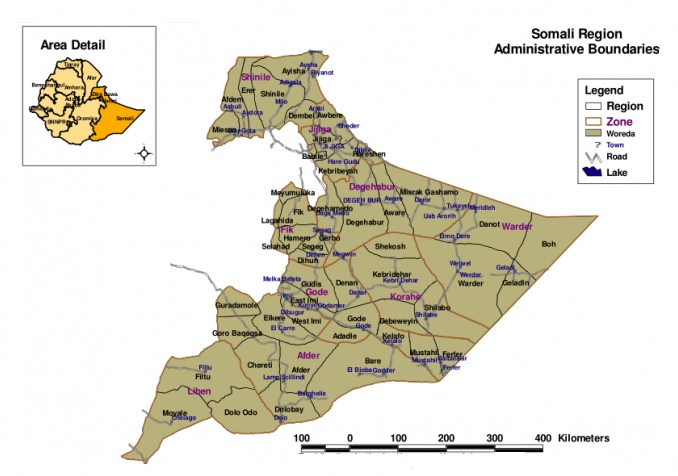
Official zones and woredas

Like other Regions in Ethiopia, Somali Region is subdivided into eleven administrative zones and Six Special administrative zones:

- Afder Zone
- Dollo Zone (formerly Warder)
- Erer Zone
- Fafan Zone (formerly Jigjiga)
- Jarar Zone (formerly Degehabur)
- Korahe Zone
- Liben Zone
- Dhawa Zone
- Nogob Zone (formerly Fiq)
- Shabelle Zone (formerly Godey)
- Sitti Zone (formerly Shinile)
- Degehabur Special Zone (special zone)
- Gode Special Zone (special zone)
- Harawo Special Zone (special zone)
- Kebri Beyah Special Zone (special zone)
- Tog Wajale Special Zone (special zone)

The zones are themselves subdivided into districts.

== See also ==
- Ogaden (clan)
- Jidwaq (clan)
- List of airports in Ethiopia
