= Habr Awal =

Somali clan

Habar Awal
- Isaaq Somali Clan
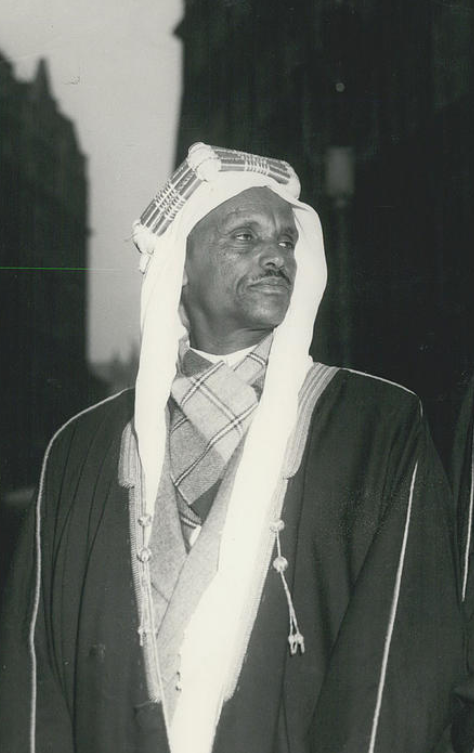
- Habr Awal Sultan Abdulrahman Deria in London 1955 to petition for the Haud Reserved Area
- Ethnicity: Somali
- Location: Somalia, Djibouti, Ethiopia, Kenya
- Descended from: Ishaaq bin Ahmed
- Parent tribe: Isaaq
- Branches: Issa Musa: Abokor Isa; Adam Isa; Idrais Isa; Mohamed Isa; Sa'ad Musa: Abdirahman Sa'ad; Abdalla Sa'ad; Hassan Sa'ad; Isaaq Sa'ad
- Language: Somali
- Religion: Sunni Islam

The Habr Awal, alternately known as the Zubeyr Awal (Somali: Habar Awal) is one of the largest sub-clans of the wider Isaaq clan family, and is further divided into eight sub-clans of whom the two largest and most prominent are the Issa Musa and Sa'ad Musa sub-clans. Its members form a part of the Habar Magadle confederation.

The Habr Awal traditionally consists of nomadic pastoralists, coastal people, merchants and farmers. They are historically viewed as an affluent clan in the horn Africa that played a huge part for Somaliland's independence. The Habar Awal are politically and economically influential in present-day Somaliland as well as the Horn of Africa at large, and they reside in strategic coastal and fertile lands.

== Distribution ==
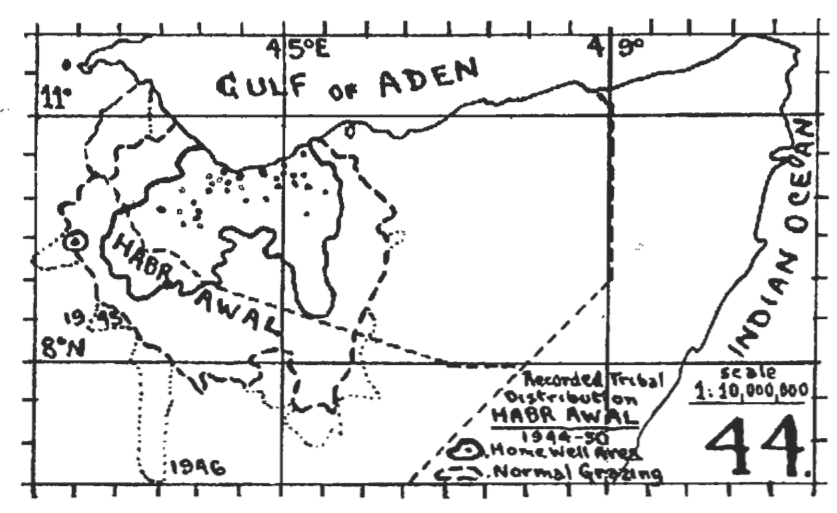
Map of Somaliland showing distribution Habr Awal Tribe in the central and eastern Somaliland

The Habr Awal clan make up the majority in Maroodi Jeex region which is considered the most populous region in Somaliland and the second most populated in the Somali Republic after Banaadir district. They form a majority of the population in the national capital Hargeisa as well as exclusively dominate in the agricultural towns and settlements of Gabiley, Wajaale, Arabsiyo, and Kalabaydh. The Habr Awal are also prevalent in Sahil region, principally in the regional capital and main port city of Berbera, the resort town of El-Sheikh, the historic port city of Bulhar, the historic town of Sheikh as well as Daarbuduq. The clan also partially inhabits the northern portion of the capital city of Burao in Togdheer region as well.

Outside of Somaliland, the Habr Awal also have large settlements in the Somali Region of Ethiopia, specifically in Fafan Zone where they respectively make up the majority in Harshin, Hart Sheik, and Wajaale (Ethiopian Side) towns. They also settle and border Kebri Beyah and Jigjiga in the Fafan Zone. They also have a large settlement in Kenya where they are known as a constituent segment of the Isahakia community. Finally they have a large presence in Djibouti as well, forming a large percentage of the Somali population in Djibouti and within Djibouti they have historically settled in Quartier 3, which is one of the 7 major districts in Djibouti.

== Lineage ==
Ishaaq ibn Ahmed is a semi-legendary mythical figure who allegedly arrived in the Horn of Africa to spread Islam around 12th to 13th century. Hence, Ishaaq married two local women in Somaliland that left him eight sons, one of them being Abdulrahman (Awal). The descendants of those eight sons constitute the Isaaq clan-family.

The grave of Zubeyr Awal, the eponymous ancestor of the Habr Awal subclan of the Isaaq, is located in Jidali in Sanaag which is about 100 km east of the tomb of his grandfather Sheikh Ishaaq bin Ahmed, the founding father of the Isaaq clan, whose tomb is located in the coastal town of Maydh.

== History ==
=== Medieval Period (Conquest of Abyssinia) ===
Historically, the Habr Awal were part of the Adal Sultanate and are mentioned in the renowned "Futuh al-Habasha" for their major contributions in the Ethiopian-Adal war as the Habr Magaadle along with the Habar Yoonis, Arap, Ayub and Eidagalle clans against the Ethiopian Empire, and also for producing a historical figure known as Ahmad Girri bin Husain who was the righthand partner of Ahmad ibn Ibrahim al-Ghazi and a chieftain for the Habr Magaadle forces during the Ethiopian–Adal war.

=== Sa'ad Musa ===
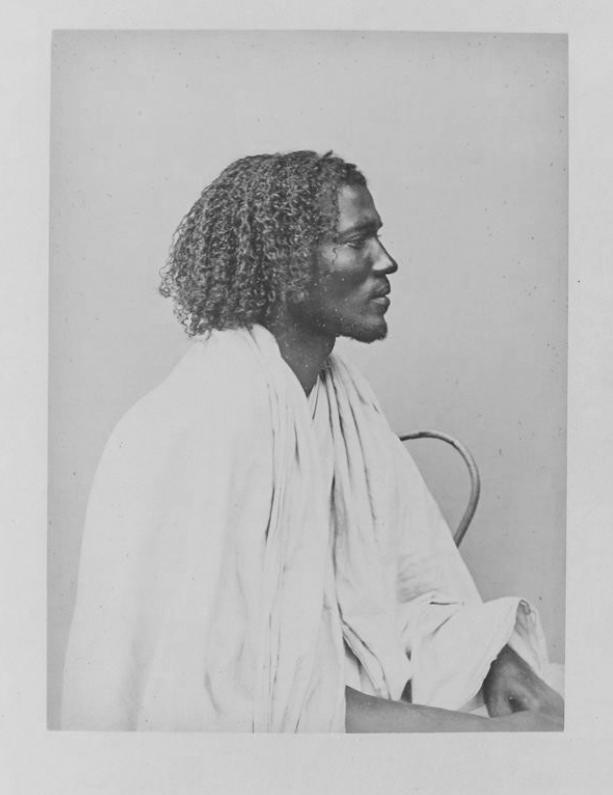
Warsame Yunis of the Saad Musa Habr Awal, photographed by Roland Bonaparte, 1890

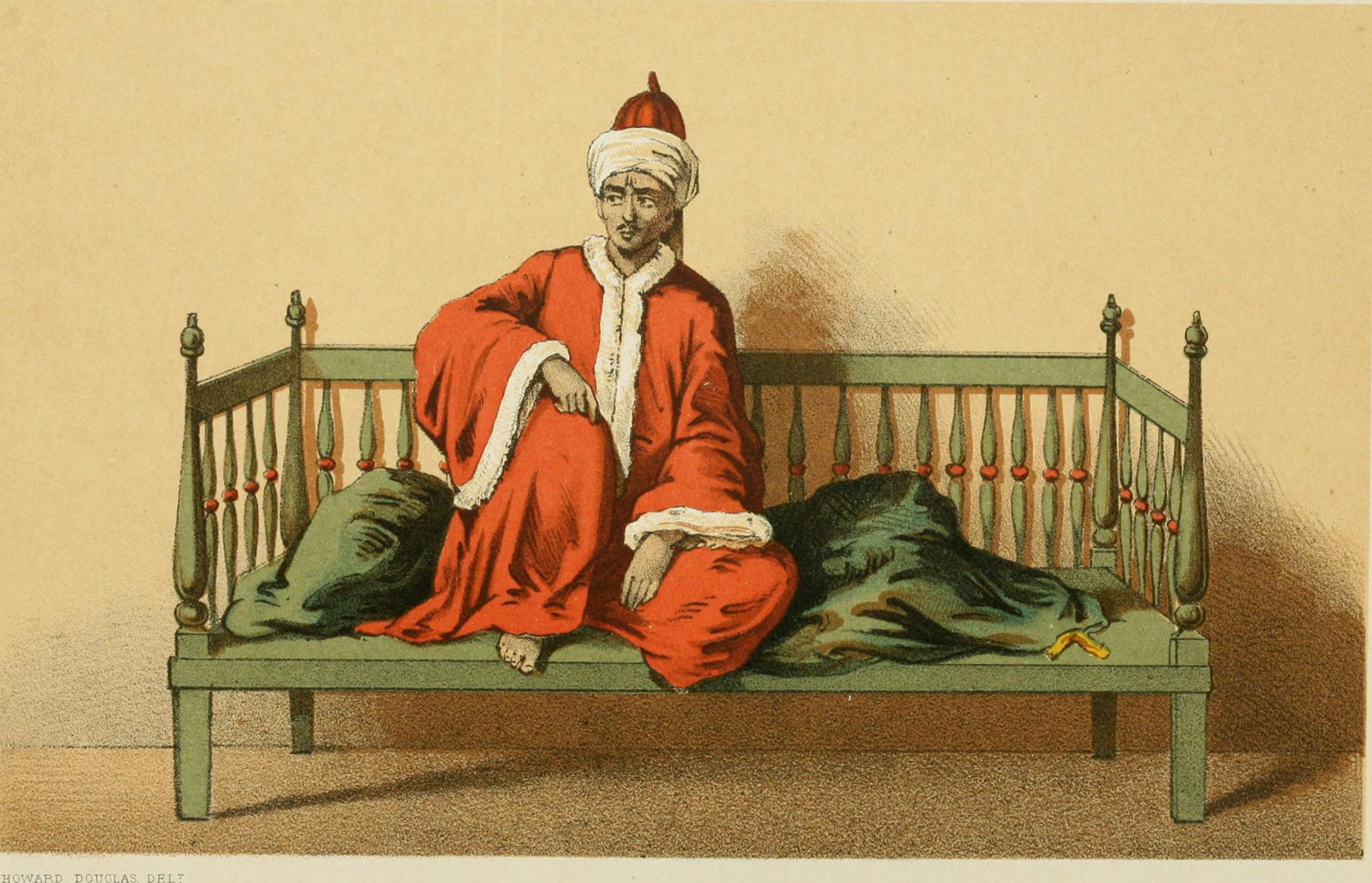
Ahmad Bin Abi Bakr, Emir of Harar and ally of the Habr Awal

The Habr Awal have a rich mercantile history largely due to their possession of the major Somali port of Berbera, which was the chief port and settlement of Habr Awal clan during the early modern period. The clan had strong ties to the Emirate of Harar and Emirs would hold Habr Awal merchants in their court with high esteem with Richard Burton noting their influence in Emir Ahmad III ibn Abu Bakr's court and discussions with the Vizier Mohammed.

The Habr Awal as a whole are a rich people, mainly thanks to the trade passing through the port of Berbera which lies in the territory of the Sa’ad Musa.

In this way the tribes occupying the tract of country through which the main caravan or trade routes passed accumulated a good deal of wealth, while those like the Ayal Ahmed, fortunate enough to possess a port so favored by Nature as Berbera, naturally soon became rich.

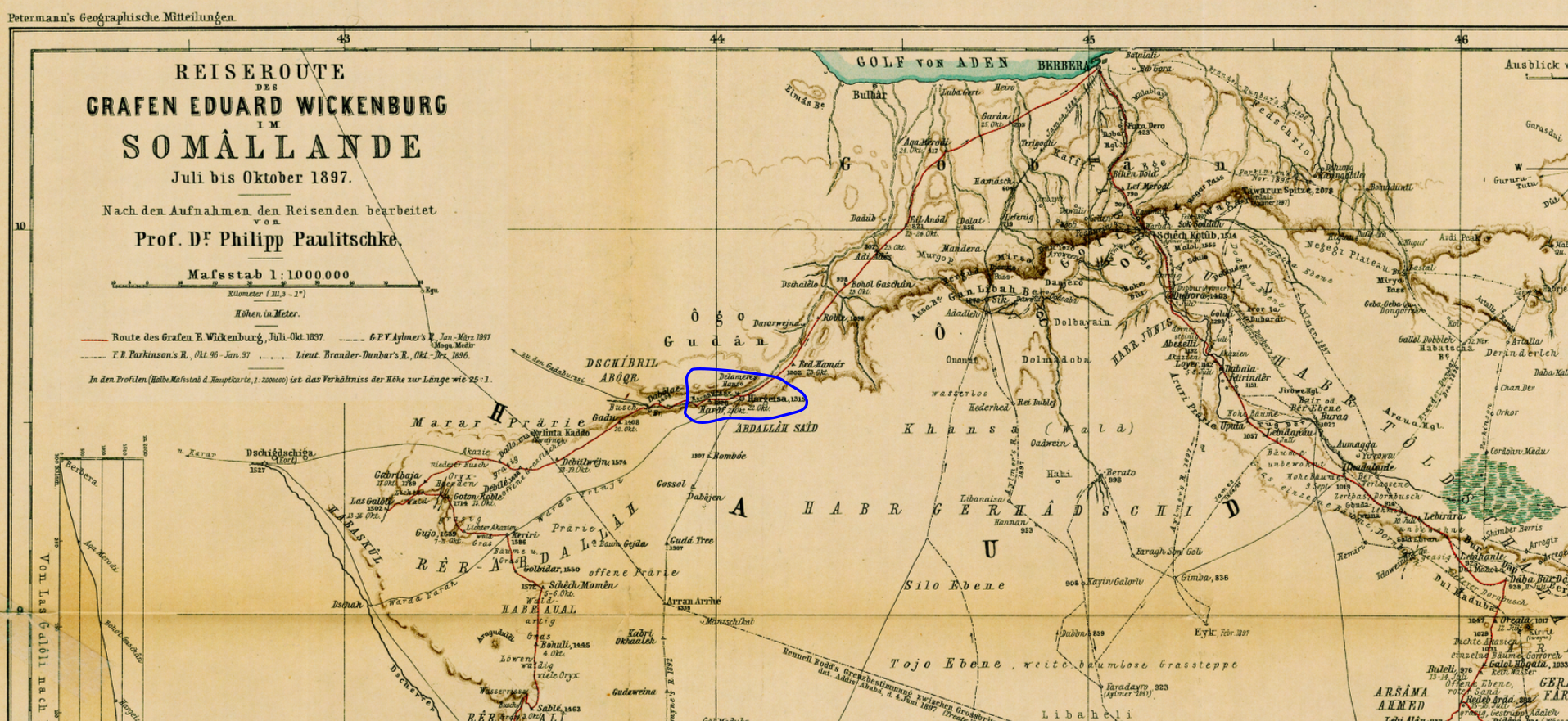
Paulitschke's map covering critical trade routes in 1898

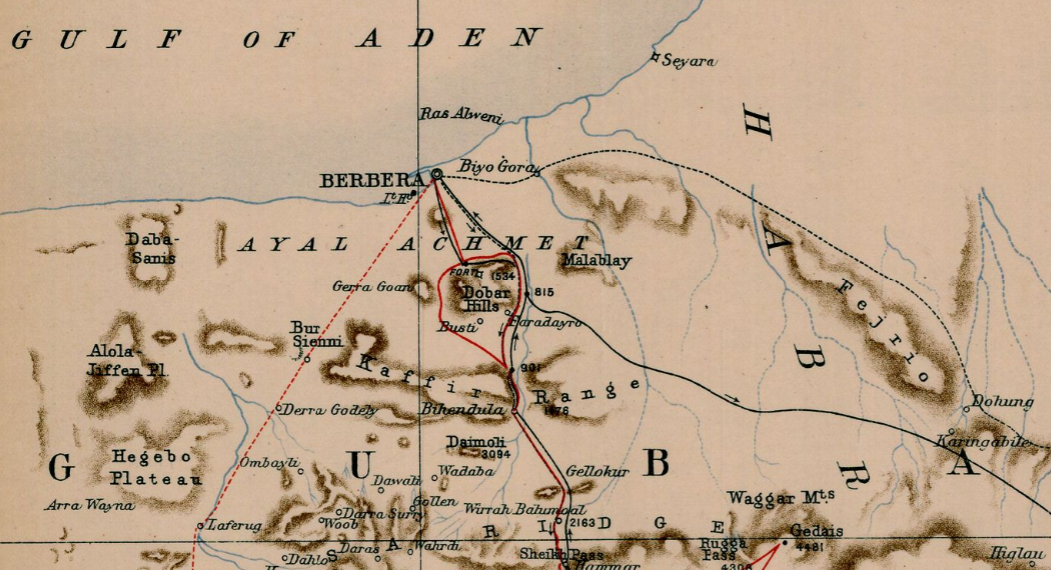
Trade routes leading into Berbera with the 'Ayal Achmet' (Reer Ahmed Nuh) located in & around Berbera and the easterly fort of Siyara visible

The Habr Awal merchants had extensive trade relations with Arab and Indian merchants from Arabia and the Indian subcontinent respectively. When these foreign traders arrived in Berbera and Bulhar to conduct trade, there was a mutually beneficial arrangement based on the abban (protection) system between them and the local Reer Yunis Nuh (Ayyal Yunis) and Ahmed Nuh (Ayyal Ahmed) lineages of Sa’ad Musa, Habr Awal:

Before this, and prior to the British settlement at Aden in 1839, the Ayyal Yunis and Ayyal Ahmed lineages of the Habr Awal clan had held Berbera and jointly managed its trade, sharing in the profits on all commercial transactions as ‘protectors’ (abans) of foreign merchants from Arabia and India. When under the stimulus of developments at Aden the port's prosperity markedly increased, the numerically dominant Ayyal Yunis drove out their rival kinsmen and declared themselves commercial masters of Berbera. This led to a feud in which each side sought outside help; the defeated Ayyal Ahmed turned to Haji Shirmarke ‘Ali and his Habr Yunis clansmen for support. With this backing, they were then able to re-establish themselves and to expel the Ayyal Yunis who moved to the small roadstead of Bulhar, some miles to the west of Berbera.

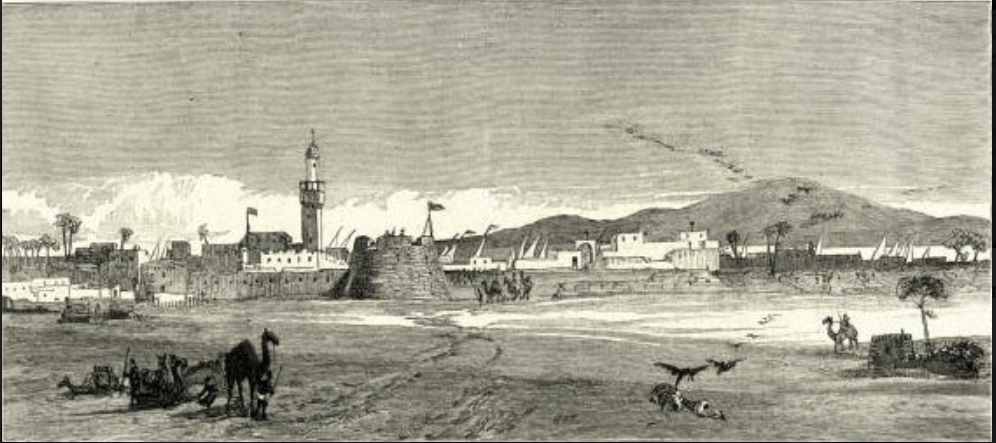
Illustration of Berbera, 1884

Not only did the Habr Awal host foreign merchants at their ports, they also conducted trade missions on their own vessels to the Arabian ports. The majority of the Somali merchants who frequented Aden and other Southern Arabian ports hailed from the Habr Awal clan. They procured various raw goods from Harar and the interior in exchange for manufactured goods. During their stay, the Habr Awal rented their own houses and hired their own servants, whereas other Somali clans tended to stay with relatives already established across the Gulf.

Merchants. — These are generally members of the Habr Awal tribe. They bring from Harrar and the Galla country, coffee, saffron (bastard), tusks (ivory), and feathers, taking away in return zinc, brass, broad cloth, and piece goods. They remain in Aden for about twenty days at a time during the trading season, which lasts about nine months,' making four trips. During their residence they hire a house, and are accompanied by their own domestics.

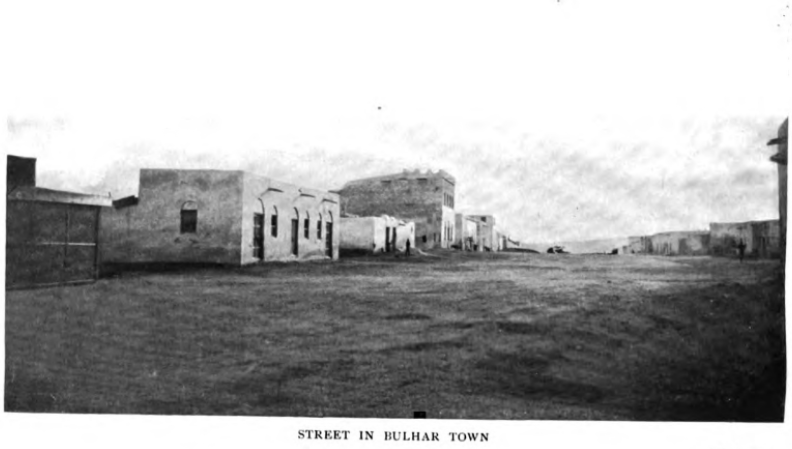
Street in Bulhar

In the interior, Habr Awal trade caravans (khafilas) were a frequent sight according to contemporary European accounts of the Somali Peninsula:

On leaving Hargeisa we travelled for many miles through beautiful park-like land, alive with birds and jungle fowl. We met the usual Somali khafilas [trading caravans] of Habr-Awal men, carrying their skins, gums, ghee, and coffee to our port at Bulhar, situated between Berbera and Zeila.

The Somalis from the deep interior, principally those from the Ogaden, also gained most of their resources from the Habr Awal merchants who they called "iidoor", an enviable pejorative meaning merchant or trader, a reference to the mercantile nature of the Habr Awal traders at the time. The coastal Habr Awal (mainly the Reer Ahmed Nuh) regularly acted as brokers/middlemen for the Somali clans of the interior who wished to take their goods to the ports of Berbera and Bulhar:

The custom is for the Ayal Achmet (Berbera tribe) to act as brokers, and too often most of the profits stick to the hands of the middleman. Till lately no Ogadayn ever went to the coast, but entrusted the goods to coast traders.

==== Battle of Berbera ====
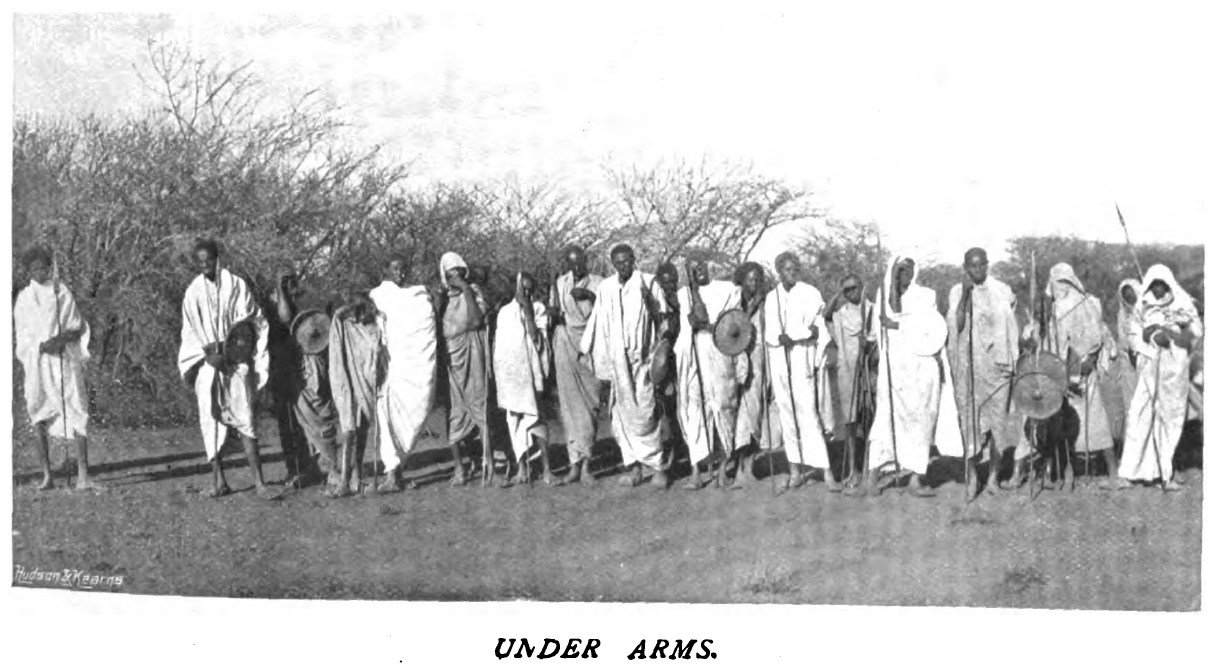
Sa'ad Musa warriors preparing for battle near Hargeisa

When a British vessel named the Mary Anne attempted to dock in Berbera's port in 1825 it was attacked and multiple members of the crew were massacred by the Habr Awal. In response the Royal Navy enforced a blockade and some accounts narrate a bombardment of the city. In 1827 two years later the British arrived and extended an offer to relieve the blockade which had halted Berbera's lucrative trade in exchange for indemnity. Following this initial suggestion the Battle of Berbera 1827 would break out. After the Habr Awal defeat, 15,000 Spanish dollars was to be paid by the Habr Awal leaders for the destruction of the ship and loss of life. The Isaaq Sultan Farah Guled and Haji Ali penned a letter to Sultan bin Saqr Al Qasimi of Ras Al Khaimah requesting military assistance and joint religious war against the British. This would not materialize as Sultan Saqr was incapacitated by prior Persian Gulf campaign of 1819 and was unable to send aid to Berbera. Alongside their stronghold in the Persian Gulf & Gulf of Oman the Qasimi were very active both militarily and economically in the Gulf of Aden and were given to plunder and attack ships as far west as the Mocha on the Red Sea. They had numerous commercial ties with the Somalis, leading vessels from Ras Al Khaimah and the Persian Gulf to regularly attend trade fairs in the large ports of Berbera and Zeila and were very familiar with the Isaaq.

Consequently, The Habr Awal clan signed a protectorate treaty with the British Empire on 14 July 1884. The Habr Awal continued to have a lucrative trading agreement with their foreign contacts, many of whom were also under British rule in their respective nations. The British established the capital of the British Somaliland protectorate at Berbera, but later moved the capital to Hargeisa in 1941.

==== Migration South from the Coast to the Interior ====
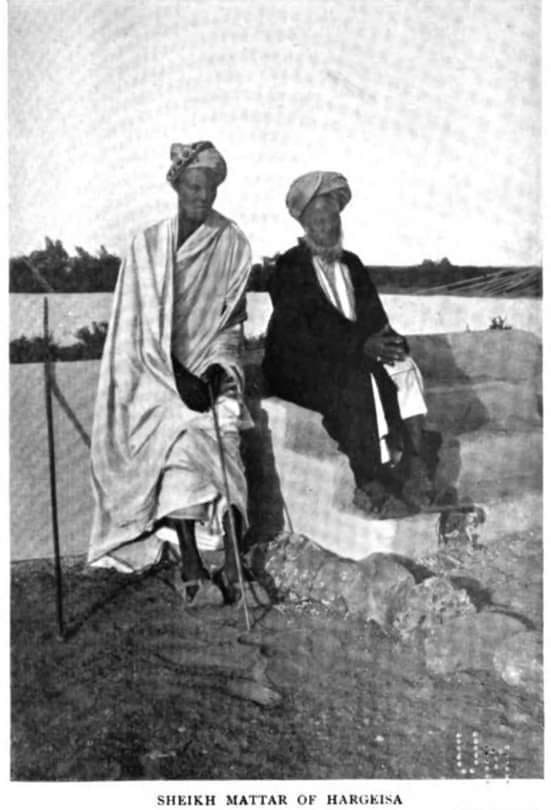
Sheikh Madar (right), the founding father of modern Hargeisa, photographed in 1912 by Ralph E Brockman

In the mid 19th century Hargeisa and the surrounding region was a hotbed of clan strife with raids being made on caravans attempting to pass through. Madar alongside other Sufi sheikhs established the Jama'a Weyn or the big congregation in Hargeisa. The new congregation adhered to the 900 year old Qadiriyya order established by renowned Shaykh Abdul Qadir Gilani and introduced new practices that would put Hargeisa on the trajectory to becoming the largest Somali city in Somaliland and the second largest Somali inhabited city to date. Hargeisa and its environs had suitable soil and ample water supply for agriculture yet the pastoralists had not been taking advantage of this fact. Madar alongside the other leaders of Jam'a Weyn introduced the cultivation of sorghum and the new construction of permanent housing and creating his grand mosque in 1883. The Sheikh was also responsible for leading the communal prayers supplicating to Allah for rain in a ritual known as roobdoon. Sheikh Madar and Isaaq Sultan Deria Hassan met outside Hargeisa in 1870 to discuss issues regarding the new town and agreed that poaching and tree cutting in the vicinity should be banned. The Saad Musa branch of the Habr Awal began to settle in Hargeisa under the watch of Madar and the Sultan Deria and eagerly took up the new farming methods.

The Jama'a formed a nucleus that attracted other pastoralists to come and settle in the burgeoning town. As well, clan conflicts were mitigated as the new community had managed to unify on a shared religious identity rather than aligning strictly on traditional clan basis. With the Sheikh succeeding in the task delegated to him by his master Sheikh Kabir. Religious leaders in the Jama'a took it upon themselves to place the disabled in the region under their care.

==== Lobbying for British Somaliland Independence ====
In the year 1955, Sultan Abdulrahman Garad Deria was a member of a 4 delegation team of politicians and Sultans to London, United Kingdom. Their goal was to petition and pressure the British Government in returning lost treaty territory known as the 'Haud Reserve Area' ceded to Ethiopian Empire during the Anglo Ethiopian treaty of 1954.

In Imperial Policies and Nationalism in The Decolonization of Somaliland, 1954-1960, Historian Jama Mohamed writes:

The N.U.F. campaigned for the return of the territories both in Somaliland and abroad. In March 1955, for instance, a delegation consisting of Michael Mariano, Abokor Haji Farah and Abdi Dahir went to Mogadisho to win the support and co-operation of the nationalist groups in Somalia. And in February and May 1955 another delegation consisting of two traditional Sultans (Sultan Abdillahi Sultan Deria, and Suldaan Abdulrahman Gaarad Deria), and two Western-educated moderate politicians (Michael Mariano, Abdirahman Ali Mohamed Dubeh) visited London and New York. During their tour of London, they formally met and discussed the issue with the Secretary of State for the Colonies, Alan Lennox-Boyd. They told Lennox-Boyd about the 1885 Anglo-Somali treaties. Under the agreements, Michael Mariano stated, the British Government 'undertook never to cede, sell, mortgage or otherwise give for occupation, save to the British Government, any portion of the territory inhabited by them or being under their control'. But now the Somali people 'have heard that their land was being given to Ethiopia under an Anglo-Ethiopian Treaty of 1897'. That treaty, however, was 'in conflict' with the Anglo-Somali treaties 'which took precedence in time' over the 1897 Anglo-Ethiopian Treaty[.] The British Government had 'exceeded its powers when it concluded the 1897 Treaty and ... the 1897 Treaty was not binding on the tribes.' Sultan Abdillahi also added that the 1954 agreement was a 'great shock to the Somali people' since they had not been told about the negotiations, and since the British Government had been administering the area since 1941. The delegates requested, as Sultan Abdulrahman put it, the postponement of the implementation of the agreement to 'grant the delegation time to put up their case' in Parliament and in international organizations.

=== Issa Musa ===
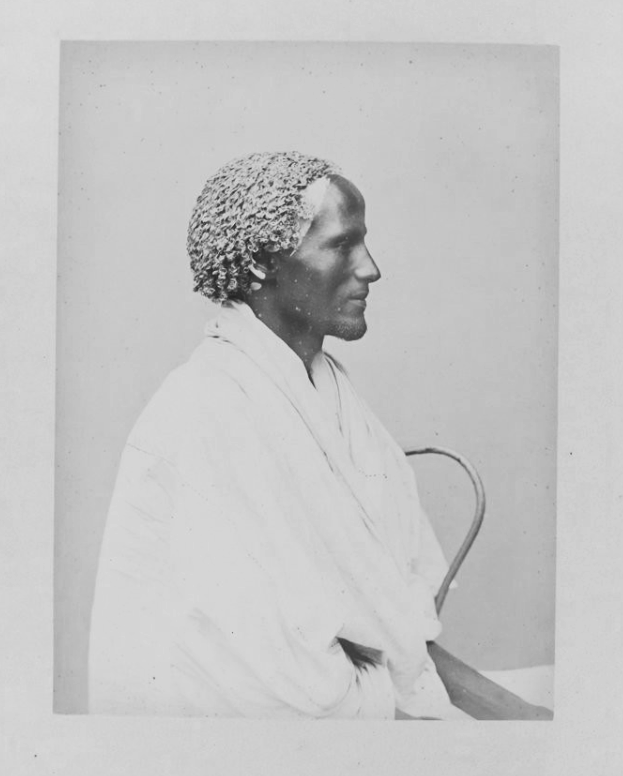
Ahmed Amar age 25 of the Issa Musa Habr Awal, photographed by Roland Bonaparte in 1890

Historically, the Isa Musa made use of the very valuable caravan trade in the Horn of Africa. Deriving income from arriving caravans into the markets of the coastal city of Berbera. The Isa Musa were able to impose a transit duty of 4 units of ana per camel loaded with merchandise.

The Isa Musa, whose pasture area is the coastal plain, also raise a transit duty of 4 anas (approx. 48 pfennigs) from the caravans for the loaded dromedar and 1 ana for each sheep and each goat, which from other tribes after the Markets to be brought from Berbera.

The Italian explorer and geographer Luigi Robecchi Brichetti had a similar remark in aspect of the valuable caravan trade, where he also mentioned the related Ayal Ahmad of Habr Awal - who reserved the title as the Abban of Berbera. According to the account of Bricchetti, the Isa Musa were able to attain revenue thanks to the busy caravan traffic entering & leaving the coastal and historical city of Berbera

They pass for skilled camel breeders and intelligent caravan organizers [Ayal Achmed]. And such are also the different families of the Isa Musa, who live off the caravan traffic with the Ogaden, going up to Uebi [Webi] along the Faf (Fafan) route.

==== Establishment of Issa Musa Sultanate ====
With Diriiye's eventual death, his son Abdulrahman was crowned and the first Habr Awal leader to style himself as 'Sultan' rather than Garaad. Abdulrahman was very much like his father however was much more active in protectorate affairs. When the Eidagale attempted to raid the Issa Musa, a son of the Habr Yunis Sultan joined the raid and when the raiders were pursued he was killed. The Sultan of the Habr Yunis approached Abdulrahman to resolve the dispute and wanted him to compel the Issa Musa to pay mag for the Sultan's son. According to traditional Somali xeer restitution is not paid when one is killed in self defense. So the Issa Musa refused and banged their shields in disproval of Abdulrahman's judgement.

Cismaan Haariyey a poet stood and recited the following geeraar reaffirming his respect but disagreeing with Sultan Abdulrahman. After this the Issa Musa would leave and go on to crown their first Sultan, Sultan Koshin in 1949 marking their independence from their larger Saad Musa brethren.

Ninka Qaaliya joogee
Ka qoteysta hadhuudhkiyo
Ninka geeri qodaayiyo
Ka qasaalaya geela
Suldaanaw bal qiyaasoo
Wax ma qaybsan karaan?
Suldaanow kuma caayin
Ku canaannana maayo
Ceebna kuu gudi maayo
Calafna kaa sugi maayo
Cuudkii aannu ku siinniyo
Cadradii gabadhiinna
Marnaba kaa celin maayo
Ceynkaagaa rag ahaayoon
Caleentii boqor saarray baa
Cuurkii Muuse Subeer
Aakhiro u celinaaya

— Cismaan Haayirey Suldaanow Kuma Caayin
Translation:

The man who stands in wealth
Who harvests the millet
The man who's digging for death
And the ones looking after the camels
Oh Suldaan think about it
Can they agree?
Oh Suldaan I have not insulted you
And I am not reprimanding you
I am not compensating you for shame
I expect no wealth from you
The respect we give you
The beautiful young women
We will never take back from you
Men who were like you
Who we put leaves on as king
Are keeping back
The Muuse Subeer people

==== Contemporary Era ====
The Issa Musse have produced many prominent Somali figures with the Undersecretary General of the United Nations Abdulrahim Abby Farah, and most prominently the first Somali Prime Minister & second President of Somaliland Muhammad Haji Ibrahim Egal, who led the former British Somaliland protectorate to independence in July 1960 to form the Somali Republic. To date, Egal has been the only Isaaq Prime Minister of Somalia.

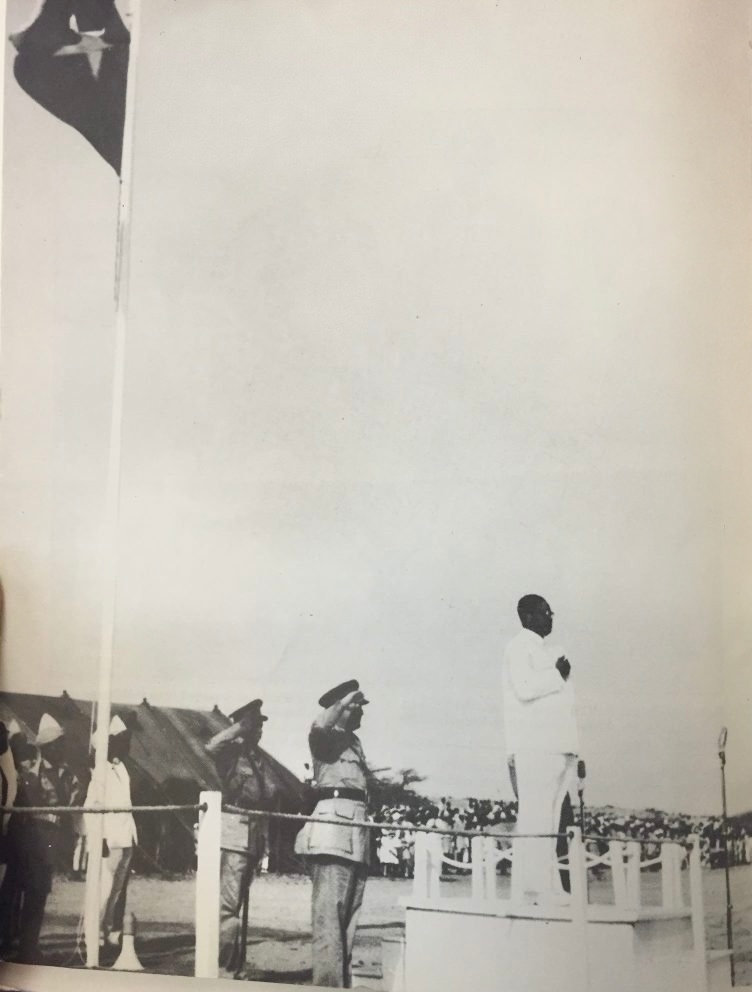
Somaliland Flying for the first time: The White and Blue Somali Flag at the Independence Celebrations on 26 June 1960 Prime Minister Egal of the State of Somaliland salutes the flag.

On 26 June 1960 Egal was Prime minister of the newly independent State of Somaliland, which merged five days later with the former Trust Territory of Somalia to form the Somali Republic on July 1, 1960.

Most prominently, Somaliland's political institutions were essentially from the ground up under the consequential rule of Egal . During his 9-year tenure as President of Somaliland, Egal managed to disarm local rebel groups, stabilized the northwestern Somaliland region's economy, and established informal trade ties with foreign countries. He also introduced the Somaliland shilling, passport and a newly redesigned flag. In addition, Egal created the Somaliland Armed Forces, the most effective Somali armed forces since the disbandment of the Somali National Army in 1991.

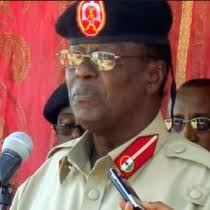
General Mohamed Hasan Abdullahi "Jidhif", renowned for his offensive capturing the port city of Zeila in the late 1980s on behalf of the SNM.

=== Somali Civil War and the Somali National Movement ===
The Somali National Movement (SNM) was a 1980s–1990s rebel group. The SNM at 1981 founding in London it elected Ahmed Mohamed Gulaid from the Habr Awal clan as its first chairman, who stated that the group's explicit purpose was to overthrow the Siad Barre military regime. The SNM gathered its main base of support from members of the Isaaq clan, who formed and supported the movement in response to years of systematic discrimination by the Siad Barre government.

As commander of the 99th division, General Mohamed Hasan Abdullahi (Jidhif) also established a Somali National Movement military base in Zeila where the SNM occupied the Awdal region for 4 years and successfully defeated attempts by USF militia forces loyal to Djibouti who tried to take advantage of the fall of Siad Barre's Military Junta in 1991 and annex the city of Zeila.

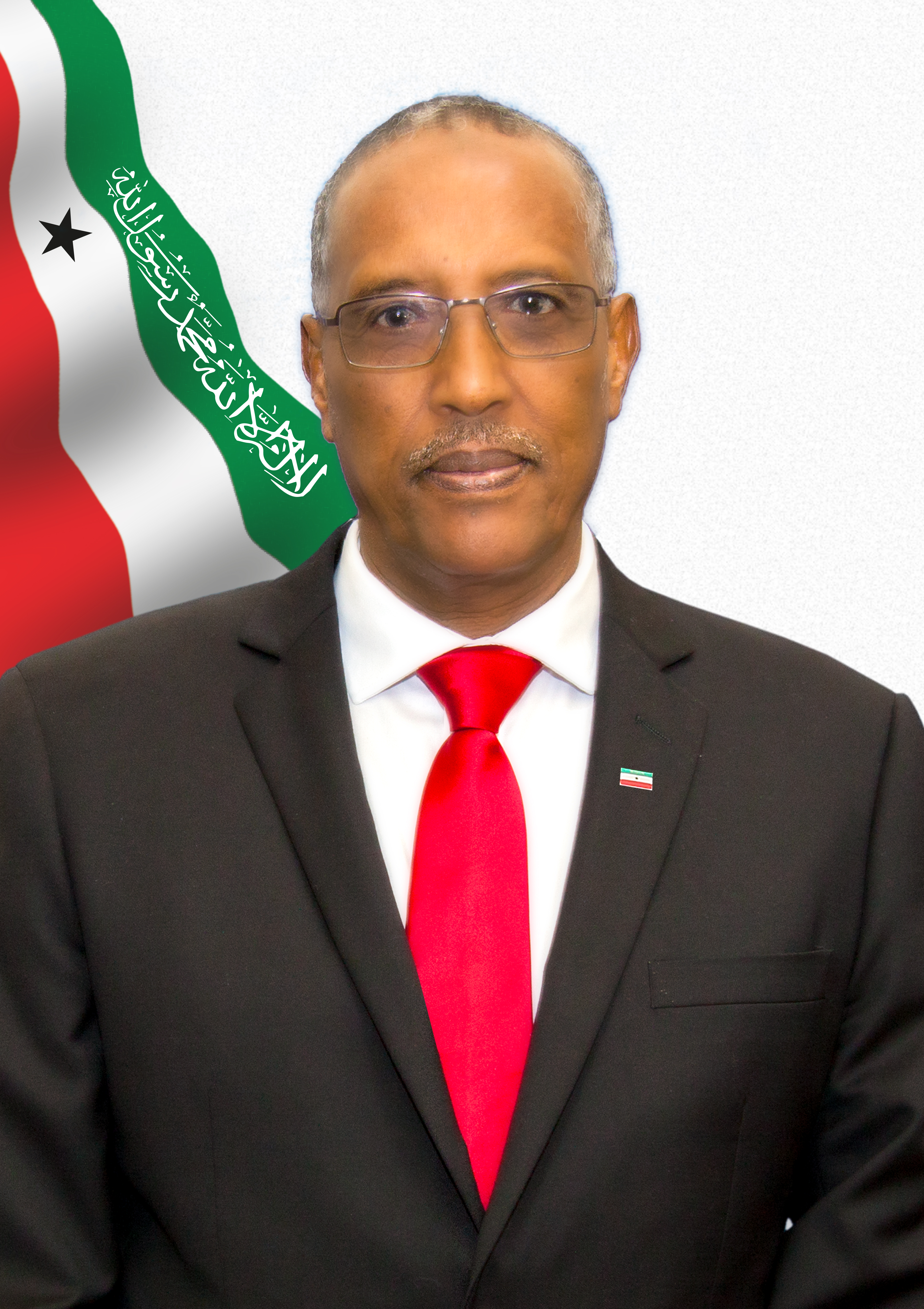
Colonel Muse Bihi Abdi, fifth President of Somaliland, and former military officer who served as a Somali Air Force pilot before defecting to the SNM in the mid-1980s where he commanded rebel forces.

List of prominent Habr Awal SNM Commanders (Mujahids).

- Colonel Abdillahi Askar Barkhad
- Abdikarim Hashi Elmi
- Adan Dhamah
- Adan Shiine
- Ahmed Jama Sabban (Janan Oogo)
- Ahmed Mohamed Gulaid
- Ahmed Dhagah
- Ahmed Ibrahim (Raage Bidaar)
- Ahmed Golhaye
- Ahmed Mohamed Hasan (Ahmed Japan)
- Ali Gurey
- General Ali Hussein Abdi
- Boobe Yusuf Dualeh
- General Hassan Yonis Habane
- Haybe Ahmed Gure (Haybe Laambad)
- Hamud Ibrahim Ismail
- Professor Ibrahim Megag Samatar
- Ibrahim Dhagahweyne
- Sheikh Ibrahim Madar
- Mohamed Elmi Samatar Galan
- General Mohamed Hasan Abdullahi (Jidhif)
- Mohamed Hashi Elmi
- Mohamed Hasan (Gacmo Dheere)
- Mahdi Ali Farah
- Colonel Muse Bihi Abdi
- Sheikh Yusuf Ali Sheikh Madar
- Yahya Haji Ibrahim

== Garaads and Sultans of the Habr Awal ==
The Habr Awal have a long tradition of leadership and are led by a Sultan from the Ahmed Abdalla branch - a numerous subclan of Saad Musa that mainly reside in Ethiopia. Historically preferring to use the native term Garaad like the Warsangeli, both clans have since changed the name of the title to Suldaan although the role is identical. Habr Awal Garaads would rally men in times of war and settle large disputes with other clans filling the role as the ultimate peacemaker (nabadoon). The first Garaad Biniin was crowned around a similar time as the first Habr Yunis Sultan Diriiye Ainasha, with both of these large subclans breaking from the tutelage of the Eidagale who were the wider leaders of the Isaaq Sultanate. Following his death, the Habr Awal did not crown a new Garaad for several years as Biniin's heirs were too young, with Garaad Abdalla being crowned when he came of age. Fighting in the southern limits of Habr Awal territory to protect the clan against its enemies and fighting off raids. In one incident he narrowly avoided a Jidwaaq surprise attack with the Ahmed Abdalla rallying quickly and forcing the raiders to flee.

	Name	Reign From	Reign Till
1	Garaad Biniin (first Garaad)		
2	Garaad Abdalla Garaad Biniin		
3	Garaad Askar Garaad Abdalla		
4	Garaad Diriiye Garaad Abdalla		
5	Sultan Abdulrahman Garaad Diriiye (adopted Sultan title)		
6	Sultan Abdillahi Sultan Abdulrahman		
7	Sultan Abdirizaq Sultan Abdillahi		
8	Sultan Hassan Sultan Abdillahi		

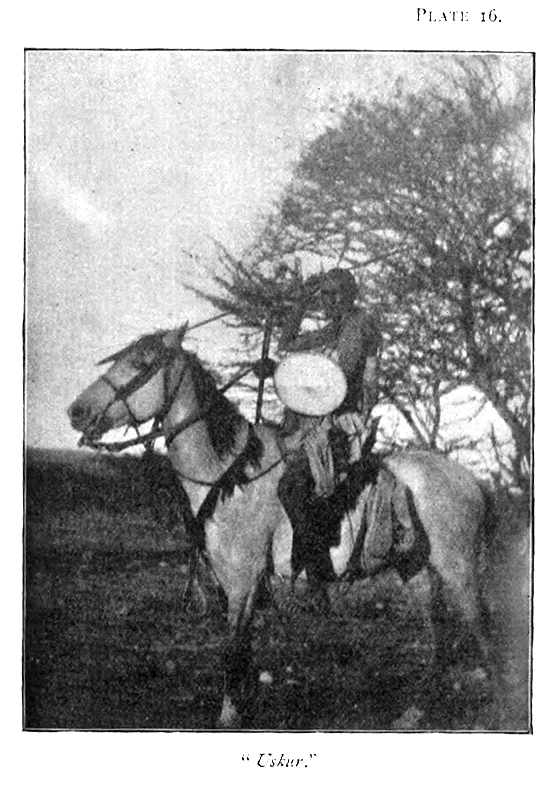
Future Garaad Askar photographed in 1895

Garaad Abdalla served for several decades and was received by travelling British officials near the southern limit of the protectorate in 1894 concerning expansion by General Ras Makonen on behalf of Menelik II. Garaad Abdalla alongside many other leaders in British Somaliland such as Sultan Deria Hassan and Sheikh Madar were worried about a devastating raid by the Abyssinian forces aimed at the burgeoning town Hargeisa and its environs. The Garaad was contacted by Makonen just two years later asking him and the Habr Awal to join the Ethiopian Empire but was rebuffed. Garaad Abdalla was approached by the Sultan of Habr Yunis when they had faced a drought, the Habr Yunis requested access to Habr Awal wells to water. Abdalla granted the request but some members of his clan thought he was too generous and helping the Habr Yunis at the expense of the wellbeing of their own stock. Chief amongst these people was his 15 year old Askar. When some of the Habr Yunis party came to water, Askar stepped in between the well and the men barring them access. He was reprimanded for his foolishness and told to step aside and obey his father's wishes. Enraged Askar stabbed the man who reprimanded him and war almost broke out at this action.

A wise Habr Awal bard from Bulhar named Aami stood and recited a gabay

The words too many have already been spoken about Yunis' foolish words
But righteous judgement pious to you according to ancient custom, bringing peace and (firmly) like a mountain
Very close to you lurk people, you enemies, from primeval times their commemorating a feud
If the time came when you were blinded by the quarrel, you would not respect it
Without hesitation, they suddenly fell upon you
All hostile tribes have heard the news of your quarrel
Like vultures, they all look greedily at your flesh!

The parties were moved by his words and mediated their dispute. Garaad Abdalla gave the hand of one of his daughters to the poet as a reward for his efforts. Following Abdalla's death, his eldest son Askar succeeded him as Garaad. Askar was a skilled horseman and fought in offensive with the southern sections of the clan against the Dervish who had begun raiding Habr Awal and other clans in the region. Sheikh Madar rallied the northern sections of the Habr Awal who unlike the Ahmed Abdalla and a few others, did reside mainly inside the borders of British Somaliland. Following Askaar's death his younger brother Diriiye took the mantle of Garaad and unlike his brother and father was more focused on the concerns of the Habr Awal community as a period of relative peace had set in following the defeat of the Dervishes, decreasing the need for fighting. Diriiye was faced with a parallel challenger to his role as Garaad and the Habr Awal rallied behind him and rebuffed the pretender.

== Branches ==
In the Isaaq clan-family, component clans are divided into two uterine divisions, as shown in the genealogy. The first division is between those lineages descended from sons of Sheikh Ishaaq by a Harari woman – the Habr Habuusheed – and those descended from sons of Sheikh Ishaaq by a Somali woman of the Magaadle sub-clan of the Dir – the Habr Magaadle. Indeed, most of the largest clans of the clan-family are in fact uterine alliances hence the matronymic "Habr" which in archaic Somali means "mother". This is illustrated in the following clan structure. DNA analysis of Habr Awal clan members inhabiting Djibouti found that all of the individuals belonged to the EV32 subclade of the Y-DNA E1b1b paternal haplogroup.

A summarized clan family tree of major Habr Awal subclans is presented below.

Ahmed Abdalla (Reer Ahmed Abdalla) is The Sultan of Habr Awal's Royal Lineage

Sheikh Ishaaq bin Ahmed bin Muhammad
  - Habr Habuusheed
    - Ahmed (Tol-Ja’lo)
    - Muse
    - Ibrahim
    - Muhammad
  - Habr Magaadle
    - Ismail
    - Ayub
    - Muhammad
    - Abdirahman (Habr Awal)
      - Sa'ad Muuse
        - Abdirahman Sa'ad
        - Abdalla Sa'ad
        - Hassan Sa'ad
          - Abdalla Hassan
        - Isaaq Sa'ad
          - Makahil
            - Nuh Makahil
            - Abokor Makahil
            - Cumar Makahil
            - Mohammed Makahil
            - Hassan Makahil
              - Ali Hassan
              - Jibril Hassan
              - Rooble Hassan
              - Osman Hassan
            - Mohammed Isaaq (Abbas)
            - Isse Isaaq (Ciise Carab)
            - Musa (Ase) Isaaq
            - Yeesif Isaaq
            - Abokor Isaaq
              - Ugaadh Abokor (Ugaadhyahan)
              - Abdalla Abokor
              - Hussein Abokor
                - Osman Hussein (Cismaannada)
                - Jibril Hussein
                  - Ismail Jibril
                    - Nuh Ismail
                      - Yunis Nuh (Reer Yunis Nuh)
                        - Shirdoon Yonis (Reer Shirdoon)
                        - Hoosh Yonis (Reer Hoosh)
                        - Gadid Yonis (Reer Gadid)
                        - Mohammed Yonis
                      - Ahmed Nuh (Reer Ahmed Nuh)
                    - Said Ismail
                      - Abdalla Said
                        - Samatar Abdalla (Reer Samatar)
                        - Abane Abdalla (Reer Abane)
                        - Ahmed Abdalla (Reer Ahmed Abdalla)
                    - Abdalla Ismail
                    - Ali Ismail
                    - Idris Ismail (Bah Gobo)
                    - Muhumed Ismail (Waran'ad)
                    - Yonis Ismail (Bah Gobo)
                    - Yusuf Ismail
              - Jibril Abokor
                - Adan Jibril (Bahaabar Adan)
                - Ali Jibril
                  - Omar Ali
                    - Abeeb Omar (Baha Omar)
                    - Abtidon Omar (Baha Omar)
                    - Adan Omar
                    - Hussein Qawa Omar (Baha Omar)
                    - Sahal Omar (Baha Omar)
                    - Yonis Omar (Dugeh)
                    - Ismail Omar
                      - Barre Ismail
                        - Hareed Barre (Reer Hareed)
                      - Dalal Ismail (Reer Dalal)
                      - Geedi Ismail 'Gheedi Shide' (Baha Omar)
                      - Hoosh Ismail (Baha Omar)
                      - Higgis Ismail
                      - Idris Ismail
                      - Ollow Ismail
                      - Samatar Ismail
                      - Qayaad Ismail (Baha Omar)
                - Hassan Jibril
                - Mohamed Jibril (Deriyahan)
                - Yonis Jibril (Reer Yonis)
                  - Muuse Yonis
                    - Cabdi Muse Yonis
                  - Caraale yonis
                  - Caynaashe Yonis
                  - Urkurag Yonis
                    - Adan Urkurag
                      - Omar Adan
                      - Ali Adan
                      - Ahmed Adan
      - Issa Muuse
        - Adan Issa
          - Jibril Adan
            - Mohamoud Jibril
            - Hassan Jibril
            - Ibrahim Jibril
            - Ismail Jibril
        - Abokor Issa
          - Hassan Abokor
            - Balle Hassan (Reer Baale)
            - Musa Hassan
        - Idris Issa
          - abdiwadhawr
            - rer dahir
            - rer hayan
          - ali wadhawr
        - Mohamed Issa
          - Mukhtar Mohamed
          - Hassan Mohamed
          - Jibril Mohamed
            - Omar Jibril
            - Abokor Jibril
            - Yonis Jibril
            - Muuse Jibril
              - Ali Muuse
                - Sahal Ali (Reer Sahal)
                - Wa'ays Ali (Reer Wa'ays)
                - Abane Ali (Reer Abane)
                - Had Ali (Reer Had)
                - Hildid Ali (Reer Hildid)
            - Abdirahman Muuse
            - Abdulle Muuse
              - Abdalle Abdulle (Abdalle Qoyan)
              - Hassan Abdulle
                - Ahmed Hassan (Dhogori)
                - Deriyahan Hassan
      - Abdalla Muuse
      - Afgab Muuse(Abdi Muse)
      - Egalle Muuse
      - Eli Muuse
      - Omar Muuse

== Prominent and Influential figures ==
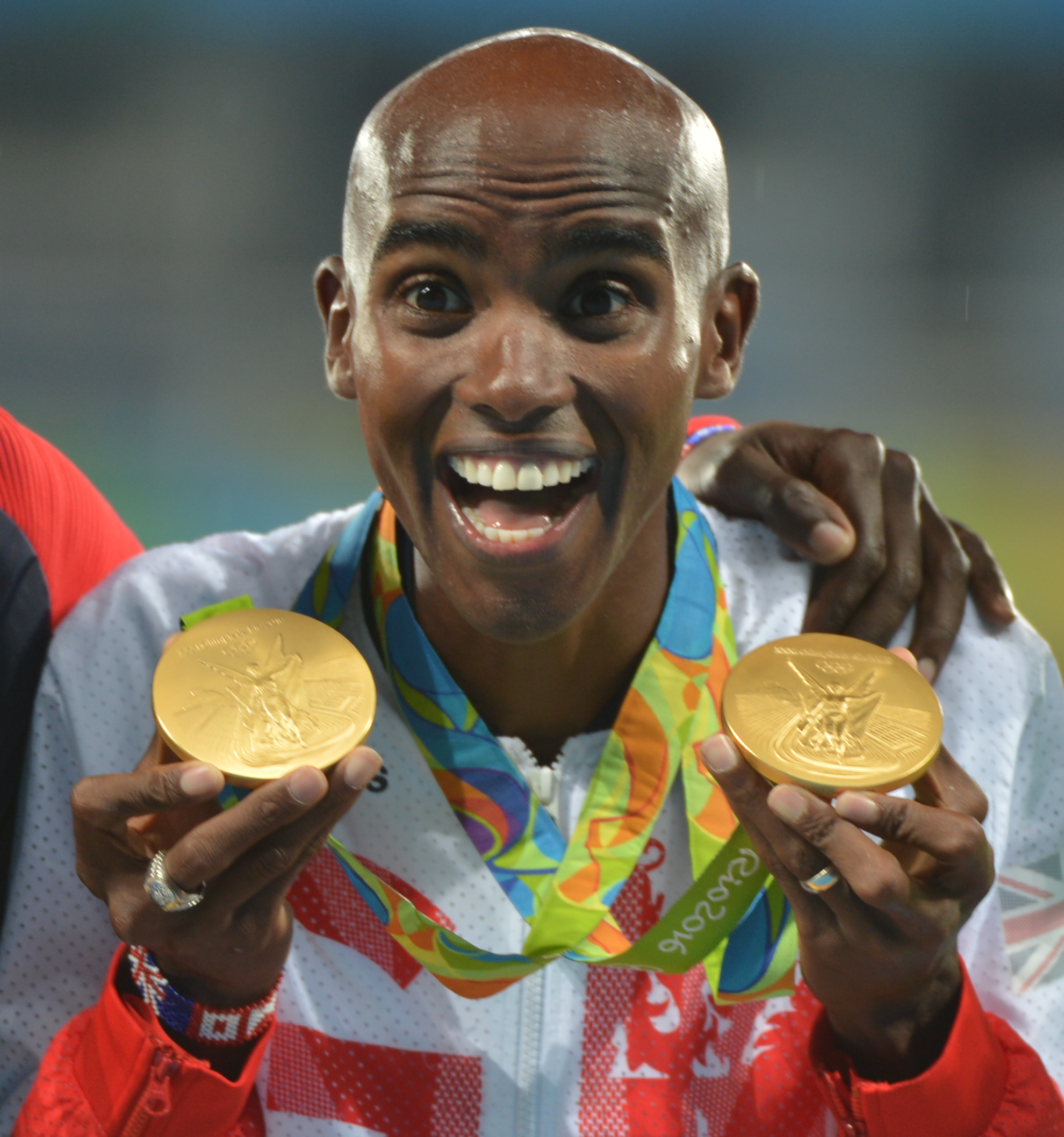
Mo Farah, British four-time Olympic gold medalist and the most decorated athlete in British athletics history.

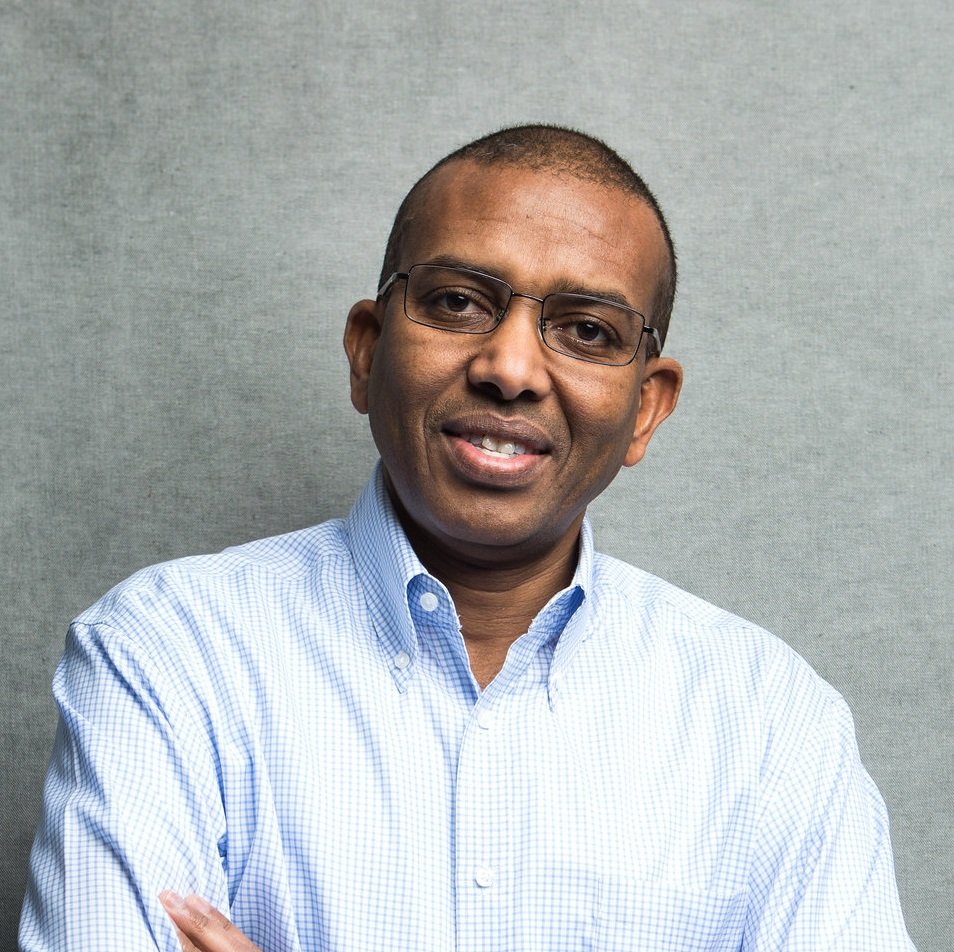
Ismail Ahmed, owner and CEO of WorldRemit which is one of the largest money transfer companies in the world. Considered the 7th most influential man in the United Kingdom.

The clan has produced some of the most prominent and influential Somali figures in history, who are listed below:

- Abdillahi Suldaan Mohammed Timacade, known as "Timacade", a famous poet during the pre- and post-colonial periods
- Suldaan Abdulrahman Gaarad Deria, 1st Sultan & 5th leader of the Habr Awal
- Sheikh Madar Ahmed Shirwac, credited with the early growth of and as the founding father of modern Hargeisa
- Sheikh Ibrahim Sheikh Yusuf Sheikh Madar, served as the elected chairman of the SNM in January 1982 and later served as the Guurti leader in the Somaliland Parliament. He is the grandson of the famous Sheikh Madar.
- Abdulrahim Abby Farah, Under-Secretary-General of the United Nations 1979–1990 and Permanent Representative of Somali Republic to the United Nations 1965–1972.
- Abdurrahman Mahmoud Aidiid, the former Mayor of Hargeisa, the capital of the Republic of Somaliland.
- Abdishakur Iddin, the current Mayor of Berbera, the capital of Sahil Region.
- Abdul Majid Hussein, Economist, Former Permanent Representative of Ethiopia to the United Nations, 2001–2004. Leader of Ethiopian Somali Democratic League (ESDL) party in the Somali Region of Ethiopia from 1995 to 2001.
- Ahmed Mohamed Gulaid, one of the founding members of the Somali National Movement and the first to be elected as the chairman of the organization in October 1981.
- Ahmad Girri bin Husain, Advisor to Ahmad ibn Ibrahim al-Ghazi (Ahmed Guray) and a high ranking Adal Sultanate general who led a large army against the Abyssinian empire.
- Ahmed Hassan Awke, Legendary Somali journalist and broadcaster. He was a veteran of the BBC World Service, the Voice of America, Somaliland National TV, Horn Cable Television, Radio Mogadishu and Universal TV among also being the presidential spokesman of Siad Barre during his Military Junta.
- Ahmed Yusuf Yasin, the Vice-President of Somaliland from 2002 until 2010, and The Second Chairman of UDUB party.
- Ali Abdi Farah, Former Minister of Communication and Culture in Djibouti
- Ali Feiruz, celebrated Somali musician in Djibouti and Somaliland
- Abdi Hashi Abdullahi, Speaker of the Senate of Somalia and Senator since January 2017.
- Gaarriye (born Mohamed Hashi Dhama), Famous poet who composed one of the best known Somali language poems on the theme of reconciliation, "Hagarlaawe" (The Charitable).
- Jaamac Yusuf Tamiinlaaye, mentioned in the Geoffrey Archer's 1916 important members of Darawiish haroun list
- Hussain Bisad, one of the tallest men in the world, at 2.32 m (7 ft 7 1/2 in). He has the largest hand span of anyone alive.
- Ibrahim Dheere, Considered to be the first Somali billionaire and richest Somali person in the world with an estimated net worth of 1.8 billion US Dollars.
- Ismail Ahmed, owner and CEO of WorldRemit which is one of the fastest growing money transfer company in the world and he's considered 7th most influential man in Britain.
- Muhammad Haji Ibrahim Egal, Legendary Somali politician. First Prime Minister of Somalia: 1960, 1967–1969. President of Somaliland, 1993–2002.
- Mohammed Abdillahi Kahin 'Ogsadey', A Somali business tycoon based in Ethiopia, where he established MAO Harar Horse, the first African corporation to export coffee and amassed a net worth of approximately $3 Billion Ethiopian Birr.
- Mohamed Abdullahi Omaar, former Foreign Minister of Somalia
- Mohamed Hasan Abdullahi, former Chief of Staff of Somaliland Armed Forces
- Mo Farah, British four-time Olympic gold medalist and the most decorated athlete in British athletics history. He's also considered to be the best marathon runner in the world.
- Abdi Haybe Laampad Veteran Somali comedian and one of the best Somali comedian of all time.
- Mohamed Omar Arte, former Deputy Prime Minister of Somalia.
- Muhammad Hawadle Madar, former Prime Minister of Somalia from September 3, 1990, to January 24, 1991.
- Muse Bihi Abdi, fifth President of Somaliland and former military officer served as a Somali Air Force pilot.
- Nuh Ismail Tani, current Chief of Staff of Somaliland Armed Forces
- Hussein Mohamed Bashe, is a Tanzanian Minister of Agriculture and Member of Parliament for Nzega Urban constituency since 2015. In January 2022, he was appointed Agriculture Minister.
- Umar Arteh Ghalib, former Prime Minister of Somalia, 1991–1993; brought Somalia into the Arab League in 1974 during his term as Foreign Minister of Somalia, 1969–1977; former president of UN Security Council; teacher and poet
- Dr. Saad Ali Shire, British-Somali politician, agronomist and economist, who is currently serving as the Minister of Finance of Somaliland. Shire formerly served as the Foreign Minister of Somaliland. He also served as the Minister of Planning and National Development of Somaliland.
- Sultan Osman Sultan Ali Koshin, the current Grand sultan of the Issa Musse clans.
- Mohamed se'ad Geedi, The owner of the fastest cable company in the Horn of Africa and MSG Group sa'ad musse
- Jam'a Omar Seed , One of the businessmen of Somaliland and Djibouti with the most economy in terms of importing goods Ominco Company
