= Abdulrahman Deria =

Sultan of Habr Awal (r. 1940s–1970s)

Sultan Abdulrahman Garad Deria سلطان عبد الرحمن جراد ديريه
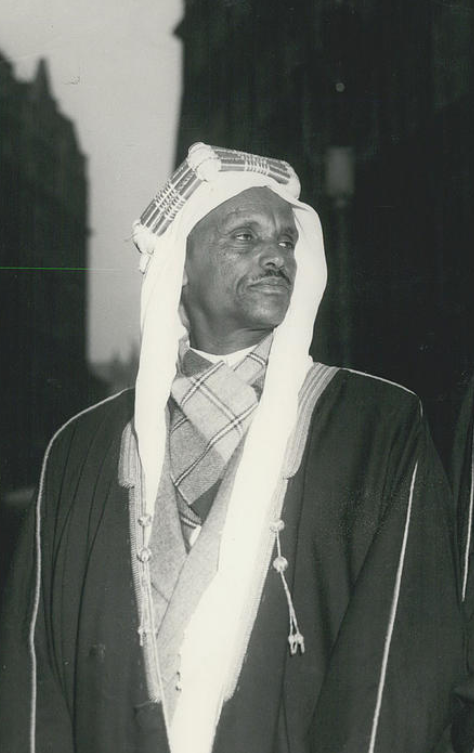
- Abdulrahman Deria in London, 1955

1st Sultan & 5th leader of the Habr Awal
- Reign: 1940s–1970s
- Predecessor: Garaad Deria Abdalla
- Successor: Cabdirizaq Abdulrahman
- Born: 1910
- Died: Early 1970s
- Religion: Sunni Islam

Abdulrahman Garad Deria (Somali: Suldaan Cabdiraxmaan Garaad Diiriye; 1910 – early 1970s) was the Sultan of the Habr Awal Isaaq clan and second Habr Awal leader to adopt the Sultan title rather than Garaad. An influential figure that was heavily involved in advocating for the people of British Somaliland and their rights.

== Background ==
Hailing from the Ahmed Abdalla branch of the Habr Awal Saad Musa, Abdulrahman was crowned Sultan after his father Sultan Dirriye's death. Sultan Abdulrahman was very much like his father filling the role of a peacemaker, however he was much more active in protectorate affairs.

== Isamusa split ==
During his reign the Isamusa would split and crown their own Sultan although continuing to recognize Abdulrahman as their ultimate authority of the Habr Awal. When the Eidagale attempted to raid the Isamusa, a son of the Habr Yunis Sultan joined the raid and when the raiders were pursued he was killed. The Sultan of the Habr Yunis approached Abdulrahman to resolve the dispute and wanted him to compel the Isamusa to pay mag for the Sultan's son. According to traditional Somali xeer restitution is not paid when one is killed in self defense. So the Isamusa refused and banged their shields in disproval of Abdulrahman's judgement.

Cismaan Haariyey a poet stood and recited the following geeraar reaffirming his respect but disagreeing with Sultan Abdulrahman. After this the Issa Musa would leave and go on to crown their first Sultan, Sultan Koshin in 1949 marking their independence from their larger Saad Musa brethren.

Ninka Qaaliya joogee
Ka qoteysta hadhuudhkiyo
Ninka geeri qodaayiyo
Ka qasaalaya geela
Suldaanaw bal qiyaasoo
Wax ma qaybsan karaan?
Suldaanow kuma caayin
Ku canaannana maayo
Ceebna kuu gudi maayo
Calafna kaa sugi maayo
Cuudkii aannu ku siinniyo
Cadradii gabadhiinna
Marnaba kaa celin maayo
Ceynkaagaa rag ahaayoon
Caleentii boqor saarray baa
Cuurkii Muuse Subeer
Aakhiro u celinaaya

— Cismaan Haayirey Suldaanow Kuma Caayin
Translation:

The man who stands in wealth
Who harvests the millet
The man who’s digging for death
And the ones looking after the camels
Oh Suldaan think about it
Can they agree?
Oh Suldaan I have not insulted you
And I am not reprimanding you
I am not compensating you for shame
I expect no wealth from you
The respect we give you
The beautiful young women
We will never take back from you
Men who were like you
Who we put leaves on as king
Are keeping back
The Muuse Subeer people

== Haud Delegation ==
In the year 1955, Sultan Abdulrahman Deria was a member of a 4 delegation team of politicians and Sultans to London, United Kingdom. Their goal was to petition and pressure the British Government in returning lost treaty territory known as the 'Haud Reserve Area' ceded to Ethiopian Empire during the Anglo Ethiopian treaty of 1954.

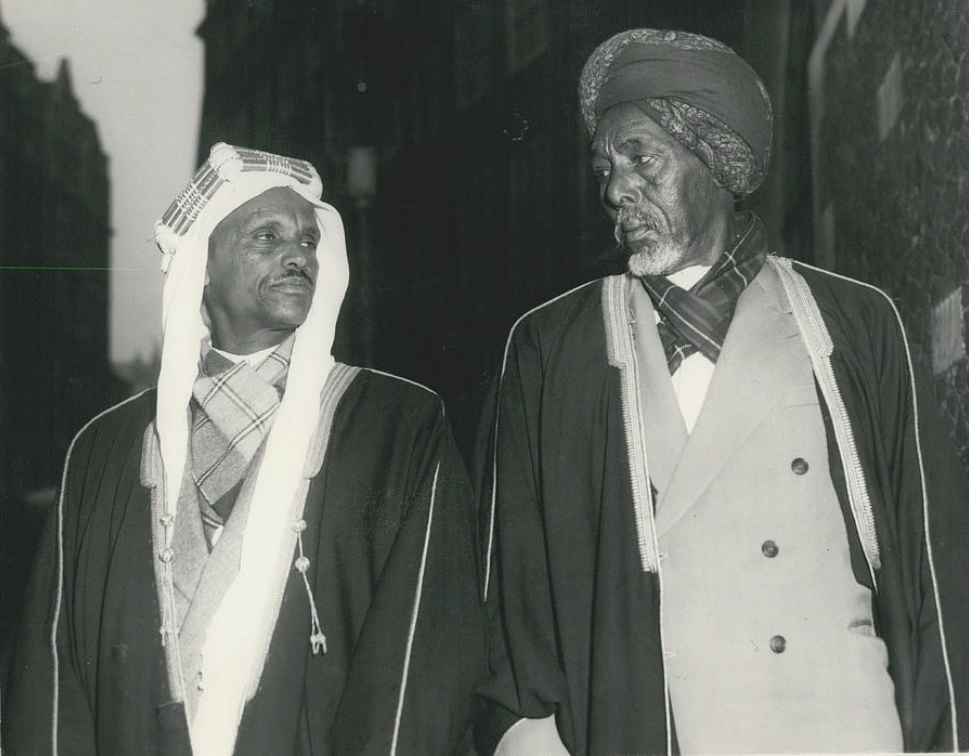
Sultans Abdulrahman Deria and Abdillahi Deria in London, 1955

In Imperial Policies and Nationalism in The Decolonization of Somaliland, 1954-1960, Historian Jama Mohamed writes:

The N.U.F. campaigned for the return of the territories both in Somaliland and abroad. In March 1955, for instance, a delegation consisting of Michael Mariano, Abokor Haji Farah and Abdi Dahir went to Mogadisho to win the support and co-operation of the nationalist groups in Somalia. And in February and May 1955 another delegation consisting of two traditional Sultans (Sultan Abdillahi Sultan Deria, and Sultan Abdulrahman Sultan Deria), and two Western-educated moderate politicians (Michael Mariano, Abdirahman Ali Mohamed Dubeh) visited London and New York. During their tour of London, they formally met and discussed the issue with the Secretary of State for the Colonies, Alan Lennox-Boyd. They told Lennox-Boyd about the 1885 Anglo-Somali treaties. Under the agreements, Michael Mariano stated, the British Government 'undertook never to cede, sell, mortgage or otherwise give for occupation, save to the British Government, any portion of the territory inhabited by them or being under their control'. But now the Somali people 'have heard that their land was being given to Ethiopia under an Anglo-Ethiopian Treaty of 1897'. That treaty, however, was 'in conflict' with the Anglo-Somali treaties 'which took precedence in time' over the 1897 Anglo-Ethiopian Treaty[.] The British Government had 'exceeded its powers when it concluded the 1897 Treaty and ... the 1897 Treaty was not binding on the tribes.' Sultan Abdillahi also added that the 1954 agreement was a 'great shock to the Somali people' since they had not been told about the negotiations, and since the British Government had been administering the area since 1941. The delegates requested, as Sultan Abdulrahman put it, the postponement of the implementation of the agreement to 'grant the delegation time to put up their case' in Parliament and in international organizations.

== Post-independence and death ==
Following the end of British Somaliland and subsequent unification in 1960. Sultan Abdulrahman would later be arrested and targeted by Somali authorities in 1965 alongside other leading Habr Awal figures after being accused of supporting Ethiopian Habr Awals in clan clashes. The SNA was deployed across the border and against sections of the clan, before the Ethiopian Army intervened and repulsed them. There was mass movement by the Habr Awal against this motion and in defense of their Sultan who was eventually released. Abdulrahman would later die in his early 60s and was succeeded by his son Sultan Cabdillahi.

== See also ==
- Somali aristocratic and court titles
- Sultan Abdillahi Deria the Grand Sultan of the Isaaq clan, friend of Sultan Abdulrahman, and fellow member of Haud Delegation
- Habr Awal Abdulrahman's subclan
- Michael Mariano veteran Somali politician and member of the Haud Delegation
- Isaaq
