= Ibrahim Degaweyne =

Somali politician

Ibrahim Dhagaweyne
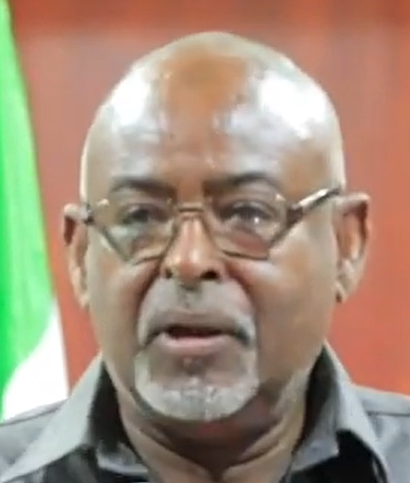
- Political party: Somali National Movement (SNM); Uurka Dimuqraadiyada iyo horumarinta isbedal doonka Somaliland (UDHIS)

Ibrahim Degaweyne (Somali: Ibraahim Cabdilaahi Xuseen (Dhagaweyne), Ibraahin C/laahi Xuseen Dhego Wayne) is a Colonel of Somali National Movement (SNM). H

THey said he have never lost a battle.

Degaweyne confronted the Somaliland government over control of Berbera shortly after Somaliland regained independence. Note that Degaweyne is a nickname and there are several famous people with the same nickname.

== Biography ==
Degaweyne is from the isamusa branch of the Habr Awal clan.

=== Somaliland Independence Movement ===
Degaweyne joined Somali National Movement (SNM)) around 1982. In 1984, Degaweyne was conducting SNM activities based in Sheikh.

On the night of May 31, 1988, at 2:00 a.m., SNM troops, including Muse Bihi Abdi, ibrahim dhegaweyne (leader of SNM troops), Abdirahman Aw Ali Farrah and others entered Hargeisa city.

=== Conflict with the Somaliland government ===
On May 18, 1991, Somaliland regained its independence. Then, the political division "civilian wing" and the military division "Calan Cas (red flag)" within Somaliland confronted each other. Degaweyne was one of the leading commanders of Calan Cas.

In April 1992, the armies of Habr Awal clan and Habr Je'lo clan fought in Berbera; Habr Awal's army, led by Degaweyne, expelled Habr Je'lo from Berbera. President Tuur asked the Sa'ad Musa clan for reinforcements, but the Sa'ad Musa refused. President Tuur therefore dispatched his own Habar Yoonis. However, this was interpreted as an invasion of Berbera by the Habar Yoonis, rather than a restoration of security by the government. Degaweyne temporarily withdrew from Berbera, but in August 1992, there was a conflict within the Habar Yoonis, and Degaweyne took the opportunity to occupy Berbera and then launched an invasion toward Hargeisa. This led to a deterioration of security in Hargeisa and other parts of Somaliland. This series of battles was one of the major causes for the resignation of President Tuur. Thereafter, the conflict between Habr Awal and the government over control of Berbera continued.

=== ASAD Party ===
In May 1993, the Grand Conference of National Reconciliation took place, Somaliland became a peaceful regime, and politics became electoral. The first elections were held in 2002 (2002 Somaliland municipal elections). This made it necessary for groups in Somaliland to form political parties. In September 2001, Suleiman Mohamoud Adan formed a political group called Alliance for Salvation and Democracy (ASAD); Calan Cas, to which Degaweyne belongs, supported ASAD. However, ASAD was defeated in the 2002 elections

=== UDHIS Party ===
In February 2009, a political party called Uurka Dimuqraadiyada iyo horumarinta isbedal doonka Somaliland (The birth of democracy and the development of change in Somaliland, UDHIS) Degaweyne also joined the party as an executive member. However, according to the law, there can be no more than three political parties in Somaliland, and at this time Kulmiye, UDUB, and UCID were chosen; UDHIS was not among the three, and UDHIS announced its opinion that this system was inappropriate.

In November 2011, there was a move to unify UCID and UDHIS. However, this did not happen. On December 29, 2011, 15 parties applied for registration and UDHIS was one of them. However, in April 2012, the Somaliland Political Party Recognition Committee announced that only six groups would be recognized and that nine groups, including UDHIS, did not meet the party requirements. The reason given was that UDHIS has no base in Sanaag and Sool and has less than 1,000 supporters in Togdheer and Sanaag. Degaweyne protested this decision.

In May 2012, Degaweyne again expressed criticism of the government's policy.

In September 2012, UDHIS announced its merger with NASIYE.

=== Thereafter ===
In May 2013, Degaweyne announced that Somaliland is an inalienable territory at a celebration of Somaliland's independence.

In October 2013, Degaweyne criticized the Somaliland government's treatment of Berbera.

In December 2013, Degaweyne expressed support for the UCID party, which criticizes the current government.

In 2016, Degaweyne was honored by the chief of Sa'ad Musa along with Ahmed Mire Mahamed and Mohamed Hasan Abdullahi.

In July 2019, Degaweyn criticized the Somaliland government for initiating negotiations with Somalia despite Somalia's failure to recognize the atrocities committed against Somaliland in 1988.

In 2019, Degaweyne visited Burao with Hassan Guure and others to resolve the clan conflict.

In February 2020, Degaweyne expressed strong opposition when it was announced that the Somalia president was planning to visit Somaliland.

In October 2020, Degaweyne visited the presidential palace for the first time since Somaliland gained independence in 1991.
