= WorldRemit =

Global cross-border payments company

WorldRemit Limited
- Type: Subsidiary
- Industry: Financial services
- Founded: 2010; 16 years ago
- Founder: Ismail Ahmed; Richard Igoe; Catherine Wines
- Headquarters: London, United Kingdom
- Key people: Mark Lenhard (CEO); Ismail Ahmed (Non-executive chairman)
- Number of employees: 848 (2021)
- Parent: Zepz
- Website: worldremit.com

WorldRemit is a digital cross border remittance business that provides international money transfer and remittance services in more than 130 countries and over 70 currencies. It was founded in 2010 by Ismail Ahmed, Catherine Wines, and Richard Igoe. It is owned by Zepz, which also owns Sendwave.

== History ==
WorldRemit was founded in 2010 by Ismail Ahmed, a former compliance advisor to the United Nations Development Programme, Catherine Wines and Richard Igoe. In October 2018, the company announced that they would be bringing in Breon Corcoran as CEO. In 2021, WorldRemit acquired Sendwave, another cross-border digital payments company. Zepz was created as the group business housing both the WorldRemit and SendWave brands and businesses. Breon Corcoran left the organization in August 2022, when Mark Lenhard, former COO of Bill.com, was appointed Group CEO of Zepz.

In 2025, AUSTRAC, the Australian financial intelligence agency, performed a spot check of 15 online payment platforms and identified deficient monitoring and reporting practices related to suspicious transactions for child sexual abuse material. WorldRemit was found to have the most concerning practices among the businesses investigated and was ordered to appoint an external auditor.

== Operations ==
WorldRemit focuses on cross border remittance money transfers from over 50 countries to over 130 countries around the world. For those receiving money, it offers pay out options including bank deposit, mobile money, mobile airtime top-up and cash pick-up as well as cash delivery.

The firm has a network of more than 5,000 corridors. It is connected to mobile money services globally, including Zaad (Somaliland/Northern Somalia), M-Pesa (Kenya), MTN (Africa and Asia), and bKash (Bangladesh). As of October 2019, it can send funds to 115 different countries; this includes all African countries except for Sudan, South Sudan, Eswatini, Eritrea, Libya, and Algeria.

== Funding ==
WorldRemit is backed by venture capital companies Accel and Technology Crossover Ventures (TCV).

In February 2015, the firm announced a $100m Series B funding round led by TCV. It was also announced that TCV General Partner John Rosenberg would join its board.

In 2017, the firm received $40 million in their Series C round of funding, with LeapFrog Investments as the lead investor. In 2019, it raised a $175 million Series D funding round, led by TCV, Accel, and Leapfrog Investments.

== Sanctions for illegal practices with Sendwave app ==
In 2023 the Consumer Financial Protection Bureau found that Chime Inc, a WorldRemit subsidiary which operates Sendwave, had violated the Electronic Fund Transfer Act and the CFPB Remittance Transfer Rule. Some of the specific violations were:

- The Sendwave user agreement illegally waived consumer's legal protections regarding liability for losses incurred using the app.
- The speed and cost of transfers were misrepresented. The company promised transfers would happen in seconds, but often took much longer. Transfers to Nigeria were not free as promised.
- Sendwave failed to disclose correct exchange rates or funds availability.
- Sendwave did not have policies and procedures to track and investigate remittance transfer errors, it did not properly investigate errors when it was notified.
- Sendwave sometimes did not provide receipts within the time frame required by the Remittance Transfer Rule.

In its consent decree Chime was ordered to pay $1.5 million in refunds, fined $1.5 million, and it agreed to change its practices.
