= Hussain Bisad =

World's biggest hands, world's second-tallest man

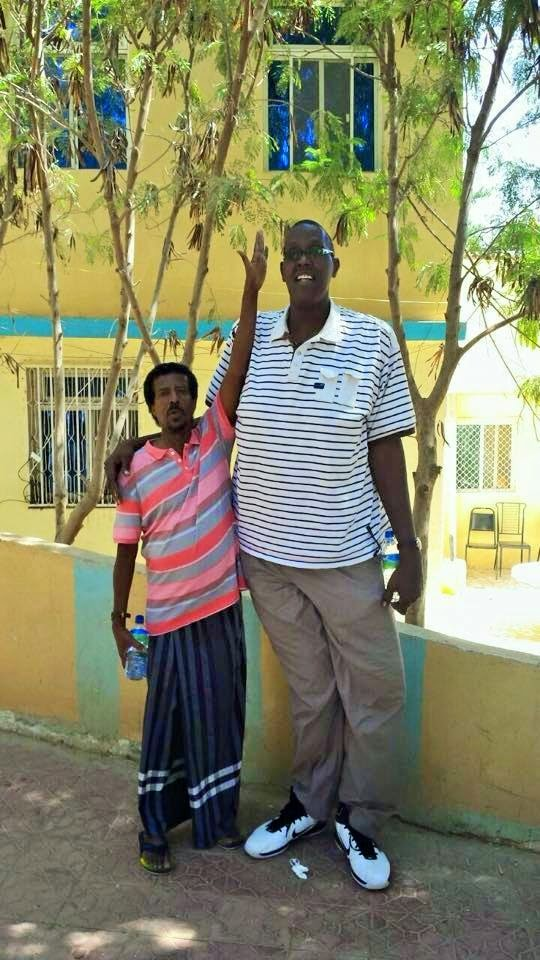
- Bisad pictured with late veteran Somali journalist Ahmed Hassan Awke
- Born: 1975 (age 50–51); Burao, Somaliland
- Known for: Former tallest living man
- Height: 2.32 m (7 ft 7 2/7 in)
- Spouse: Yasmin Hasan Muhumed (m. 2015)

Hussain Mahamed Ahmed, more commonly known as Hussain Bisad (born 1975) (Somali: Xuseen Maxamed Axmed (Xuseen Bisad)) is one of the tallest people in the world and the tallest known person in the UK, at 2.32 m (7 ft 7 1/2 in). He held the record for the largest hands of anyone alive until Sultan Kosen took the record. His hands are 10.59 inches or 26.9 cm long. He weighs 210 kg (460 lb). Doctors believe that Bisad has a condition called pituitary giantism, that makes growth continue after most people stop developing. Expert in abnormal growth Professor Mike Besser, from Bart's Hospital, Central London, said he probably has a tumour in the pituitary gland behind his eyes.

Hussain Bisad is originally from Somaliland, and he hails from the Issa Musa sub-division of the Habr Awal Isaaq clan. He fled Somali Republic after being shot by Somali Republic government forces during the Somalis rebellion, and has been granted asylum in Britain, where he now lives.

== Personal life ==
Hussain was born in 1975 in Burao, the capital of the Togdheer region in Somalia. In 2015 he married Yasmin Hasan Muhumed at a wedding ceremony in Hargeisa, attended by Somalia officials like Mohamed Kahin Ahmed, as well as the shortest living man in Somalia.

Due to severe health complications leading to needing dialysis multiple times a day, he moved into a care home in Brent. He has since received a kidney transplant and is recovering well.

== See also ==
- Giantism
- List of tallest people
