= Ibrahim Dheere =

- Ibraahim Cabdi Kaahin
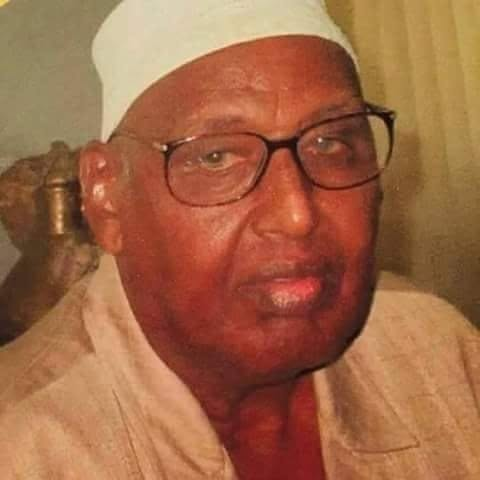
- Born: ca. 1920; British Somaliland
- Died: 12 Novemter 2015; Djibouti
- Occupation: Businessperson

Ibrahim Abdi Kahin (Somali: Ibraahim Cabdi Kaahin, ca.1920 - 12 Novemter 2015), known as Ibrahim Dheere (Somali: Ibraahim Dheere) was a businessperson, who is one of the wealthiest people among the Somali people. He made his fortune in Djibouti and later moved to Somaliland. "Dheere" is his nickname, which means "tall person."

== Biography ==
Dheere was born in the British Somaliland around 1920. He belongs to Habr Awal, Isaaq clan.

In the early 1980s, he started a trading business, focusing primarily on food import and distribution.

Due to the Somali Civil War from 1991, all ports within Somalia include Somaliland had been closed due to sanctions. Ibrahim Dhere attempted to sail a ship loaded with food to the Port of Berbera, but since the insurance company refused to provide coverage, he paid the security deposit himself to proceed with the voyage. Because the ship's captain confirmed that the Port of Berbera was peaceful, the sanctions against the port were subsequently lifted.

At the 1993 Borama Conference, Muhammad Egal, a member of the Habr Awal clan, was elected president of Somaliland. Egal received substantial funds from Habr Awal merchants, and among them, the amount provided by Dheere was by far the largest. In return, Egal offered generous tax exemptions on their cargo transported via the Port of Berbera.

Egal established the 1st Brigade of the Somaliland Armed Forces. Dhere provided funds to purchase three months' worth of food for the Brigade. Furthermore, when the Armed Forces' 2nd Brigade was established, a large amount of funding was required, in response to the government's request, he paid 10 years' worth of rent for the state-owned warehouse in advance. In addition, approximately 1.1 million U.S. dollars were needed to print the new Somaliland shilling and for other related expenses; while funds were raised from several businesspeople, Dhere provided nearly 400,000 U.S. dollars to cover the shortfall. Furthermore, when the banknote was introduced, he contributed collateral funds (estimated at 2 million U.S. dollars.)

Habr Awal business leaders such as Ibrahim Dhere and Jama Omar moved their operations from Djibouti to Somaliland. At that time, high duties were imposed on livestock exports, so they mainly imported daily necessities from Thailand and made substantial profits by bartering them for livestock in the interior.

In 2004, his daughter, Hasna Ibrahim Abdi, founded "IAK Real Estate & Investment" in Hargeisa. IAK refers to the initials of Ibrahim Abdi Kahin.

Dheere's net worth was estimated at 1.6 billion U.S. dollars, and he was said to be the wealthiest person in the Somali community.

=== Death ===
In November 2015, he died while hospitalized at one of Djibouti's largest hospitals. He was nearly 100 years old when he died.

In response to his death, Somaliland President Silanyo expressed his condolences.
