= Da'ar buduq =

Daarbuduq Dacar Budhuq
- Town
- Location in Somaliland Daarbuduq (Somaliland)
- Coordinates: 9°51′24″N 44°31′38″E
- Country: Somaliland
- Region: Maroodi-Jeex
- District: Hargeisa
- Time zone: UTC+3 (EAT)

Daar Buduq (Somali: Dacarbudhuq) is a town in the Marodi Jeh province of Somaliland. Situated in the Hargeisa District, it is located northeast by road from Hargeisa and southwest of Berbera.

The town is inhabited by people from the Adam Issa and Abokor Issa subdivisions of the Isamusa clans. It is to the west of the hills of Adadleh.

== See also ==
- Administrative divisions of Somaliland
- Regions of Somaliland
- Districts of Somaliland
