= Hargeisa District =

Coordinates: 9.5625°N 44.0697°E

Hargeisa District Degmada Hargeysa
- District
- Location of Hargeisa City, Maroodi Jeex, Somaliland
- Country: Somaliland
- Region: Maroodi Jeex

Population (2005)
  - Total: 1,560,028
- Time zone: UTC+3 (EAT)

Hargeisa District (Somali: Degmada Hargeysa) is an Administrative District in the Maroodi Jeex region of Somaliland. Its capital lies at Hargeisa. Other settlements in the district include Daarbuduq.

== See also ==
- Administrative divisions of Somaliland
- Regions of Somaliland
- Districts of Somaliland
