= Abdulrahim Abby Farah =

Welsh-born Somali diplomat and politician

The Honourable Abdulrahim Abby Farah عبدالرحيم عابي فارح

Undersecretary General of for Special Political Questions of the United Nations
- In office 1979–1990

Assistant Secretary-General for Special Political Questions of the United Nations
- In office 1973–1978

Permanent Representative of Somalia to the United Nations
- In office 1965–1972
- Prime Minister: Abdirizak Haji Hussein

Ambassador of Somalia to Ethiopia
- In office 1961–1965
- Prime Minister: Abdirashid Ali Sharmarke

Personal details
- Born: 22 October 1919 Barry, Wales
- Died: 14 May 2018 (aged 98) New York, U.S.
- Party: Somali Youth League
- Education: University College, Exeter; Oxford University

Abdulrahim Abby Farah (Somali: Cabdiraxiim Caabbi Faarax, Arabic: عبد الرحيم آبي فرح; 22 October 1919 – 14 May 2018) was a Welsh-born Somali diplomat and politician. He was Assistant Secretary-General for Special Political Questions 1973-1978 and Deputy Secretary General of the United Nations 1979-1990. He served as the Permanent Representative of Somalia to the United Nations, and as the Ambassador of Somalia to Ethiopia. He was the Chairperson of the PaSAGO non-governmental organization. He hailed from the Mohamed Isa subdivision of the Isa Musa subclan of the Isaaq Somali.

== Personal life ==
Farah was born on 22 October 1919, in Barry, Wales, and came from the Isa Musa subclan of the Isaaq. His father Abby Farah, was a Somali entrepreneur and sailor, who was awarded an MBE for his community service to sailors in war time. His mother, Hilda Anderson, ran a boarding house. Racial tensions in South East Wales were high at the time, following on from the Cardiff Race Riots in June 1919.

Farah grew up in Barry, attending Gladstone Road School, and Barry Grammar School.

He earned degrees from the University College, Exeter and Balliol College, Oxford University in England. His two brothers also studied at Oxford.

Farah was married four times, and divorced twice. He met his third wife Sheila Farrell, a history teacher and speechwriter (d. 1997) at Oxford. He married his fourth wife, Hodan Goth in 2001 and had seven children in total.

== Career ==
Farah began his diplomatic career with the British Somaliland administration (today Somaliland), sent there age 17 by his father. After independence, he served with the early civilian government of the Somali Republic in various capacities from 1951 to 1961, including as Director of the Somali Information Service.

Between 1961 and 1965, Farah was Somalia's Ambassador to Ethiopia. He acted as Somalia's representative to the United Nations Economic Commission for Africa (ECA) in 1962. Ambassador Farah also represented the nation at Council of Ministers meetings of the Organisation of African Unity (OAU) in 1964 and 1965.

From 1965 to 1972, Farah was the Permanent Representative of Somalia to the United Nations in New York City. He concurrently served as the Acting Director General of Somalia's Ministry of Foreign Affairs in 1966.

From 1969 to 1972, Farah was the Chairperson of the UN Special Committee Against Apartheid, presiding over a special session of the United Nations Security Council with Umar Ateh Galib in 1972. He acted as the Assistant Secretary-General for Special Political Questions between 1973 and 1978. Additionally, Farah served as Somalia's representative within the League of Arab States.

From 1973 to 1978, he was the Undersecretary-General for Special Political Questions, later becoming the Undersecretary General from 1979 to 1990. In 1990, Farah headed the UN Mission on ‘Progress made on the Declaration on Apartheid and its Destructive Consequences on South Africa’.

In 1998, Farah helped found the Partnership to Strengthen African Grassroots Organizations (PaSAGO). He later served as the non-governmental organization's Chairperson. Farah died in May 2018 at the age of 98. He maintained his Welsh accent throughout his life.

== See also ==
- Omar Arte Ghalib
- Muhammad Haji Ibrahim Egal
- Aden Adde
- Nelson Mandela
- Abdirashid Shermarke
- Issa Musse
- Habr Awal
