= Michael Mariano =

Somali politician and businessman

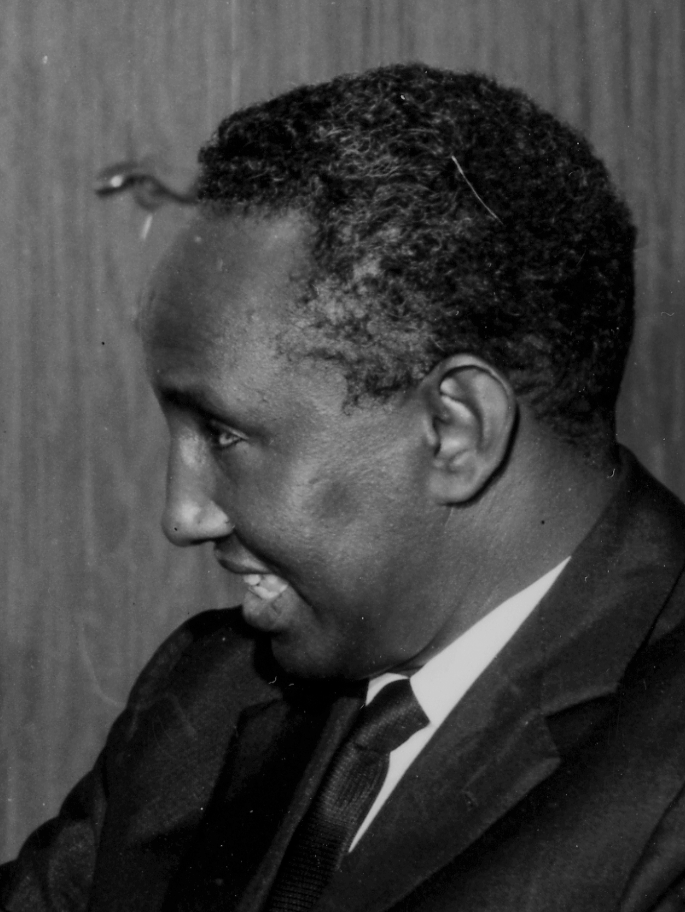
- Mariano in 1962

Secretary General of the National United Front (NUF)
- In office 1955–1960

Minister of Planning
- In office July 6, 1967 – 21, October, 1969

Ambassador to Zambia
- In office 1974–1986

Personal details
- Born: 1914 Berbera, British Somaliland (now Somaliland)
- Died: 1987 Mogadishu, Somalia
- Party: Somali Youth League; Somali National League; National United Front
- Spouse: Francois Farah Siyad
- Children: Norine, Catherine, Robleh, Derie, Rasheed, Adan, Luula, Dhol

Michael Mariano (Somali: Maykal Maryaano) (1914-1987) was a Somali politician and businessman best remembered for leading a delegation to UN Headquarters in New York City and advocating for the return of the Somali inhabited Haud reserved area to Somali administration from the Ethiopian Empire. A notable member of the Somali Youth League, Mariano was fluent in Somali, Arabic and English.

== Biography ==
=== Early life ===
Michael was born in Berbera, British Somaliland in 1914 into the Uduruxmiin sub-division of the Habr Je'lo Isaaq clan. He soon lost his father at an early age. His mother moved to Aden and Mariano was raised by a Catholic mission in Aden Colony. He would go onto join the civil service in British Somaliland and form a men's political club in Burao by 1936.

=== Advocacy in British Somaliland Protectorate and Ethiopia ===
Mariano would emerge on the big stage after his successful business enterprise in Dire Dawa. Meeting Somali Youth League leaders, his expertise was sought out and Michael would join the party in 1947 and come to draft many of the key documents the SYL used to communicate with the British Somaliland and Trust Territory of Somaliland authorities. His advocacy and position angered Ethiopian authorities who would eventually arrest Michael and his family. After feigning a divorce, Ethiopian authorities let him free but he was not allowed to return to the city. In touch with many other anti colonial figure such as the renowned Sheikh Bashir (who once came to Mariano's home and demanded to know why he was assisting Somalis with their English-language learning in order to prepare for the yearly civil service exam), Mariano's aptitude and great speaking ability brought him centre stage in the Haud dispute.

=== Haud Reserve Area ===
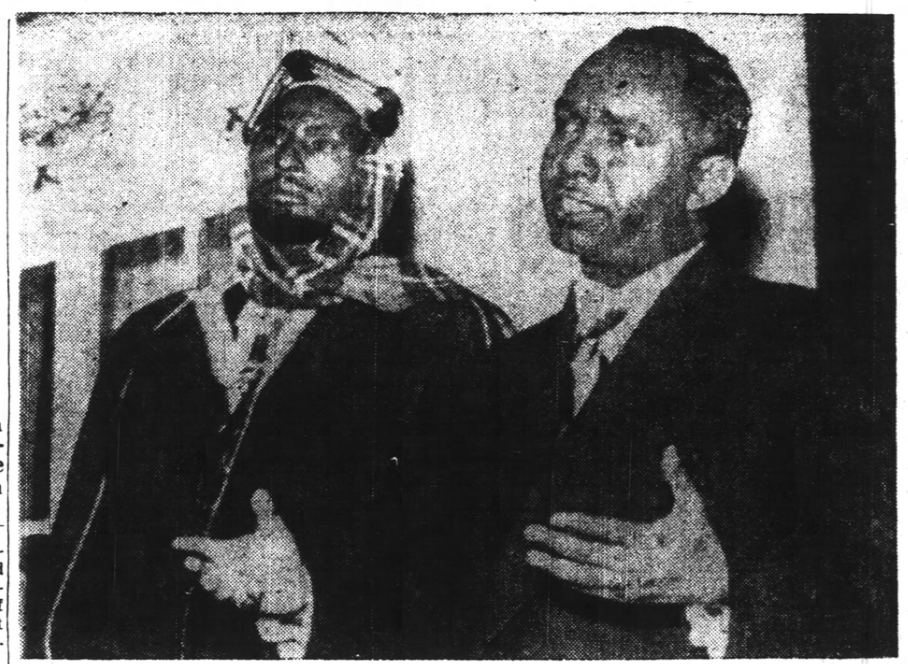
Michael Mariano (right) with Sultan Bihi Mumin from the Ogaden Clan at the 2nd Delegation in New York 1955

==== London Delegation ====
In the year 1955, Mariano was a member of a 4 delegation team of politicians and Sultans to London, United Kingdom. Their goal was to petition and pressure the British Government in returning lost treaty territory known as the 'Haud Reserve Area' ceded to Ethiopian Empire during the Anglo Ethiopian treaty of 1954. The National United Front was a division of the Somali National League that was specially tasked for this purpose and Mariano a founding figure was nominated as vice president of the party.

In Imperial Policies and Nationalism in The Decolonization of Somaliland, 1954-1960, Historian Jama Mohamed writes:

The N.U.F. campaigned for the return of the territories both in Somaliland and abroad. In March 1955, for instance, a delegation consisting of Michael Mariano, Abokor Haji Farah and Abdi Dahir went to Mogadisho to win the support and co-operation of the nationalist groups in Somalia. And in February and May 1955 another delegation consisting of two traditional Sultans (Sultan Abdillahi Sultan Deria, and Sultan Abdulrahman Sultan Deria), and two Western-educated moderate politicians (Michael Mariano, Abdirahman Ali Mohamed Dubeh) visited London and New York. During their tour of London, they formally met and discussed the issue with the Secretary of State for the Colonies, Alan Lennox-Boyd. They told Lennox-Boyd about the 1885 Anglo-Somali treaties. Under the agreements, Michael Mariano stated, the British Government 'undertook never to cede, sell, mortgage or otherwise give for occupation, save to the British Government, any portion of the territory inhabited by them or being under their control'. But now the Somali people 'have heard that their land was being given to Ethiopia under an Anglo-Ethiopian Treaty of 1897'. That treaty, however, was 'in conflict' with the Anglo-Somali treaties 'which took precedence in time' over the 1897 Anglo-Ethiopian Treaty[.] The British Government had 'exceeded its powers when it concluded the 1897 Treaty and ... the 1897 Treaty was not binding on the tribes.' Sultan Abdillahi also added that the 1954 agreement was a 'great shock to the Somali people' since they had not been told about the negotiations, and since the British Government had been administering the area since 1941. The delegates requested, as Sultan Abdulrahman put it, the postponement of the implementation of the agreement to 'grant the delegation time to put up their case' in Parliament and in international organizations.

==== New York Delegation ====
During the same year, Mariano led a 2nd delegation this time United Nations in New York City. The issue was that the British government had clearly violated the treaties it signed with Somali clans when it unjustly handed over their territory to Ethiopia in the Anglo-Ethiopian Treaty of 1897

=== Independence and Somali Republic ===
Mariano was a strong campaigner for independence and he was a member of the British Somaliland Protectorate advisory committee which worked extensively to prepare Somaliland for independence from the United Kingdom. Alongside other active members of the protectorate such as Muhammad Haji Ibrahim Egal and Sultan Abdillahi Deria they oversaw independence on June 26, 1960.Republic Somaliland would unify with Italian trust territory Somalia on July 1, 1960, to form the Somali Republic. Mariano won a seat in Erigavo part of Burao District and served as MP in the Somali Parliament.

==== Somali Kenyan Liberation ====
The NFD (Northern Frontier District of Kenya) is an exclusive Somali inhabited territory within Kenya now encompassing Wajir County, Garissa County and Mandera County. From 1960 to 1967 the Somali Republic pushed and supported Somali efforts to unify ethnic Somali territory with Somalia proper. Mariano himself held a radio program on Radio Mogadishu called 'Needs of the Somali People' and in 1962 gave advice regarding the situation of the NFD. He was one of the leading figures in the intellectual war against Kenya while Shifta fighters fought the Kenyan military. This is part of his broadcast statement on October 26, 1962.

The cry "Let us secede from Kenya and have union with the Somali Republic" is indeed clear. It means what it says and that is that. But if there are demands such as "Let us secede from Kenya but be under separate temporary rule," This can result in a reply like "We cannot rule you separately and temporarily and it is better for you to be tied to Kenya as before." This is the worst thing and can bring discontent. The best thing for the people to do is to make their position very clear, that is, a) to secede from Kenya and b) to unite with their brothers in the Somali Republic. All Somalis support you in this. They support you in what you have decided and what you will decide. We shall work with you. We are beside you, shoulder to shoulder. The whole of Africa wants uhuru (freedom) and you want your share of it. That share, then, is to have it with your brother Somalis

Mariano and Abdullahi Issa also justified the Somali Republic's decision to sever diplomatic ties with the United Kingdom over its support for Kenya in the NFD dispute. Giving an interview to explain the government's position and feelings of the Somali people.

==== Later life ====
After Egal became the 3rd Prime Minister of Somalia in 1967 he nominated Mariano to the Minister of Planning. He held this post until the 1969 coup and was imprisoned alongside the rest of the government by the new President Siad Barre. Mariano was released with the rest of the cabinet minus Egal in 1974 and he would go on to become Ambassador to Zambia. President Barre requested his aid in writing documents justifying Somalia's territorial claims in the Ogaden War and Mariano's past expertise with the Somali Youth League was greatly beneficial. Following the war Mariano would return to life as a businessman but this time starting operations in Mogadishu. Mariano and his family converted to Islam which was jubilantly received nationwide from Mogadishu to Hargeisa. Suffering from blood cancer he retired from public service in 1986 before finally dying in 1987, Michael received a state funeral in Mogadishu.

== See also ==
- Muhammad Haji Ibrahim Egal
- Aden Adde
- Abdirashid Shermarke
- Isaaq
- Habr Je'lo
- Sultan Abdillahi Deria
- Sultan Abdulrahman Deria
