= Ismail Ahmed (businessman) =

Somali-British entrepreneur

Ismail Ibrahim Ahmed
- Ismaaciil Ibraahin Axmed
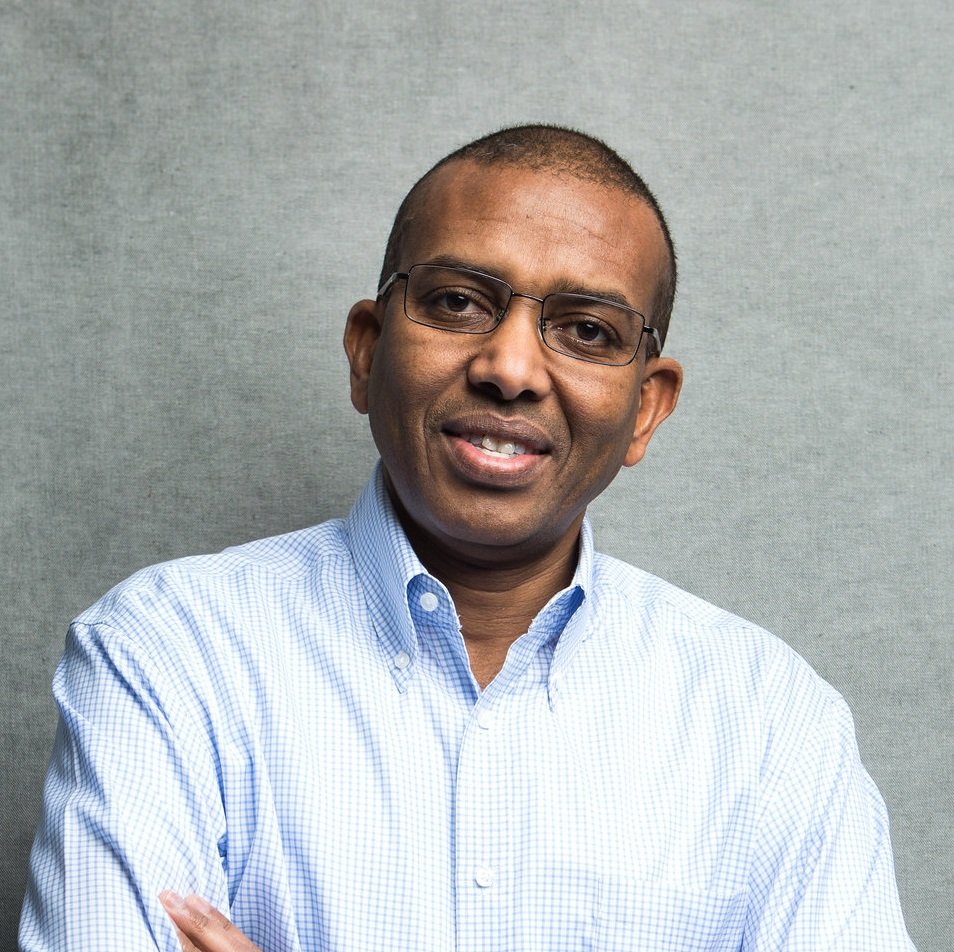
- Ahmed in 2015
- Born: May 1960 (age 65–66); Hargeisa, British Somaliland (now Somaliland)
- Education: London Business School
- Known for: Founder and chairman of WorldRemit

Ismail Ibrahim Ahmed (Somali: Ismaciil Axmed, Arabic: إسماعيل أحمد) is a Somali-British entrepreneur and the founder and chairman of WorldRemit, a money transfer company, and director of the Sahan Foundation International.

== Early life and education ==
Ahmed was born and raised in Somaliland, where he grew up in the city of Hargeisa. Before the outbreak of the Somali Civil War, Ahmed was awarded a World Bank scholarship to study economics in the UK at the University of London. After the outbreak of war, with the help of his family Ahmed was smuggled out of Somaliland to reach the United Kingdom as a refugee.

Ahmed has a PhD in economics from the University of London and an MBA from London Business School.

== Interest in financial transactions ==
While studying in the UK, Ahmed worked in a number of part-time jobs, including strawberry-picking in Kent, and sent money home to family in Somaliland. The act of sending money home was important to him, following the tradition of other family members who worked abroad that did the same to support those in need back home in Somaliland. However the financial and time costs of conducting transactions to send money home began to get prohibitive, which prompted Ahmed to begin thinking if there was a "better way to do this".

Ahmed worked for a World Bank agricultural development project in Hargeisa, Somaliland, before moving on to work for the United Nations Development Programme (UNDP), where he helped run a money transfer project. He went to his boss with allegations of corruption he had uncovered in its Somalia programme, "My boss said if I went and submitted the dossier, I would never be able to work in remittances again, and I took that threat very seriously. I lost my job to uncover the fraud." He was later found to have been unfairly treated by the UNDP and awarded compensation of £200,000.

== Creating a money transfer business ==
Ahmed eventually began developing the idea of creating a mobile money transfer system which would undercut the higher costs of similar services from banks and traditional money transfer systems. He launched WorldRemit in 2010. By moving the transactions to mobiles, it created an opportunity for many people in the world that don't have bank accounts but may at least have access to a mobile phone.

In October 2020, Ahmed was named first in the Powerlist 2020, an annual list of the 100 most powerful people of African heritage in the UK. The following year, his company launched the Top 10 Most Influential Africans in the Diaspora list, in order to explore and celebrate the contributions of African immigrants to the USA.
