= Sendwave =

Financial technology company

- Type: Subsidiary
- Industry: Financial services, Fintech, Remittances
- Founded: 2014
- Founder: Drew Durbin, Lincoln Quirk
- Headquarters: Delaware, United States
- Key people: Mark Lenhard (CEO, Zepz)
- Services: International money transfers
- Parent: Zepz
- Website: https://www.sendwave.com

Sendwave is a mobile-first remittance company that specializes in enabling instant money transfers from North America, Europe, and Asia to mobile wallets and bank accounts in Africa, Asia, and other emerging markets. Sendwave operates as a separate brand under Zepz, formerly WorldRemit Group, following an acquisition in 2021.

== History ==
Sendwave was founded in 2014 and was owned by Chime Inc. to facilitate remittances to African countries, starting with Kenya and Ghana. The company emphasized direct transfers to mobile money wallets, reflecting the growing adoption of mobile financial services in Africa.

The first Sendwave markets outside of Africa launched in 2020, targeting South Asian countries such as Bangladesh and Sri Lanka.

In February 2021, WorldRemit Group, later renamed Zepz, acquired Sendwave for approximately $500 million, but continues to operate independently under its own brand and mobile app. In 2022, Sendwave entered the Lebanese market, offering users the ability to send low-cost, instant money transfers to Lebanon. In June 2023, Sendwave announced the launch of its services in Mexico, enabling users to send low-cost remittances to the country. In November 2023, Sendwave entered the Moroccan market through a partnership with Chaabi Cash, a subsidiary of Banque Centrale Populaire (BCP Group). In January 2024, Chime Inc. merged with WorldRemit Corp., but Sendwave continues to operate as an independent brand.

On October 7, 2024, Zepz raised $267 million in a Series F funding round led by Accel, LeapFrog Investments, TCV, and the International Finance Corporation to expand its global cross-border remittance services, including Sendwave and WorldRemit.

On April 3, 2025, Zepz secured $165 million in growth financing led by HSBC Innovation Banking UK and HSBC Private Credit. The package includes a $110 million revolving credit facility and a $55 million term loan to support expansion of its WorldRemit and Sendwave remittance services.

== Activities ==
Sendwave offers low-cost and near-instantaneous money transfer services, primarily targeting markets with high demand for remittances to mobile wallets and bank accounts. The company operates a network of over 185 partners globally, including fintech companies, banks, cash payout agents, and telecommunications providers.

Sendwave lets customers fund transfers via debit card or bank transfer through its mobile app or website, then delivers funds instantly or within hours via bank deposit, mobile wallet, cash pickup, or airtime top-up. It operates digitally across over 200 corridors in more than 100 countries, partnering with local banks and mobile operators to offer competitive exchange rates and low or no fees on many routes.

Sendwave users download the app, verify their identity, and link a debit/credit card or bank account. They then enter the recipient’s country, amount, and beneficiary details, and funds arrive instantly or within hours via bank deposit, mobile wallet, cash pickup, or airtime top-up.

Sendwave’s largest recipient markets include Kenya, Nigeria, Ghana, Uganda, Liberia, Tanzania, and Bangladesh.
