= Abdi Haybe Lambad =

Somali actor

- Born: Abdi Haibe; Hargeisa

Abdi Haybe Lambad (Somali: Cabdi Haybe Laambad) is a veteran Somali comedian actor and one of the most noted comedians in Somali cinema history. Lambad was one of the first Somali stand-up comedians in the Horn of Africa. He currently resides in Sweden. He hails from the Abokor Isa subdivisions of the Isamusa subclan of the Isaaq.
