= Sultan Osman Sultan Ali Koshin =

The Honourable Sultan Osman Sultan Ali Koshin

Sultanate
- Preceded by: Sultan Ali Koshin
- Succeeded by: Sultan Ali Osman

Personal details
- Born: Berbera

Sultan Osman Sultan Ali Koshin (Somali: Suldaan Cismaan Suldaan Cali Kooshin), was the former supreme traditional clan sultan of the Isamusa. His family were the traditional holders of the Isamusa Sultanate.

Osman sultan ali koshin lived in united arab emirates before he died in 2021.

== Sources ==
- DUBUR: Shirweynihii Beesha Ciise Muuse oo si habsami ah u socda iyo nuxurka hadalladii goobta ka yidhaahdeen Ergooyinkii ka qayb galay
- Suldaanka guud ee Ciise Muuse oo Raalli-gelin ka bixiyey Aflagaaddo ka soo yeedhay Suldaan Beeshiisa ka tirsan
- Beesha Reer Cadaawe(Ciise Muuse) Oo Shaaciyey Suldaan Ay Dhawaan Caleemo Saari Doonaan
