= Isa Musa =

Somali clan

Isa Musa Ciisemuuse عيسىى موسى
- Isaaq Somali Clan
- Ethnicity: (Somalia) Somali
- Location: Somalia; Somaliland (Ethiopia) Ethiopia (Kenya) Kenya; Djibouti (United Arab Emirates) UAE (United Kingdom) UK (United States) US
- Descended from: Isa ibn Musa ibn Zubayr ibn Abdirahman ibn Sheikh Isḥāq ibn Aḥmad
- Parent tribe: Isaaq
- Branches: Abokor Isa; Idrais Isa; Adam Isa; Mohamed Isa
- Language: (Somalia) Somali (Arab League) Arabic
- Religion: Sunni, Islam

The Isa Musa ,also contemporarily known as the Isamusa (Somali: Ciisemuuse, Arabic: عيسى موسى), also spelled Issamussa, Issamousa, Issemuosa, Issamuse or Isemuse(Full Name: ’Isa ibn Musa ibn Zubayr ibn Abd al-Raḥmān ibn ash-Shaykh Isḥāq ibn Aḥmad), is a prominent major Somali clan which is part of the Isaaq family clan. The Isa Musa traditionally consists of coastal people, nomadic pastoralist and merchants. This clan are primarily settled in Somaliland, including Maroodi Jeex, Togdheer, Sahil, Awdal, Mugadisho, Djibouti, Yemen, Ethiopia, as well as Kenya.

The Isa Musa have produced many prominent Somali figures with the deputy secretary general of the United Nations Abdulrahim Abby Farah

== History ==
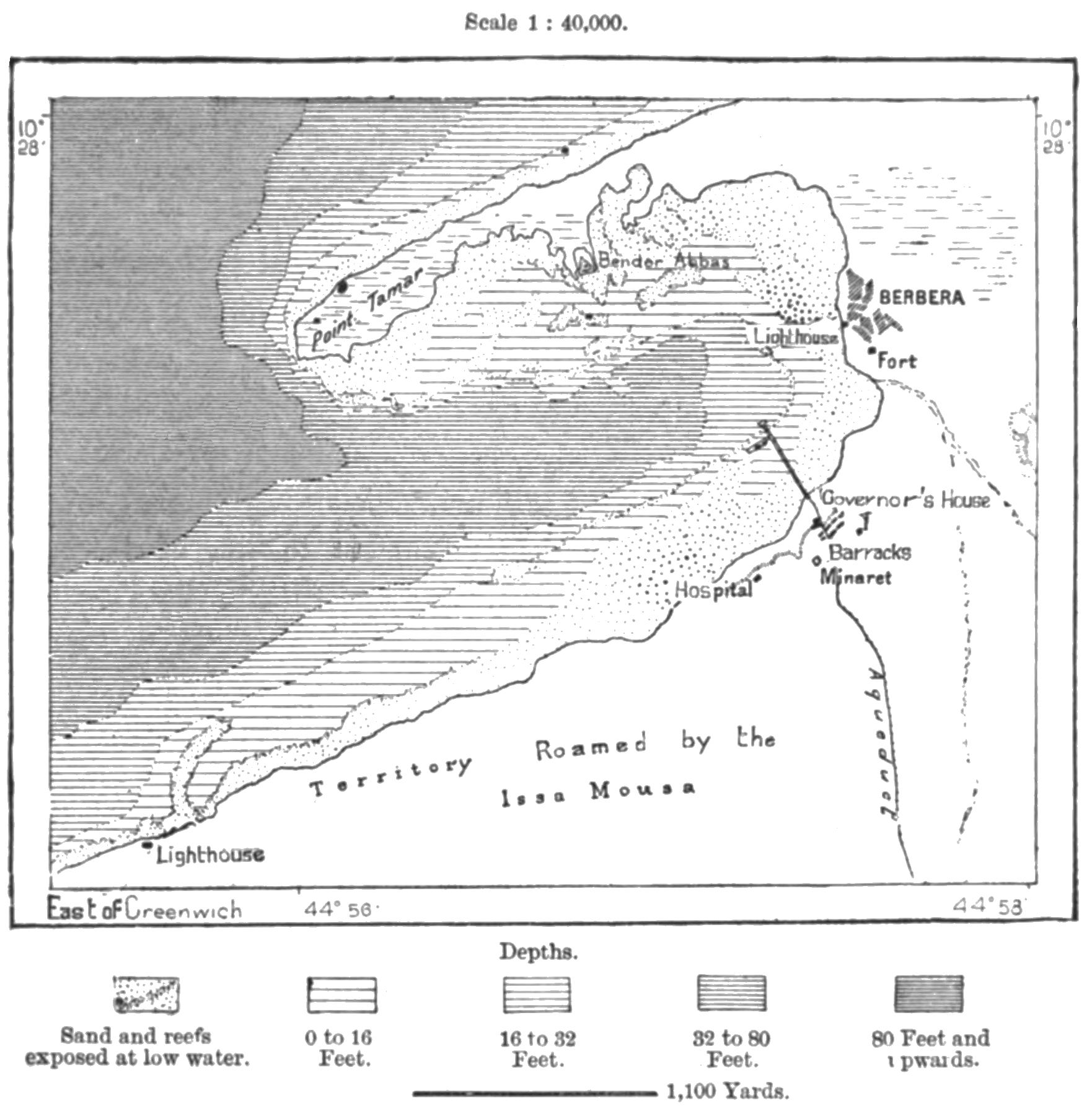
1893 map of Berbera featuring the Isa Musa (Issa Mousa) clan

Historically, the Isa Musa made use of the very valuable caravan trade in the Horn of Africa. Deriving income from arriving caravans into the markets of the coastal city of Berbera. The Isa Musa were able to impose a transit duty per camel loaded with merchandise.

The Isa Musa, whose pasture area is the coastal plain, also collect a toll of 4 anas (about 48 pence) from the caravans for the loaded dromedary and 1 ana for each sheep and each goat brought by other tribes to the market in Berbera.

Other accounts state that the toll fee was higher

For the caravans coming from the interior, the rate of what they have to pay to each tribe of the coast is fixed; thus in the Issa Mussa it is half a rupee for a loaded camel, and 5 ana (about L. 0.50) for an unloaded camel

Along with the wider Habr Awal, the Isa Musa has a mercantile history, particularly in Berbera and the caravan routes leading to the Ogaden. Habr Awal trading expeditions that ventured into the interior hired local Abbans, who facilitated commerce and provided security

"Among the Somalis, the real merchants are the Habr Aual. To negotiate they go to a village and settle in huts given to them by the Aban or made by their own women, and there they negotiate in person with whoever wants to buy. Except for the milk, given as a gift by the Aban, they have to buy their own food"

The Isa Musa engaged in trade directly, dealing in livestock, hides, gum arabic, which they exchanged and brought back their exchanges to the markets of Berbera. Their trading expeditions often preferred certain routes

"The Isa Musa caravans prefer the western road leading via Aroli [Arori] and Toyo to Ogadeen"

Gustav Adolf Haggenmacher. Descended from the Issa Muse who came from Berbera and were on their journey into the interior. They informed us that they had encountered around forty men who were looking for me. Somali-lande, 1874.

The Italian explorer and geographer Luigi Robecchi Brichetti had a similar remark in aspect of the valuable caravan trade, where he also mentioned the kindred Ayal Ahmad, Sa´ad Musa

According to the account of Bricchetti, the Isa Musa were able to attain revenue thanks to the busy caravan traffic entering & leaving the coastal and historical city of Berbera

They pass for skilled camel breeders and intelligent caravan organizers [Ayal Achmed]. And such are also the different families of the Isa Musa, who live off the caravan traffic with the Ogaden, going up to Uebi [Webi] along the Faf (Fafan) route.

The Issa Muse, along with the wider Habr Awal clan family, formed the majority of the Somali merchants who frequented Aden and other Southern Arabian ports. Conducting independent trading expeditions on their own vessels to Arabian ports. They procured various raw goods from Harar and the interior in exchange for manufactured goods. During their stay, the Habr Awal rented their own houses and hired their own servants, whereas other Somali clans tended to stay with relatives already established across the Gulf.

Merchants. — These are generally members of the Habr Awal tribe. They bring from Harrar and the Galla country, coffee, saffron (bastard), tusks (ivory), and feathers, taking away in return zinc, brass, broad cloth, and piece goods. They remain in Aden for about twenty days at a time during the trading season, which lasts about nine months,' making four trips. During their residence they hire a house, and are accompanied by their own domestics.

The ‘Isa Musa, weren't only involved in the commodity trade but also in the livestock trade. Exporting their livestock to Southern Arabian ports like Aden through Berbera. According to a 1895 publication by Captain H. G. C. Swayne.

the Issa Musa export their cattle and sheep to Aden. They have agents at Berbera, and as opportunities offer, batches of, say, ten oxen or two hundred sheep are brought down for export, marching by easy stages. Coming from Bur’o, eighty miles from the coast, cattle or sheep reach Berbera in four to six days, while caravans generally cover the distance in three days.

The Issa Muse have produced many prominent Somali figures with the Undersecretary General of the United Nations Abdulrahim Abby Farah, the first Somali Prime Minister & second President of Somaliland Muhammad Haji Ibrahim Egal, former vice President of the Somali Democratic Republic and of the 1/5 of the Supreme Revolutionary Council General Ahmed Mohamoud Farah, former vice president of Somaliland Ahmed Yusuf Yasin and the second tallest man in the world Hussein Bisad.

=== The Blockade of Berbera (1855-1856) ===
The Blockade of Berbera (1855-1856) was a British naval action against the port of Berbera, following an attack on Lieutenant Richard Burton's camp. The assault, which resulted in the death of Lieutenant Stroyan and injuries to Burton and his companions, was attributed primarily to the Isa Musa, as well as other subclans in the Habr Awal. The attack was reportedly led by Aw Ali (Ou Ali), a figure associated with the Isa Musa

In response, the British authorities in Aden imposed a naval blockade on Berbera, aiming to force the local Habr Awal into durrendering the attackers. The blockade had serious economic consequences, as it disrupted Berbera's trade with the Arabian Peninsula. Additionally, as a punitive measure, the Isa Musa clan was temporarily banned from Aden, cutting them off from an essential trade hub and impacting their commercial activities

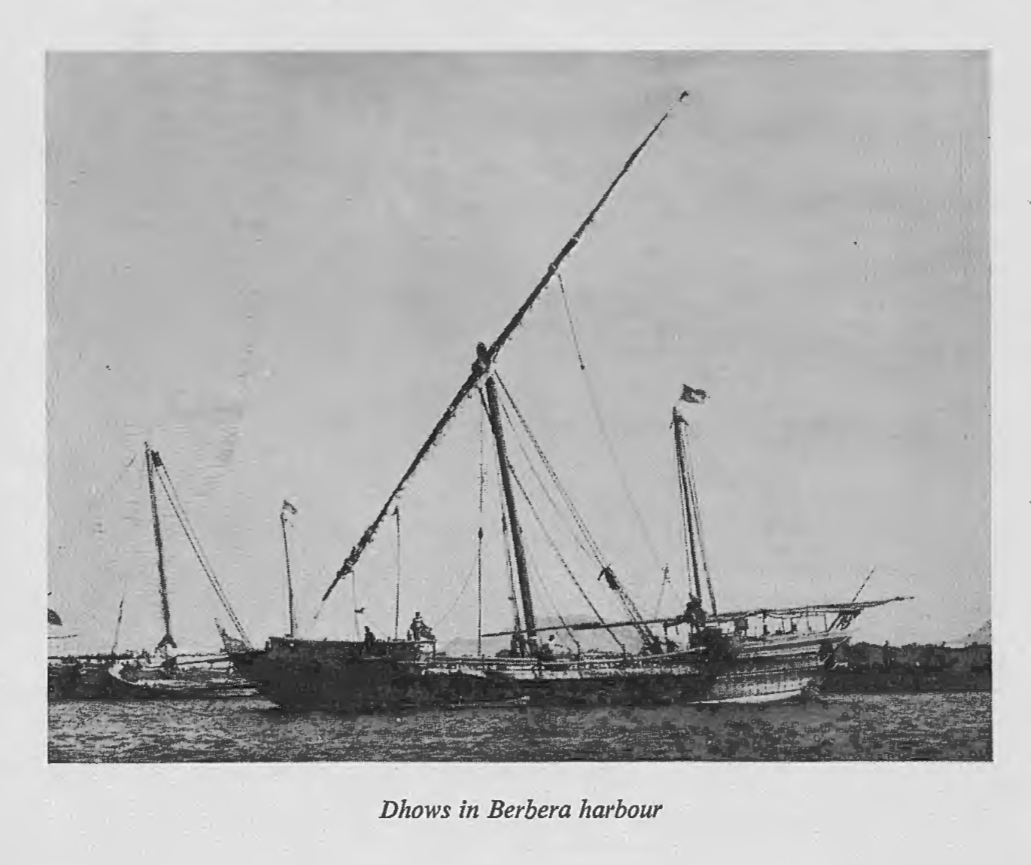
Dhows in Berbera harbour

== Clans ==
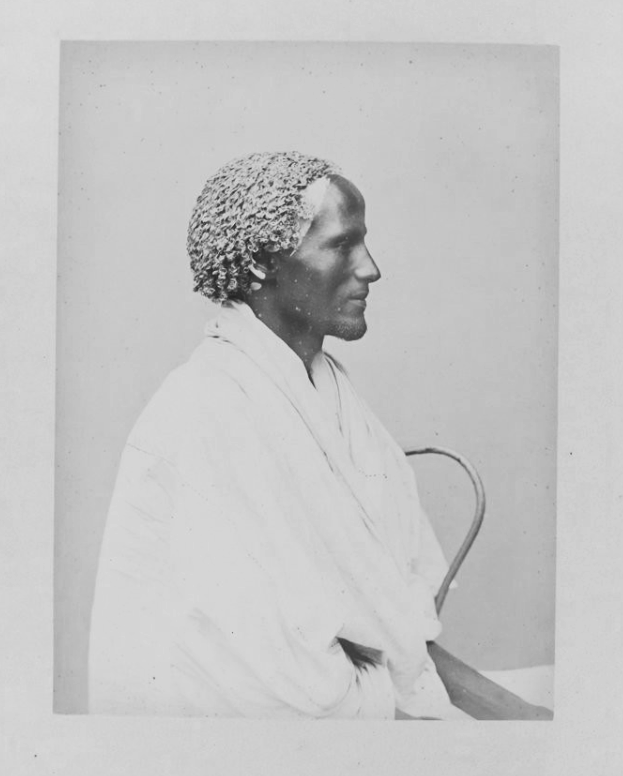
Ahmed Amar age 25 of the Issa Muse, photographed by Roland Bonaparte, 1890

A summarized clan family, with four of the major subclans of Issa Muse is presented below.

- Sheikh Isaaq Bin Ahmed (Sheikh Isaaq)
  - Habar Habuusheed
    - Ahmed (Tol-Ja'lo)
    - Muuse (Habr Je'lo)
    - Ibrahiim (Sanbuur)
    - Muhammad ('Ibraan)
  - Habar Magaadle
    - Ismail (Garhajis )
    - Muhammad (Arap)
    - Ayub
    - Abdirahman (Habar Awal)
      - Sa'ad Musa
      - Issa Musa

The four major subclans of Issa Muse are:

  - Abokor Issa
  - Iderias Issa
  - Adam Issa
  - Mohammed Issa

== Notable figures ==
- Sultan Osman Sultan Ali Koshin, the current general sultan of the Isa Musa clans, his family was the traditional sultanate holders of Isa Musa clans
- Hussain Bisad, the second tallest man in the world, previously held the record for the largest hands of anyone alive
- Abdulrahim Abby Farah, Under-Secretary-General of the United Nations 1979–1990 and Permanent Representative of Somali Republic to the United Nations 1965–1972.
- Muhammad Haji Ibrahim Egal, first Somali prime minister 1960, double time prime minister 1967–1969. President of Somaliland, 1993–2002.
- General Ahmed Mohamoud Farah “Ina lah-was”, former vice-president of Somalia and member of the 5th Supreme Revolutionary Council (SRC) of Somalia
- Aar Guruxeed- Geologist and philosopher specializing in rural and urban culture. until 1939 he was famous for his political slogans and short poems and catchword which he recited on the forum.
- Ahmed Mohamed Obsiye Speaker of the Parliament of Somali Republic 1964-1967.
- Ahmed Yusuf Yasin, former vice-president of Somaliland and the former second chairman of UDUB party 2002-2010.
- Ali Jama Habil, contemporary Somali poet of the golden age
- Ali Omar Mohamed “Ali Hor-hor”, former longest serving general manager of Berbera Port the current served as the Minister of Employment, Social and Family Affairs of the Republic of Somaliland (MoESFA)
- Said Hassan Abdilahi, current General Manager of the port of Berbera
- Hassan Gadhweyneh, the Deputy-Mayor of Mogadishu(1975-1991), Governor of Sahil region(1998-2003, the Mayor of Berbera(1998-2003) and the longest serving Minister of Education of Somaliland (2003–2010
- Sheikh Osman Noor, the first religious leader of Burao, Togdheer
- Armiye Odowa’a, the first mayor of Burao, Togdheer
- Jamal Ali Hussein Somali politician and economist, former chief executive officer (CEO) for Citibank Tanzania, former presidential candidate of UCID party in Somaliland
- Abdullahi Abokor Osman, current Ministry of Transportation and Roads Development of the Republic of Somaliland
- Abdi Haybe Laampad, comedian
- Dr. Saad Ali Shire, currently serving as the minister of finance in the Republic of Somaliland. Shire formerly served as the foreign minister of Somaliland
- Adan Haji Ali, the current chief justice Ministry of Justice (Somaliland)
- Abdishakur Iddin, the current mayor of Berbera which is the former capital of Somaliland before Hargeisa
- Khaled Abdirahman Hassan, historian, geopolitics analyst and philosopher
