= Somalia–United Kingdom relations =

- Somalia: United Kingdom

Somalia–United Kingdom relations are bilateral relations between Somalia and the United Kingdom.

== History ==
The first recorded contact between Somali clans and the United Kingdom occurred accidentally When a British vessel named the Mary Anne attempted to dock in Berbera's port in 1825 it was attacked and multiple members of the crew were massacred by the Garhajis. In response the Royal Navy enforced a blockade and some accounts narrate a bombardment of the city. In 1827 two years later the British arrived and extended an offer to relieve the blockade which had halted Berbera's lucrative trade in exchange for indemnity. Following this initial suggestion the Battle of Berbera 1827 would break out. After the Isaaq defeat Captain James Gordon Bremer sent a delegation on shore to the Sheikhs of the Habr Awal and expressed his desire to speak to them regarding the 1825 attack on the Mary Anne,in which they agreed to pay

15,000 Spanish dollars by the Isaaq Sultanate leaders for the destruction of the ship and loss of life.

In April 1855, explorer Lieutenant Richard Burton had set out on his search for the source of the Nile and was encamped near Berbera. On 19 April, his camp was attacked and plundered. In response, British forces blockaded the port city of Berbera in the Isaaq Sultanate from 1855 to 1856. It was the second British military action against the city after the 1827 attack on Berbera.

Burton Also identified the attackers as three sub-tribes of the Hab Awal clan in a letter to Brigadier Coughlin, the British Resident at Aden, on 23 April 1855:

23 April 1855

R.F Burton to Colonel W. Coughlin

The BT. Resident

Aden, Arabia

Sir,

I have the honor of enclose a report from Lt. Herne & a statement from Lt. Speke concerning the melancholy occurrence of the 19th inst...

The people chiefly implicated in this outrage are the Mikahil, the Ayyal Ahmad & the Eesa Musa - all three sub tribes of the great clan, Habr Awal. The 2, however, are but little concerned. The Eesa Musa is the principal actor.

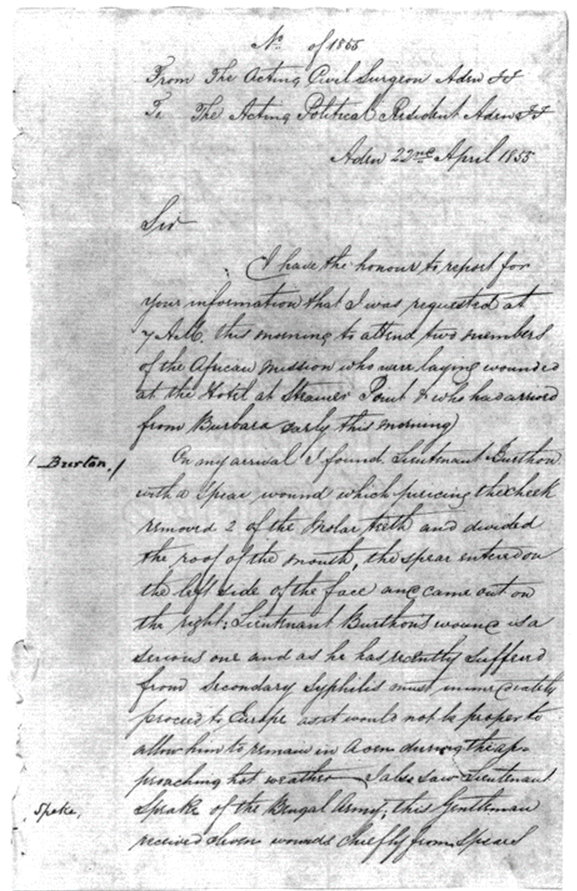
The report of the Civil Surgeon of Aden regarding the fatal event in Berbera.

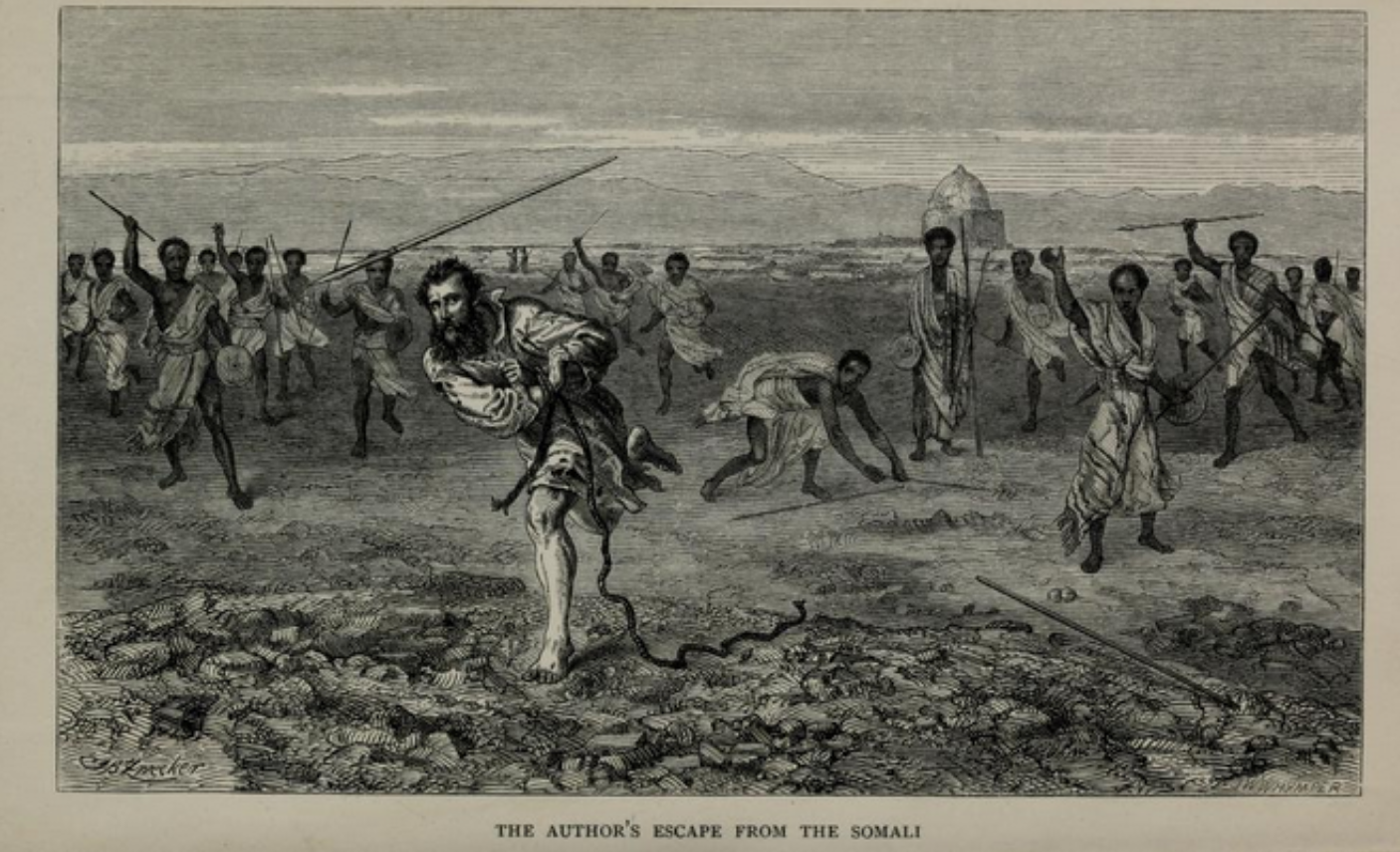
Ambush of Richard F. Burton by the Habr Awal clan near Berbera, 1855.

According to Lieutenant John Hanning Speke, a surviving member of the attacked crew, the attackers were led by Ou Ali (Aw Cali). The prefix of Aw signifies Islamic importance in the Somali language.

The blockade ceased on 9 November 1856 following a treaty that was signed between the British East India Company and the Sheikhs of the Habr Awal, Ishaaq. This was signed in the presence of Captain H. L. Playfair, the assistant political resident in Aden. This treaty's six articles secured the economic and commercial interests of both parties.

=== Partition of Africa ===
After the Berlin Conference Relations Restored between Isaaq Sultanate and the United Kingdom date back to the 19th century. In 1884, Britain established the British Somali Coast Protectorate in northern Somalia (now Somaliland) Because of Menelik II's expansions after signing successive treaties with the then ruling Somali Sultans, such as Mohamoud Ali Shire of the Warsangali. In 1900, the Dervish leader Mohammed Abdullah Hassan began a twenty-year resistance movement against British troops. This military campaign eventually came to an end in 1920, after Britain aerially bombarded the Dervish capital of Taleh. Following World War II, Britain retained control of both British Somaliland and Italian Somaliland as protectorates. In 1945, during the Potsdam Conference, the United Nations granted Italy trusteeship of Italian Somaliland, but only under close supervision and on the condition—first proposed by the Somali Youth League (SYL) and other nascent Somali political organizations, such as Hizbia Digil Mirifle Somali (HDMS) and the Somali National League (SNL)—that Somalia achieve independence within ten years. British Somaliland remained a protectorate of Britain until 1960.

In 1948, under pressure from their World War II allies and to the dismay of the Somalis, the British "returned" the Haud (an important Somali grazing area that was presumably 'protected' by British treaties with the Somalis in 1884 and 1886) and the Ogaden to Ethiopia, based on a treaty they signed in 1897 in which the British ceded Somali territory to the Ethiopian Emperor Menelik in exchange for his help against raids by Somali clans. Britain included the proviso that the Somali residents would retain their autonomy, but Ethiopia immediately claimed sovereignty over the area. This prompted an unsuccessful bid by Britain in 1956 to buy back the Somali lands it had turned over. Britain also granted administration of the almost exclusively Somali-inhabited Northern Frontier District (NFD) to Kenyan nationalists despite an informal plebiscite demonstrating the overwhelming desire of the region's population to join the newly formed Somali Republic.

=== Independence and union with the Trust Territory of Somaliland ===
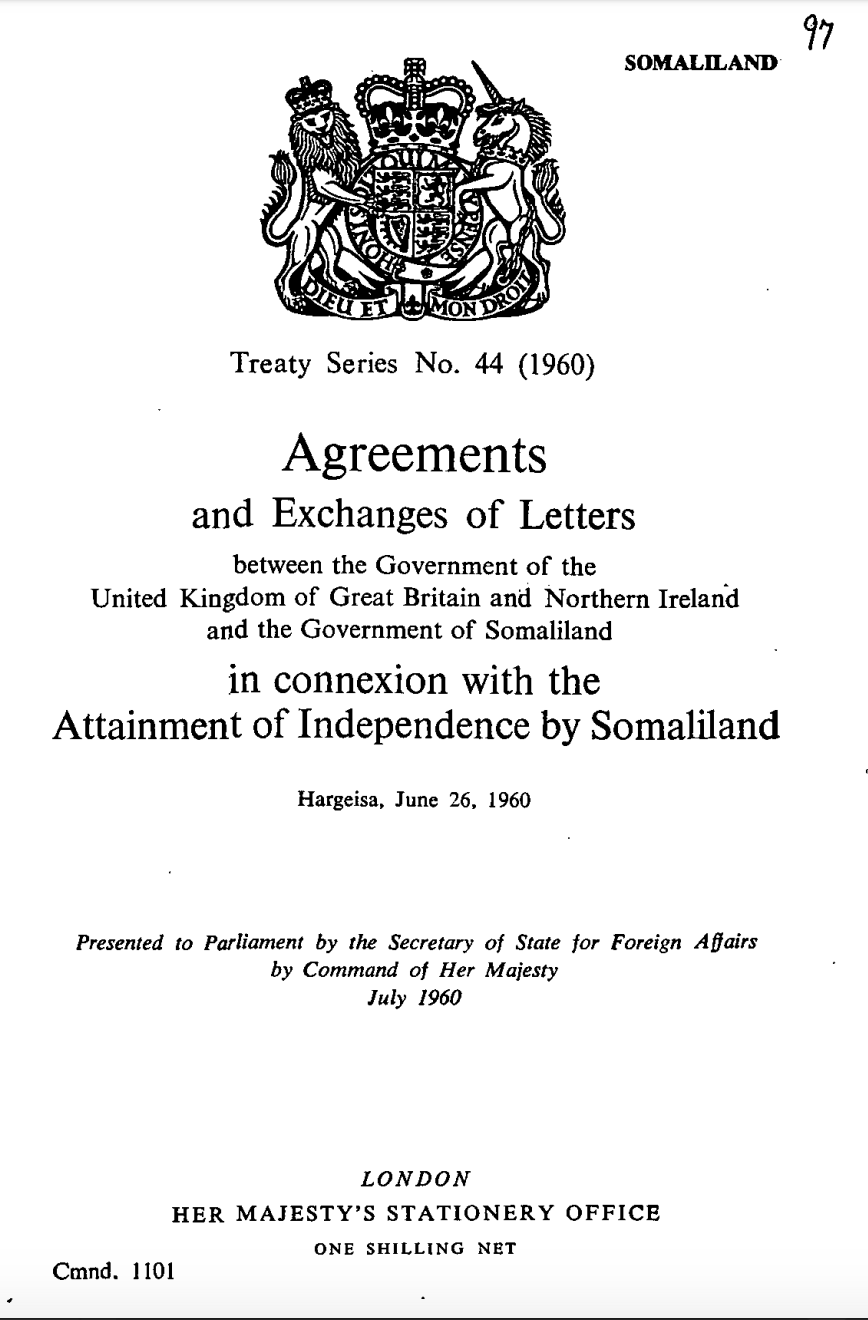
Agreements and Exchanges of Letters between the Government of the United Kingdom of Great Britain and Northern Ireland and the Government of Somaliland in connexion with the Attainment of Independence by Somaliland

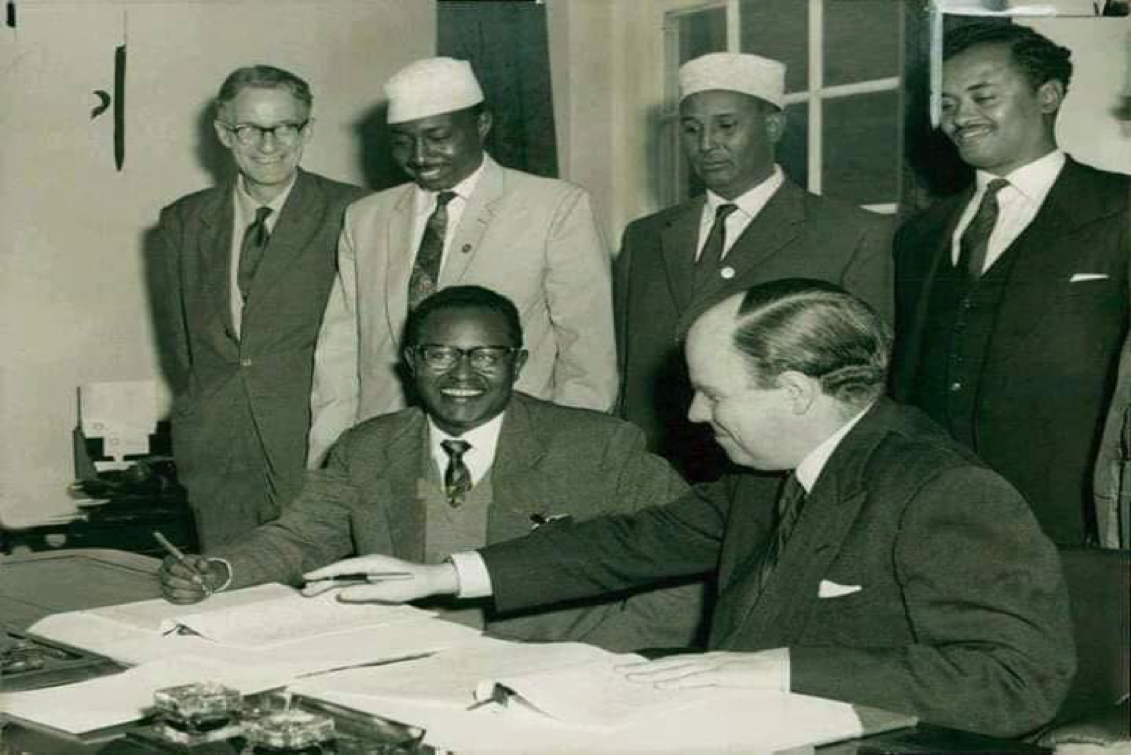
The Somaliland Protectorate Constitutional Conference, London, May 1960 in which it was decided that 26 June would be the day of Independence, and so signed on 12 May 1960. Somaliland Delegation: Mohamed Haji Ibrahim Egal, Ahmed Haji Dualeh, Ali Garad Jama and Haji Ibrahim Nur. From the Colonial Office: Ian Macleod, D. B. Hall, H. C. F. Wilks (Secretary)

In 1947, the entire budget for the administration of the British Somaliland protectorate was only £213,139.

The transfer of Haud territory to Ethiopia in 1954 became a significant catalyst for nationalist sentiment and the emergence of the independence movement in British Somaliland. Following the decision, Somali representatives submitted petitions and sent delegations to both the Government of the United Kingdom in London and the United Nations Headquarters in New York City. In 1956, the Government of the United Kingdom declared that it would not oppose a future political union between British Somaliland and the Trust Territory of Somaliland (former Italian Somaliland) should such a request be made by the people of the protectorate.

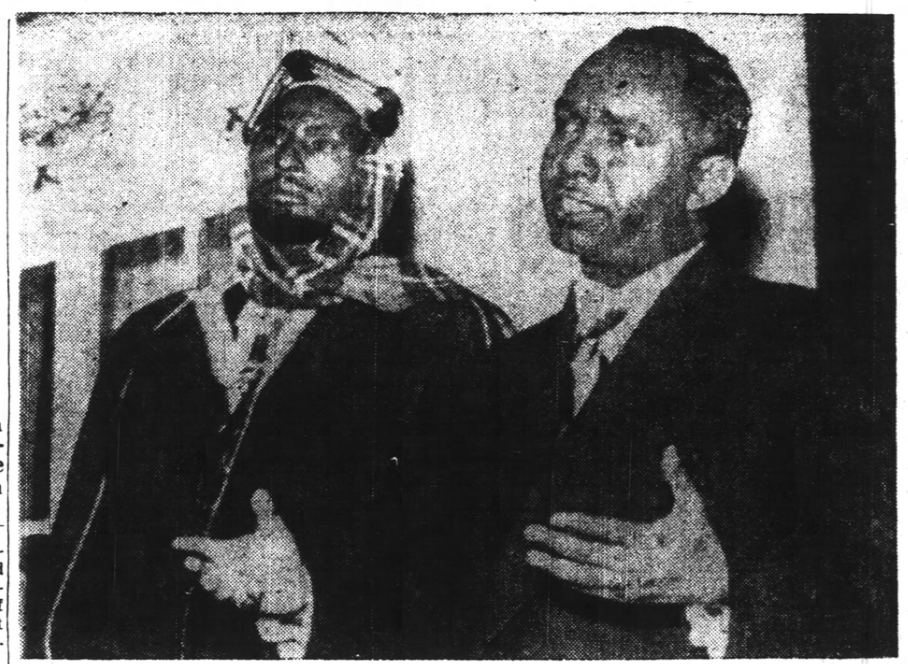
Michael Mariano speaking in New York in 1955 to protest the transfer of the Somali-inhabited Haud region to Ethiopia.

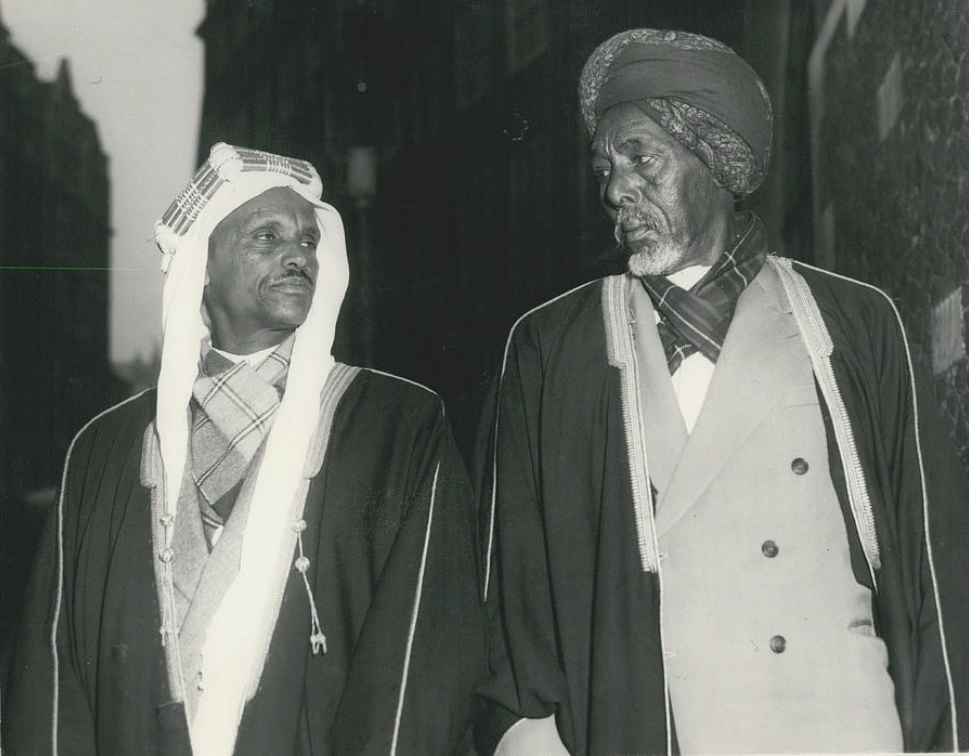
Isaaq clan leaders Abdillahi Deria (right) and Abdulrahman Deria (left) in London in 1955 petitioning against the transfer of the Haud.

In May 1960, the British Government stated that it would be prepared to grant independence to the then Somaliland protectorate. The Legislative Council of British Somaliland passed a resolution in April 1960 requesting independence. The legislative councils of the territory agreed to this proposal.

In April 1960, leaders of the two territories met in Mogadishu and agreed to form a unitary state. An elected president was to be head of state. Full executive powers would be held by a prime minister answerable to an elected National Assembly of 123 members representing the two territories.

On 26 June 1960, the British Somaliland protectorate gained independence as the State of Somaliland. Five days later, on 1 July 1960, Somaliland officially merged with the Trust Territory of Somaliland to create the Somali Republic.

On 1 July 1960 the legislature elected Haji Bashir, the old speaker of the Somaliland Assembly, as the first President of the new Republic of Somalia National Assembly, and also on that same day Aden Adde was elected as the President of the newly formed Somali Republic.

Between 1963 and 1968, the Somali government severed diplomatic ties with the UK authorities over the Northern Frontier District issue. It later reestablished relations following the rise to power of the Supreme Revolutionary Council in 1969.

After the collapse of the Somali central government and the start of the civil war in 1991, the UK embassy in Mogadishu closed down. In the ensuing period, the British government maintained diplomatic ties with the newly formed Transitional National Government and its successor the Transitional Federal Government. It also engaged Somalia's smaller regional administrations, such as Puntland and Somaliland, to ensure broad-based inclusion in the peace process. In 2012, the British authorities additionally organized the London Conference on Somalia to coordinate the international community's support for the interim Somali government.

Following the establishment of the Federal Government of Somalia in August 2012, the British authorities re-affirmed the UK's continued support for Somalia's government, its territorial integrity and sovereignty.

On the 23rd of March 2017 UK Foreign Minister Boris Johnson chaired a council meeting on the humanitarian and political situation in the Horn of Africa nation in the face of upcoming famine concerns. A week before this Johnson visited Mogadishu to Salk with Somali President Mohamed Abdullahi Mohamed about a strategy to avert any crisis.

== Diplomatic missions ==
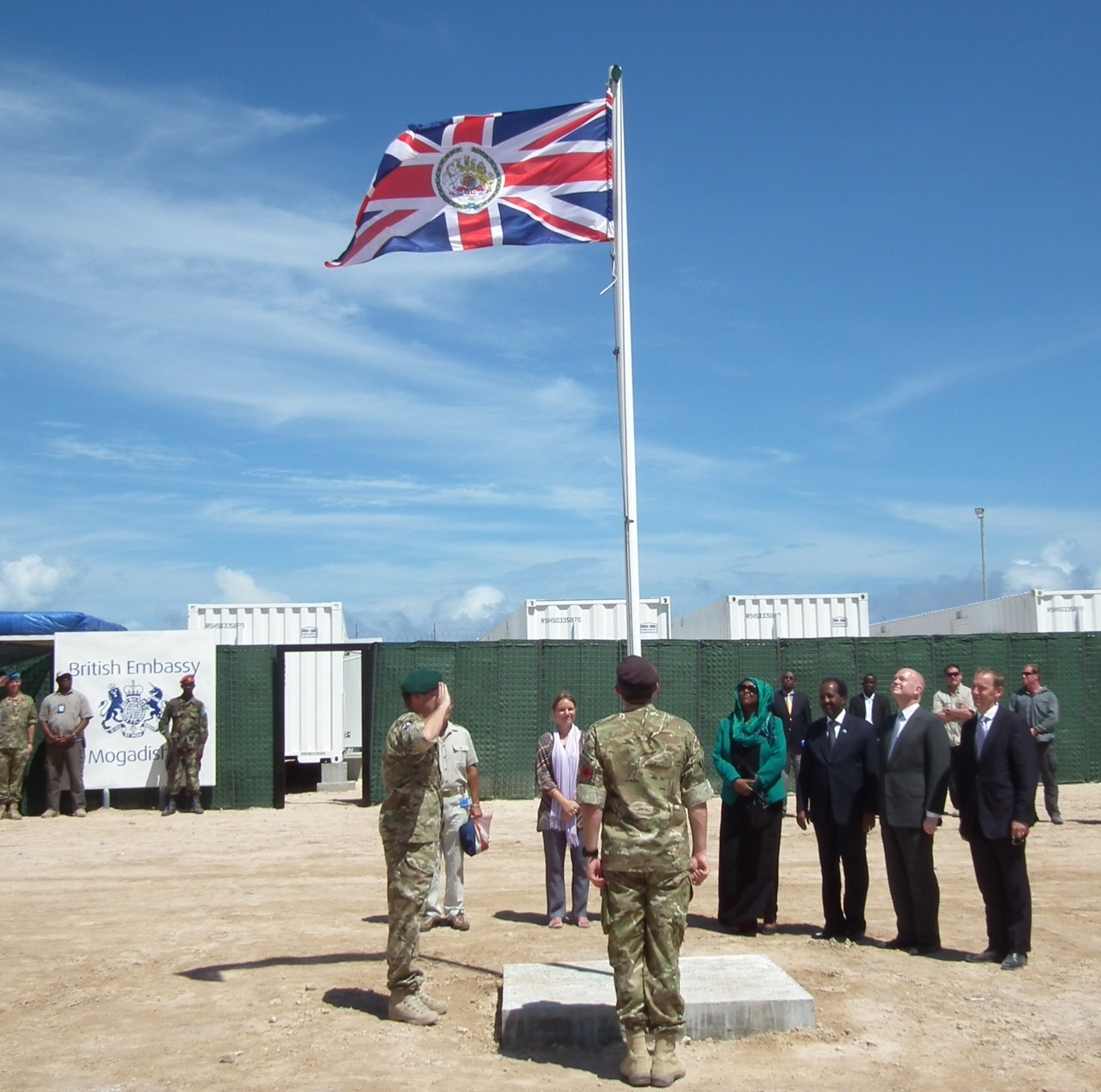
The British Embassy's re-opening ceremony in Mogadishu, 2013

The Somali Embassy in London closed in 1994, but was reopened in 2023, and has resumed operating its passport office. Abdulkadir Abdi Hashi is the current Ambassador, taking up his post in January 2025.

On 25 April 2013, the UK became the first western country to re-open its embassy in Somalia, with British First Secretary of State William Hague attending the opening ceremony in Mogadishu. On 6 June 2013, the British government appointed Neil Wigan as the new British Ambassador to Somalia. He succeeded Matt Baugh. On 19 February 2025 it was announced that Charles King would replace Mike Nithavrianakis as Ambassador to Somalia.

== See also ==
- Foreign relations of Somalia
- Foreign relations of the United Kingdom
