= Dualeh =

Dualeh is a Somali language surname. People with the name include:

- Ahmed Haji Dualeh, Somali independence activist, politician, and diplomat
- Ahmed Farah Dualeh, Somali-Danish community worker and politician
- Hussein Abdi Dualeh, Somali politician and petroleum engineer
- Khadra Ahmed Dualeh, Somalian politician and diplomat
- Raqiya Haji Dualeh Abdalla, Somali sociologist and politician
