= Anglo-Isaaq conflicts =

1825–1945 conflicts

Date	1825–1945 (120 years)
Location	Somaliland
Result	Peace treaty
Territorial changes	Establishment of the British Somaliland Protectorate

Belligerents
Isaaq Sultanate: Saad Musa; Habar Yoonis; Isa Musa; Habar Jeclo	British Empire

The Anglo-Isaaq conflicts were a series of confrontations between British forces and the Isaaq clan-family via naval and land warfare, including the Isaaq and its sub-clans, in the Somaliland region from 1825 to 1884. These conflicts arose as the British Empire sought to expand commercial influence and strategic control along the Gulf of Aden, particularly over key ports and trading hubs such as Berbera.

The first of these conflicts occurred in 1825, when a British ship named the Mary Anne was attacked, sacked, and plundered by Isaaq forces in the port city of Berbera. The attack led to a British blockade of the city and subsequent negotiations with the Sultanate. Further incidents occurred in the 1850s, notably with the attack on British exploring expeditions and the Blockade of Berbera (1855), which were key points of friction between the British and the Isaaq. the dangers and the costs put off new British expeditions in the region until the 1880s.

After the establishment of the British Somaliland Protectorate in 1884, tensions continued between the Isaaq and British authorities.

These conflicts, though interspersed with treaties and agreements, ultimately resulted in the incorporation of Isaaq territories into British Somaliland, shaping the political landscape of the region for decades.

== Background ==
The coastal Isaaq tribes resisted external interference and exploration parties in their territories and economic affairs, defending their sovereignty and asserting the autonomy of their sultanates and sub-clans.

The port of Berbera was central to these tensions. Its strategic location made it a vital trade link between the interior of Somaliland and Aden, as well as other parts of the Arabian Peninsula. British attempts to regulate trade, impose tariffs, and exert authority over the population frequently met with resistance from Isaaq leaders who sought to preserve local control. These confrontations reflected a wider pattern of indigenous resistance across the Horn of Africa, as local polities opposed European colonial encroachment.

== History ==
In 1825, Isaaq forces attacked, sacked, and plundered the British ship Mary Anne in the port of Berbera. The Isaaq were victorious, forcing the British Empire to impose a temporary naval blockade and engage in negotiations with the Isaaq Sultanate. This event demonstrated the Isaaq's military capability and strategic knowledge of the region.

In the 1830s, the Isaaq Sultan Farah Guled and Haji Ali penned a letter to Sultan bin Saqr Al Qasimi of Ras Al Khaimah requesting military assistance and joint religious war against the British. This would not materialize as Sultan Saqr was incapacitated by prior Persian Gulf campaign of 1819 and was unable to send aid to Berbera. Alongside their stronghold in the Persian Gulf & Gulf of Oman the Qasimi were very active both militarily and economically in the Gulf of Aden and were given to plunder and attack ships as far west as the Mocha on the Red Sea. They had numerous commercial ties with the Somalis, leading vessels from Ras Al Khaimah and the Persian Gulf to regularly attend trade fairs in the large ports of Berbera and Zeila and were very familiar with the Isaaq.

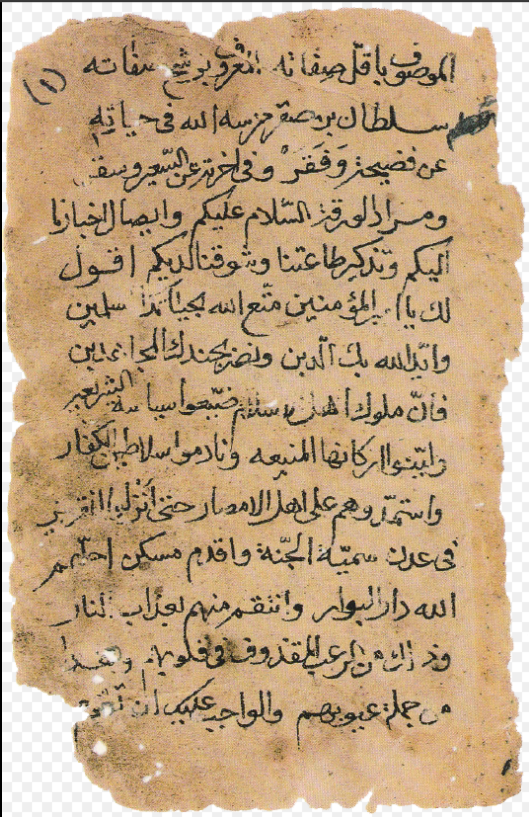
Isaaq Sultan Farah Guled to Sultan Saqr in the 1820s

In 1855 and 1856, an expedition led by Richard Burton was attacked near Berbera by Habr Awal horsemen under Ou Ali. Lieutenant Stroyan was killed, Burton was wounded, and John Hanning Speke was captured. In response, the British Empire imposed a naval blockade of Berbera to compel the surrender of the attackers.

The Isaaq successfully resisted handing over Ou Ali, resulting in a partial Isaaq victory. The eventual treaty granted limited commercial rights to the British Empire but preserved the autonomy of significant Isaaq sub-clans.

In the 1880s, following the Dervish wars, the British Empire negotiated treaties with coastal Isaaq sub-clans. By this time, the central authority of the Isaaq Sultanate had weakened, though sub-groups such as the Eidagale and Isaaq Arreh retained control over local trade and governance. These agreements reflected a complex balance of power: the British Empire achieved a degree of influence, but the Isaaq maintained substantial autonomy.

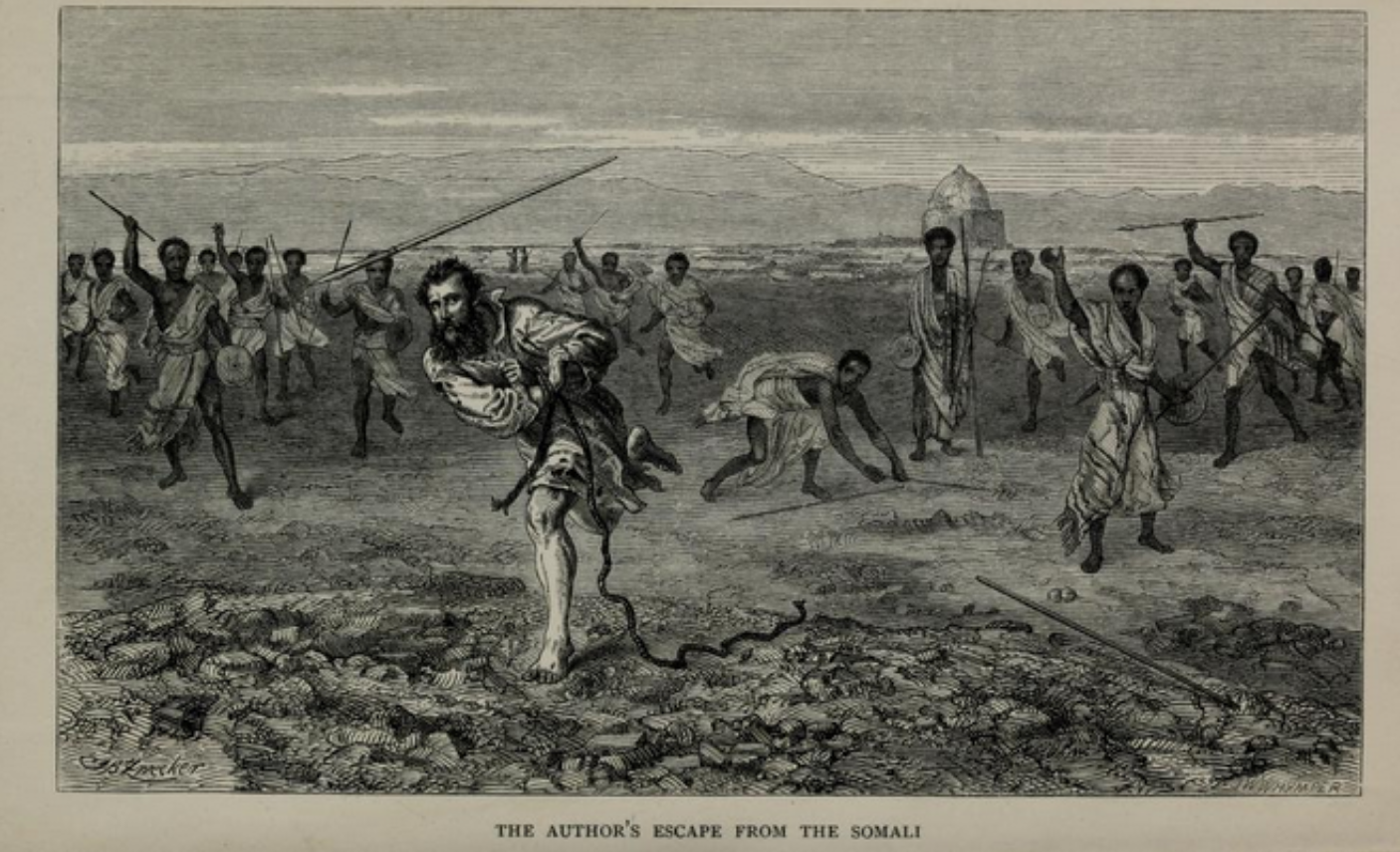
Ambush of Richard F. Burton by the Habr Awal clan near Berbera, 1855.

== Post Colonial Conflicts ==
In 1922, Habr Yunis clansmen in Burao revolted against British taxation and disarmament. During confrontations, Captain Allan Gibb was killed. The British Empire deployed military force, including aircraft, to suppress the revolt. Although the British Empire managed to bomb Burao, the Isaaq preserved their social cohesion and local governance, making this both a tactical victory and moral victory for the Isaaq.

In 1945, Sheikh Bashir led an anti-colonial uprising in central Somaliland. British Empire forces clashed with his followers, and Sheikh Bashir was killed in battle. While the British Empire won militarily, Sheikh Bashir's leadership became a symbol of resistance, inspiring later nationalist movements and contributing to Somaliland’s eventual de facto independence.

== Aftermath ==
The Anglo-Isaaq conflicts had significant political, social, and economic consequences for Somaliland and the British. While the British Empire established limited control over trade and taxation, the Isaaq retained substantial autonomy over local governance and internal affairs. The authority of traditional Isaaq Sultanate structures and sub-clans remained influential despite colonial intervention.

The repeated uprisings and blockades, including the Blockade of Berbera and the Burao tax revolt, demonstrated that military force alone could not fully subdue the Isaaq. The British administration increasingly relied on treaties and negotiated agreements to maintain order, resulting in a hybrid system in which local leaders managed internal affairs while Britain controlled external trade and strategic interests.

Socially, the conflicts strengthened Isaaq cohesion and identity. Leaders such as Sheikh Bashir became symbols of anti-colonial resistance, inspiring later political movements. The historical experience of resistance contributed to the development of the Dervish movement in the early 20th century and later the Somali National Movement, which played a key role in the establishment of Somaliland as a de facto independent state after 1991.

Economically, the conflicts affected trade along the Gulf of Aden. Although the British Empire secured ports such as Berbera for international commerce, Isaaq merchants continued to dominate regional trade networks. This allowed the Isaaq to maintain economic influence despite colonial control, providing resources for political and military organization.

== See also ==
- Isaaq Sultanate
- Isaaq Clan
- British Somaliland
- History of Somaliland
