= Præsidenten fra Nordvest =

- Official poster for the film
- Directed by: Lars Feldballe Petersen
- Starring: Ahmed Farah Dualeh
- Narrated by: Jacob Andersen
- Edited by: Jacob Andersen
- Music by: Povl Kristian
- Release date: 20 March 2017
- Running time: 65 minutes
- Country: Denmark

Præsidenten fra Nordvest (English: The President from Nordvest) is a Danish documentary film directed by Lars Feldballe Petersen about Amed Farah Dualeh's attempt to bring democratic values to Somalia during its civil war. The film premiered at the Danish Film Festival on 20 March 2017.

== Synopsis ==
My life has been a long journey, and I have been blessed to come to Denmark to study, it gave me the opportunity to lay the foundation and I will to return to Somalia to give something back.

— Ahmed Farah Dualeh

The documentary follows Somalian-born, Ahmed Farah Dualeh, and his ambition to gain political power in the Somali region of Jubaland. Dualeh's initial ambition is to become the prime minister rather than the president, as the role changes more frequently. Born into a poor nomadic family and living comfortably for 47 years in Denmark where he worked as a sea captain at Aalborg Portland, the 67-year-old feels compelled to re-engage with Somali politics, driven by his desire to give back to his homeland. The documentary addresses the increasing challenges faced by Dualeh as he lives as a Somali immigrant in Denmark amidst the country's rise of conservatism.

Supported by his wife, Zahra, he departs from his home in the Nordvest, Copenhagen with the ambition to rebuild Somalia, inspired by Danish democratic values. He finds that resistance in Somalia is strong, and successes are scarce. Over time, his foundation starts to weaken, causing a growing distance from his family in Denmark. The silent struggles of his wife are documented, along with her eventual acceptance of Dualeh's choices. Named by a group of Somali exiles, he is given the title of president-in-exile of Gedo, Middle Jubba, and Lower Jubba, which together form Jubaland. The film explores the risks Dualeh was prepared to undertake in his goal to rebuild his homeland. The documentary concludes with him abandoning his aspirations, citing a lack of understanding of the Somali political landscape.

== Production and release ==
The documentary was filmed over a period of three years, and is based on an idea by the film's editor and narrator Jacob Andersen. Petersen was inspired by Dualeh's story and admired his desire to instil democratic Danish values in a country which was embroiled in a civil war. The film was first broadcast on Danish television on channel DR2, in a 59-minute version, on 28 December 2017.
