= Raqiya Haji Dualeh Abdalla =

Somali sociologist and politician

Raqiya Haji Dualeh Abdalla زاقيي ا حاجي دوالي عبد الله
- Born: Somalia
- Education: College of Education (BA); Erasmus University Rotterdam (Master's)
- Occupations: President of the Somali Family Care Network, sociologist, politician
- Relatives: Khadra Ahmed Dualeh (niece) Ahmed Haji Dualeh Abdalla (brother)

Raqiya Haji Dualeh Abdalla (Somali: Raqiiyaa Xaaji Ducale Cabdille, Arabic: زاقيي ا حاجي دوالي عبد الله) is a Somali sociologist and politician. She has held a number of senior policy-making posts in governmental, non-governmental and international institutions, including as Vice Minister of Health of Somalia. She was also a founding member of the Somali Women's Democratic Organization (SWDO), serving as the group's Acting Chairperson and Vice President. Additionally, Raqiya is the founder and President of the Somali Family Care Network.

== Personal life ==
Raqiya was born in Somalia. For her post-secondary education, she earned a B.A. in Social Sciences from the College of Education in Mogadishu. Raqiya also holds a master's degree in Public Policy and Women in Development from the Institute of Social Studies which is part of Erasmus University Rotterdam based in The Hague, Netherlands.

== Career ==
Raqiya is a trained sociologist. She has held a number of senior policy-making posts in governmental, non-governmental and international institutions.

Raqiya was a founding member of the Somali Women's Democratic Organization (SWDO). Established in 1977, it was the first women's parliamentary caucus in Somalia. She would also serve as the group's Acting Chairperson and Vice President. Among other initiatives, the SWDO was mandated with implementing the ruling Supreme Revolutionary Council's law prohibiting female genital mutilation. In this capacity, Raqiya initiated the first anti-FGM campaign in Somalia. In 1979, on behalf of the SWDO, she represented Somalia at the WHO global seminar in Khartoum. She was concurrently elected as Somalia's representative to the conference's five-person Sub-Committee, which was tasked with formulating resolutions and recommendations on FGM.

While working with the Ministry of Culture, Raqiya published Sisters in Affliction in 1982. It was the first book on infibulation by a Somali woman. The work had a widespread impact, particularly when it was later translated into Abdalla's native Somali language.

From 1983 to 1986, Raqiya was Somalia's Assistant or Vice Minister of Health. For a five-year period, she also served as Senior Program Advisor to the UNDP in Sudan.

Raqiya later served as a consultant for Immigrant and Refugee Services of America, a national voluntary agency. She therein held national workshops on reproductive rights for women immigrants from Somalia and Iraq, and worked with community leaders.

In 2001, Raqiya founded the Somali Family Care Network (SFCN) in Washington, D.C., serving as the group's president. The SFCN offers technical support to ethnic Somali community organizations in the United States. It also provides assistance on general health care to women immigrants from the Horn of Africa.
