= Attack on Burton's Camp =

- Part of Anglo-Isaaq conflicts
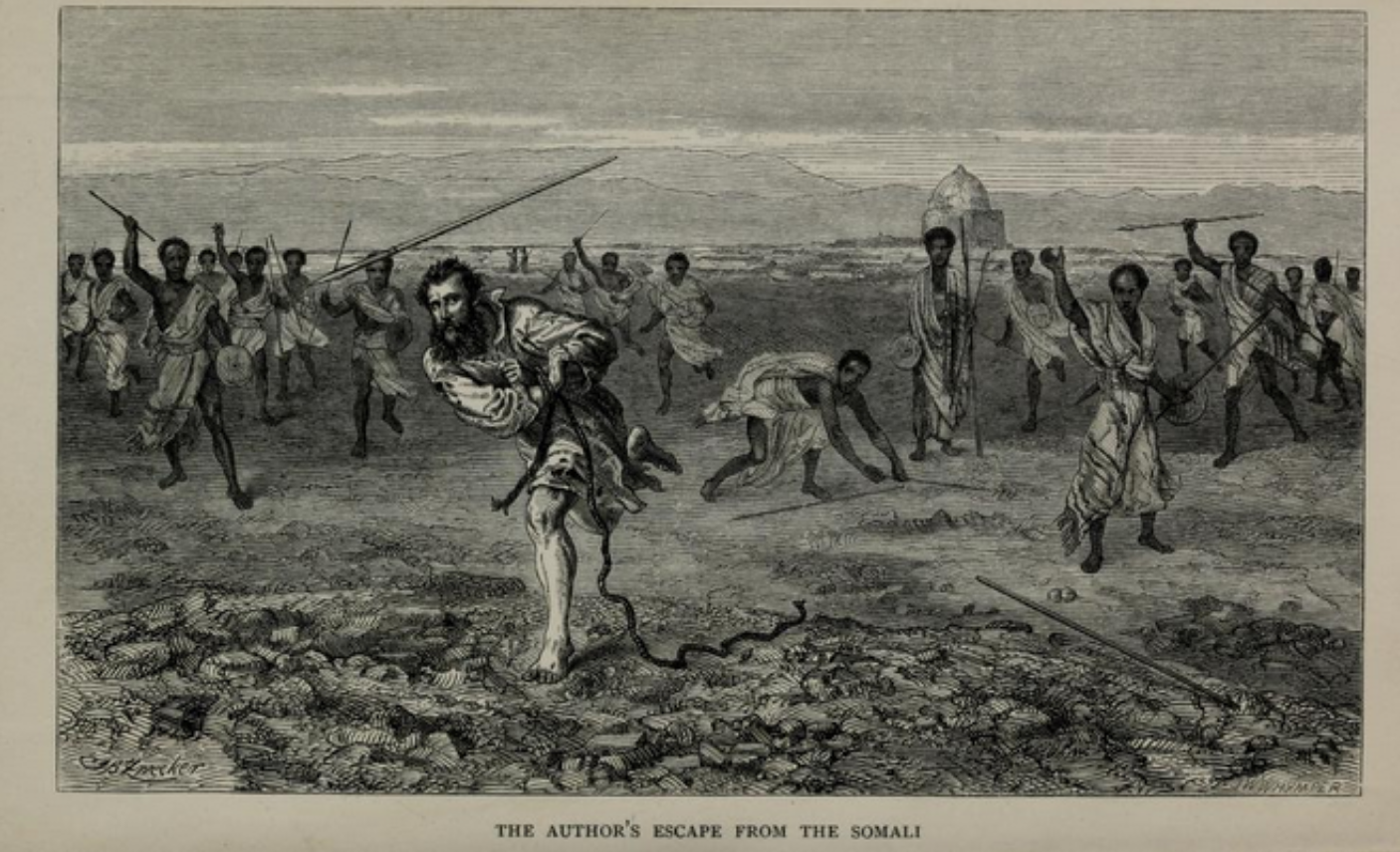
- depiction of the attack on Richard Burton
Date	19 April 1855; 171 years ago
Location	Near Berbera, Somaliland
Result	Isaaq-Senussi victory (Note: According to French explorer and geographer Henri Duveyrier, Members of the Senussi Order took part in the attack.)
Territorial changes	withdrawal of the British expedition to the Nile River

Belligerents
Isaaq Sultanate: Habr Awal; Senussi Order	British Empire

Commanders and leaders
Ou Ali (Aw Ali)	Richard Burton (WIA); John Speke (POW); Lieutenant Stroyan †

Strength
300 horsemen	3 officers several hundred footmen and camp followers

Casualties and losses
light	most killed or captured

The attack on Burton's Camp took place on April 19, 1855, near Berbera, when a group of Isaaqs, led by Ou Ali (Aw Cali), attacked a British expedition camp. The camp, led by Sir Richard Francis Burton, was part of his search for the source of the Nile. The attack resulted in the death of Lieutenant Stroyan, the wounding of Burton, and the capture of Captain Speke. The incident marked a significant confrontation between the British and the Isaaq clan, that would eventually lead to Berbera being blockaded by the Royal Navy in 1855.

== Background ==
In April 1855, British explorer Lieutenant Richard Burton set out on his search for the source of the Nile and was encamped near the port city of Berbera. On April 19, his camp was attacked and plundered by members of the Habr Awal clan, resulting in an Isaaq victory.

Burton's camp had been encountering mounting suspicion and hostility from local Somali clans due to his exploration activities and tensions over caravan and camels fees. This attack was a culmination of several incidents where Burton had clashed with the Habr Awal clan, particularly over local charges and his public discontent with their practices. Burton had also expressed his dissatisfaction with the payment of Abban fees, which were levied on local traders and travelers, including his own party.

== Attack details ==
On April 19, 1855, Burton's camp was attacked by several sub-tribes of the Habr Awal clan, including the Issa Musa and Mikahil sub-tribes. According to Burton's report, the primary actors in the attack were the Eesa Musa sub-tribe, led by Ou Ali (Aw Cali), a prominent figure in the clan. The attack was likely provoked by Burton's prior confrontations with the clan, particularly after he had criticized local practices and imposed heavy demands on the region's people. In addition, Burton's earlier encounter with three respected members of the Habr Awal clan, who had warned of Burton's spying activities in the region, had led to heightened suspicion.

== Outcome ==
During the attack, Lieutenant Stroyan was killed in action, while Lieutenant Burton was severely wounded, with an impaled injury to his face. Lieutenant Speke was taken prisoner by the Isaaq forces but later managed to escape.

== Background causes ==
The roots of the conflict lay in Burton's disdain for the local Abban fees, which he found extortionate. Burton had also clashed with the Issa Musa tribe over camel hire costs, leading to further strain in relations with the Isaaq clans. Prior to the attack, Burton had been suspected of espionage by the local clans, and tensions were already high when Burton's camp encountered three horsemen from the Habr Awal clan on April 18, 1855. They falsely reported that a plot to seize Berbera had been hatched by Haji Sharmarke Ali Saleh.

== Possible involvement of the Senussiya Order ==
French explorer and geographer Henri Duveyrier suggested that the Senusiyya order, a Muslim Sufi order active in the region, have played a role in the attack.
