= Ahmed Farah Dualeh =

Ahmed Farah Dualeh (Somali: Axmed Faarax Ducaale, Arabic: أحمد فرح دعاله; b. 1946) is a Somali-Danish community worker and politician.

== Early life ==
Dualeh was born in 1946 in Ethiopia to a nomadic Somali family, who eventually ended up in the Italian-controlled Trust Territory of Somaliland. He was adopted by an Italian family whilst that portion of Somalia was under Italian administration.

In 1967, he received a scholarship to study at a maritime school in Esbjerg, Denmark, after which he attended the Navigation school in Copenhagen. In 1973, he began working for the shipping company A.P. Møller–Mærsk. He later moved to Aalborg and became a captain with Aalborg Portland. He also studied Law and Business administration, graduating with an MBA.

Additionally, Dualeh served as a representative for the Somali community in Scandinavia. He helped immigrant families adapt to their new surroundings in various cities and towns in the larger region.

== Return to Somalia ==
In 2012, as the Somali civil war continued, Dualeh was named by a group of Somali exiles as the president of Jubaland, consisting of the regions of Gedo, Middle Jubba and lower Jubba in southern Somalia. Dualeh's claim to the presidency was one of several made in the region at the time. Dualeh's attempts over four years to serve as president of the region were documented in the 2017 Danish film Præsidenten fra Nordvest (President from the Northwest).
