= Blockade of Berbera (1855–1856) =

Event in Berbera 1855

Date	1855–1856
Location	Berbera, Isaaq Sultanate
Result	Resolved by treaty

Belligerents
United Kingdom; East India Company	Isaaq Sultanate: Habr Awal

British forces blockaded the port city of Berbera in the Isaaq Sultanate from 1855 to 1856. It was the second British military action against the city after the 1827 attack on Berbera.

== Background ==
In April 1855, explorer Lieutenant Richard Burton had set out on his search for the source of the Nile and was encamped near Berbera. On 19 April, his camp was attacked and plundered.

Burton identified the attackers as three sub-tribes of the Hab Awal clan in a letter to Brigadier Coughlin, the British Resident at Aden, on 23 April 1855:

23 April 1855

R.F Burton to Colonel W. Coughlin

The BT. Resident

Aden, Arabia

Sir,

I have the honor of enclose a report from Lt. Herne & a statement from Lt. Speke concerning the melancholy occurrence of the 19th inst...

The people chiefly implicated in this outrage are the Mikahil, the Ayyal Ahmad & the Eesa Musa - all three sub tribes of the great clan, Habr Awal. The 2, however, are but little concerned. The Eesa Musa is the principal actor.

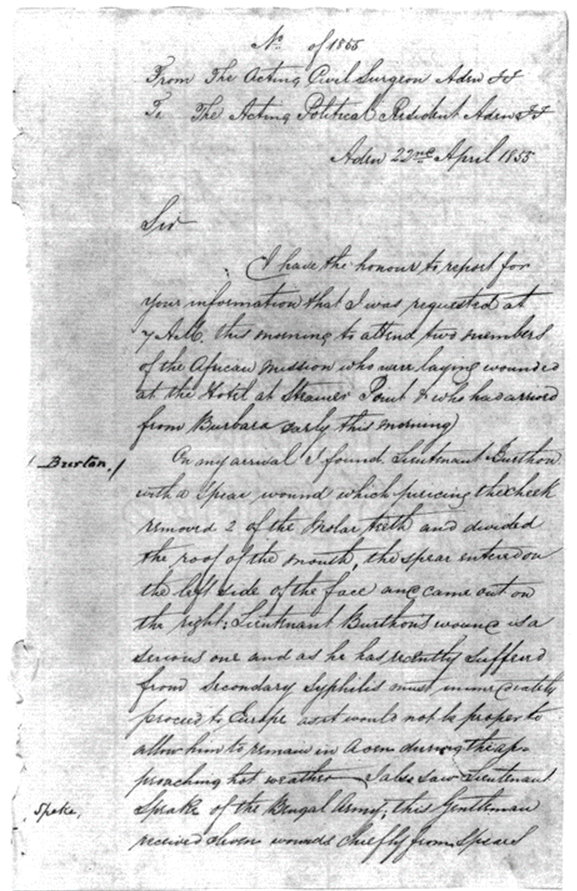
The report of the Civil Surgeon of Aden regarding the fatal event in Berbera.

According to Lieutenant John Hanning Speke, a surviving member of the attacked crew, the attackers were led by Ou Ali (Aw Cali). The prefix of Aw signifies Islamic importance in the Somali language.

Before the attack, Lieutenant Burton had vocally expressed his dislike of the Abban fees for the local Habr Awal clan. He had also resisted the caravan fees and the hire of camels by the Isa Musa tribe, which he regarded as extortionate. This had rendered Burton unpopular among the local Habr Awal in Berbera, and was therefore one of the major causes of the attack.

Burton had earlier disguised himself as an Arab merchant named "Haji Mirza Abdullah". However, he had still come under suspicion. On 1 January 1855, on his way to Harar with his camp, he encountered three men of the Habr Awal clan: Ali Hasan, Husayn Araleh and Haji Mohammed, who were highly respected by Emir Ahmad III ibn Abu-Bakr, the Emir of Harar. The three men reported to Burton's agent, Gerad Adan, that Burton was in the land only to spy on its wealth. Suspicion of Burton's camp was therefore already pronounced months before the attack.

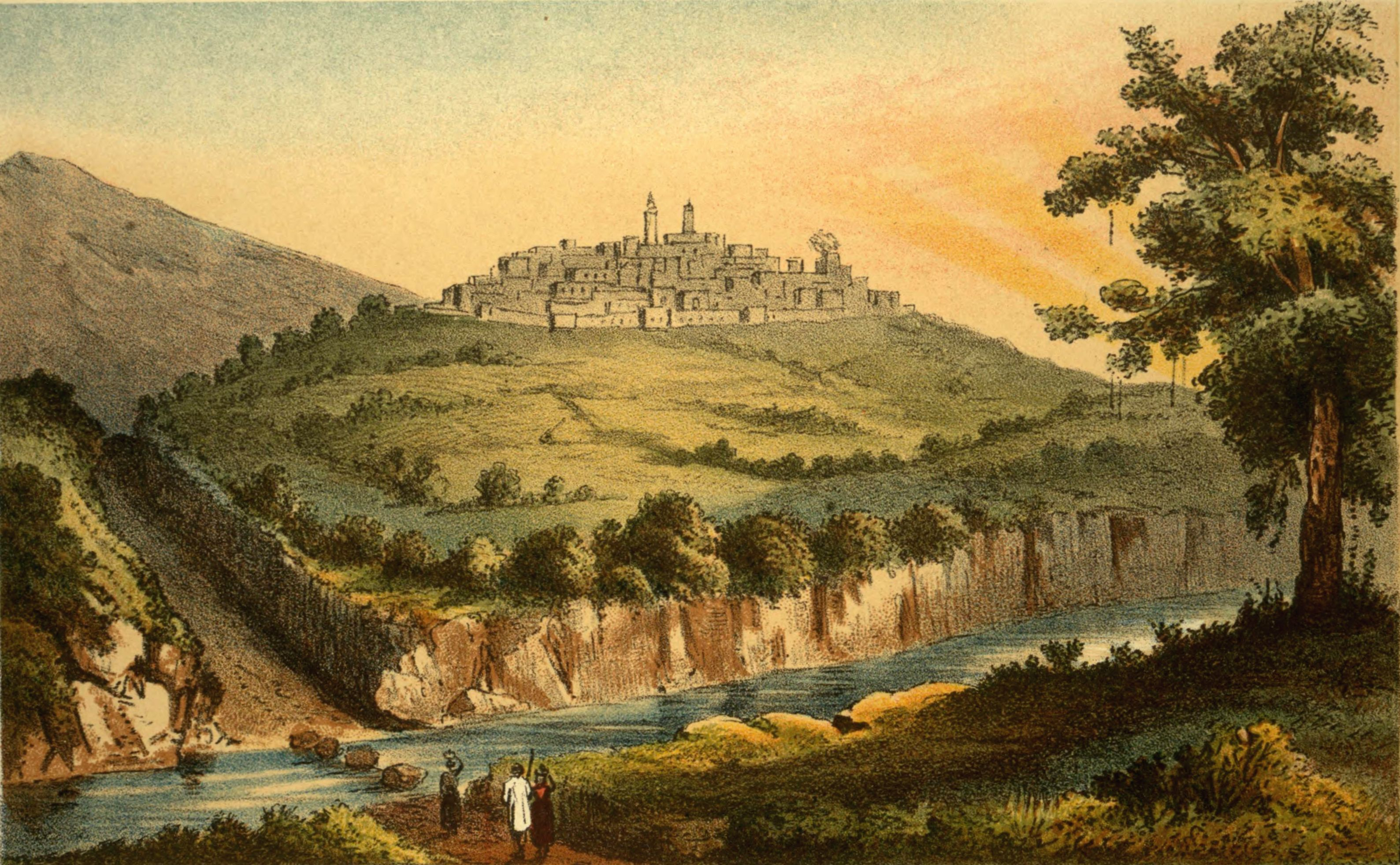
Harar in the 1800s.

On 18 April 1855, the day before the attack, Burton's camp was encountered by three horsemen, one of them Mohammed of the 'Isa Musa, another Dublay of the Ayal Ahmed, and the third unknown. Burton's camp had mistaken them for a foraging party and fired a warning shot over their heads. Burton sent the Ras Khafilah (caravan leader) to ask the horsemen what they were doing. The horsemen responded that the people of the coast had reported that Haji Sharmarke Ali Saleh planned to seize Berbera and that his vessels were docked in Siyara. However, this was a lie and Burton concluded that the horsemen were spies.

As claimed by French explorer and geographer Henri Duveyrier, the Senussiya order might have played a role in this event in Berbera in 1855.

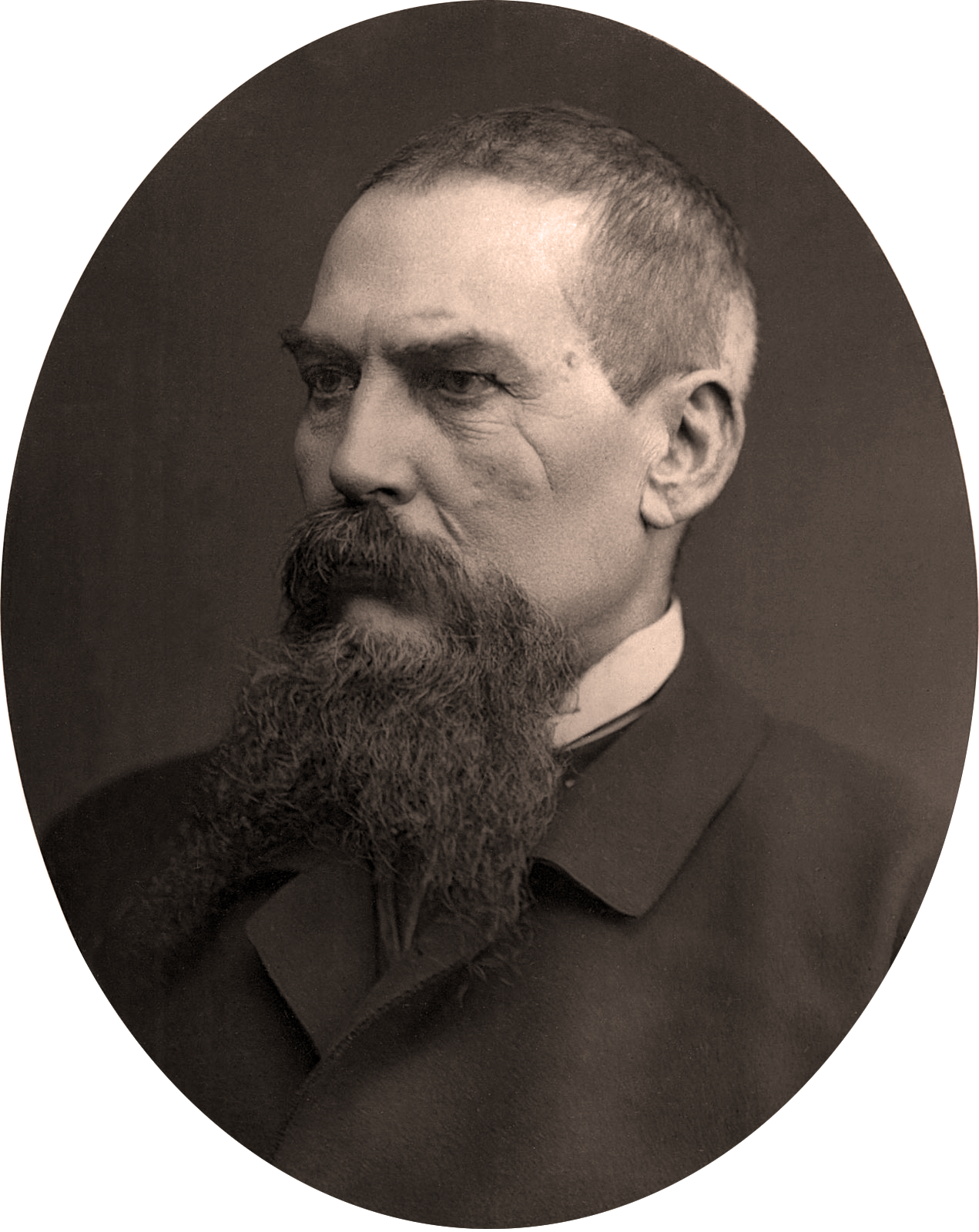
Richard Francis Burton, who was impaled in the attack. The point entering one cheek and exiting the other.

During the attack, the well-armed Somalis killed Lieutenant Stroyan, and wounded Burton. Lieutenant Speke was imprisoned but later on managed to escape.

== The blockade ==
The British, knowing that Berbera was economically important to the Habr Awal, decided to enforce a blockade between Jibal Elmas (Jebel Almis) and Siyara of modern-day Somaliland. The Habr Awal of Berbera believed at first that the blockade would affect not only the trade in Berbera, but also Aden, and would therefore harm the British as well. However, they were mistaken, since the trade found an outlet in different locations.

The British blockaded the port of Berbera to force the Sheikhs of Habr Awal to surrender the assailants implicated in the murder of Stroyan. However, the Sheikhs did not surrender Ou Ali who found shelter among the 'Isa Musa sept.

The blockade ceased on 9 November 1856 following a treaty that was signed between the British East India Company and the Sheikhs of the Habr Awal, Ishaaq. This was signed in the presence of Captain H. L. Playfair, the assistant political resident in Aden. This treaty's six articles secured the economic and commercial interests of both parties. However, it debarred the 'Isa Musa clan family and their goods from Aden due to their refusal to hand over the main assailant of the attack, Ou Ali. The 'Isa Musa did not engage in the treaty themselves. The treaty further bound the merchants in Berbera to abolish the slave trade.

== Aftermath ==
Despite the treaty, neither Burton nor Speke ever returned to Somaliland, and the dangers and the costs put off new British expeditions in the region until the 1880s.

=== Proposed recognition of the Habr Awal ===
The Political Resident of Aden, Brigadier William Marcus Coghlan, wished to include formal political recognition of the independence of the Habr Awal Sheikhdom as the sovereign body controlling Berbera and its commerce separate from the larger Isaaqs. However, due to uncertainties regarding the Bombay government and Somalis, the proposal never came to fruition.
