= Ahmed Haji Dualeh =

Summary of life of deceased Somali politician

Ahmed Haji Dualeh Abdalla
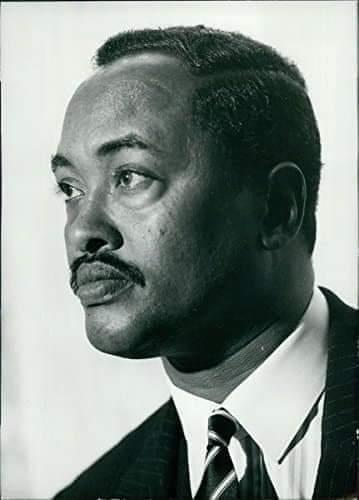
- Dualeh in the 1960s

Minister of Agriculture of Somalia
- In office 1960–1962
- Preceded by: (office established)

Somali Ambassador to West Germany
- In office 1962–1964

Somali Ambassador to Egypt
- In office 1964–1968

Somali Ambassador to Yemen
- In office 1968–1970

Somali Ambassador to the United Kingdom
- In office 1970–1975

Personal details
- Born: 1928 Burao, British Somaliland
- Died: January 8, 2020 (aged 91–92) Tucson, Arizona, United States
- Children: Harbi, Karima, Khadra, Nura, Ayanle
- Relatives: Raqiya Haji Dualeh Abdalla (sister)
- Occupation: Politician, diplomat

Ahmed Haji Dualeh Abdalla; 1928 – January 8, 2020), was an independence activist, politician, and diplomat from Somalia.

== Early life and education ==
Ahmed Haji Dualeh was born in Burao, British Somaliland, in 1928.

In 1948, Dualeh and three colleagues won competitive scholarships to Hantoub College in Khartoum, Sudan. After four years of study, he continued on scholarship to England, enrolling at the University of Keele in northern England. In the summer of 1956 he graduated with a First-Class Honours degree in Economics — making him, according to contemporaneous accounts, the first university graduate from Somaliland.

== Career in British Somaliland ==
Upon returning to Somaliland in 1956, Dualeh was appointed as an Assistant District Commissioner — the highest post available to a Somali in the colonial administration. After colonial authorities discovered his clandestine involvement in the Somali liberation movement, he was transferred to Las Anod (Laascaanood), the capital of the eastern Sool region.

Following a physical confrontation with a British district commissioner over the latter's treatment of local nomadic populations, Dualeh was recalled to Hargeisa under armed escort, facing a charge of sedition. He evaded arrest by crossing the border into Ethiopia, where Emperor Haile Selassie granted him political asylum and offered him a senior post at the Ethiopian Ministry of the Interior.

== Independence movement ==
After roughly four years in exile, Dualeh returned to Somaliland in early 1959.

In the 1960 British Somaliland parliamentary election, Dualeh was elected as a Member of Parliament (MP), becoming one of the founding 33 members of the Somaliland Legislative Council. He was also a member of the Somaliland delegation to the Somaliland Protectorate Constitutional Conference held in London in May 1960, at which the date of June 26 was agreed for Somaliland's independence.

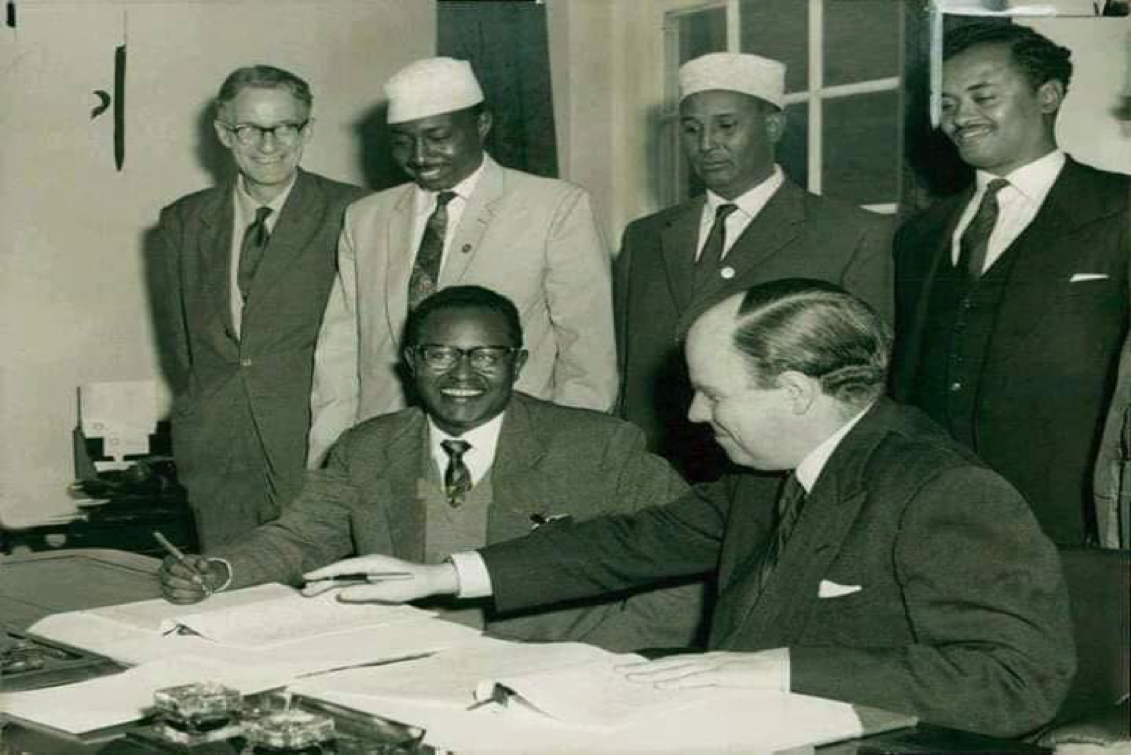
The Somaliland Protectorate Constitutional Conference, London, May 1960 in which it was decided that 26 June would be the day of Independence, and so signed on 12 May 1960. Somaliland Delegation: Mohamed Haji Ibrahim Egal, Ahmed Haji Dualeh, Ali Garad Jama and Haji Ibrahim Nur. From the Colonial Office: Ian Macleod, Douglas Hall, 14th Baronet, H. C. F. Wilks (Secretary)

Somaliland declared its independence on June 26, 1960, and was recognized by 35 countries, including all permanent members of the UN Security Council. Five days later, Somaliland united with Italian Somalia (which declared independence on July 1, 1960) to form the Somali Republic.

== Minister of Agriculture (1960–1962) ==
Upon the formation of the first government of the Somali Republic — with Mohamed Ibrahim Egal as Prime Minister and Abdirashid Ali Sharmarke as a senior figure — Dualeh was appointed Minister of Agriculture.

As minister, Dualeh introduced sweeping reforms to Somali agriculture. He dismantled the feudal land system in the south by which Italian settlers and influential Somali politicians had monopolized the profitable banana export trade to Italy.

== Diplomatic career ==
After leaving parliament in 1962, Dualeh embarked on a career as a diplomat.

=== Ambassador to West Germany (1962–1964) ===
As Ambassador to West Germany, Dualeh successfully negotiated West German development aid for Somalia. Notably, he insisted that a German-funded technical institute be established in Burao rather than in Mogadishu, arguing for the importance of distributing development projects across the country rather than concentrating them in the capital.

=== Ambassador to Egypt (1964–1968) ===
In 1964, Dualeh was transferred to Cairo. Somalia–Egypt relations were strained at the time due to President Aden Adde's perceived alignment with Saudi Arabia, the rival of Egyptian President Gamal Abdel Nasser.

=== Ambassador to Yemen (1968–1970) ===
Dualeh served as Ambassador in Aden from 1968, representing Somalia during the period of the People's Democratic Republic of Yemen.

=== Ambassador to the United Kingdom (1970–1975) ===
In 1970, the newly established military government of Siad Barre assigned Dualeh to London. He served as Ambassador to the UK until 1975, working to stabilize diplomatic relations.

== Later life ==
From 1976 to 1979, Dualeh served as a director of the newly established Islamic Development Bank in Jeddah, Saudi Arabia. He subsequently joined the private sector as a director of the Boqshan Group of Companies, remaining in that role until 2003, when he emigrated to the United States.

He died in Tucson, Arizona, on January 8, 2020, at the age of approximately 91–92.

== Tributes and legacy ==
Following Dualeh's death, Somali President Mohamed Abdullahi Mohamed (Farmaajo) led the nation in mourning, describing him as a patriot devoted to the "unity of his country and its people." The Ministry of Foreign Affairs (Somalia) held a formal memorial ceremony in Mogadishu on January 12, 2020. Somalia's Foreign Minister Amb. Ahmed Isse Awad described him as a "brilliant diplomat" who was "one of the four Somali freedom fighters who united the northern region with the south after their independence from the British and Italian colonialists."

The President of Somaliland, Muse Bihi Abdi, also sent condolences to the nation and the family.

== See also ==
- History of Somalia
- History of Somaliland
- British Somaliland
- Somali Republic
- Khadra Ahmed Dualeh
- Raqiya Haji Dualeh Abdalla
