= British attack on Berbera (1827) =

Naval battle in modern-day Somaliland

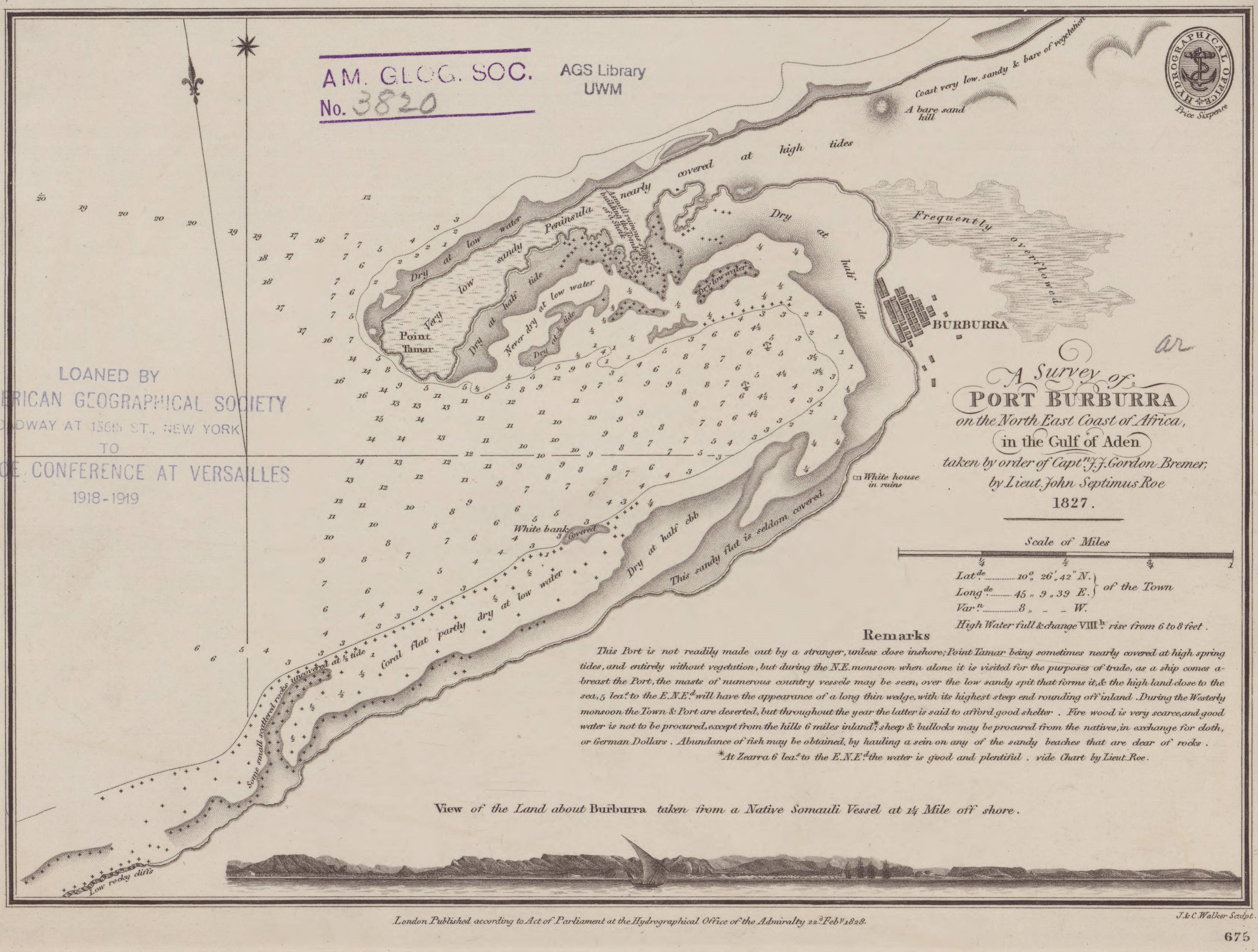
- An 1827 admiralty chart of Berbera
Date	January 10–11, 1827
Location	Berbera, Isaaq Sultanate (now Somaliland) 10°26′08″N 045°00′59″E
Result	British victory

Belligerents
United Kingdom; East India Company	Isaaq Sultanate: Habr Awal

Commanders and leaders
(United Kingdom of Great Britain and Ireland) Gordon Bremer (United Kingdom of Great Britain and Ireland) W. C. Jervoise (East India Company) C. J. Maillard	Farah Guled

Units involved
Royal Marines and Indian sepoys	Somali warriors

Strength
250 men with 2 corvettes and 1 sloop	2,000–2,500 men and several buggalows

Casualties and losses
1 killed	Unknown
- Location within Somaliland Berbera (Horn of Africa)

The British attack on Berbera was an engagement of the Royal Navy and East India Company against the isaaq clan on January 10–11, 1827. It was the culmination of previous British punitive expeditions against the Habr Awal.

== Background ==
When a British vessel named the Mary Anne attempted to dock in Berbera's port in 1825 the ship was plundered and burnt with two crew members killed and another wounded. Sharmarke Ali, a sheikh of Berbera, rescued the survivors.

In response the Royal Navy enforced a blockade and some accounts narrate an immediate bombardment of the city. Berbera was one of the premier ports of the Gulf of Aden and did significant trade with the Harar in the interior and merchants from across the western Indian Ocean would come trade at the town. The blockade would last until 1827 when a Royal Navy expedition led by Captain W.C Jervoise was sent to Berbera.

The British expedition was a squadron of two Conway-class corvettes and one sloop with HMS Tamar, HMS Pandora and HMS Amherst involved. HMS Tamar and HMS Pandora belonged to the Royal Navy and HMS Amherst was a ship of the East India Company. After departing from Mocha HMS Tamar and HMS Pandora were joined by HMS Amherst and would arrive in Berbera on 10 January and opened fire on a number of Somali buggalows in the harbour with all escaping unharmed. After this initial bombardment Captain James Gordon Bremer sent a delegation on shore led by Lieutenant John Downey to the Sheikhs of the Habr Awal and expressed his desire to speak to them regarding the 1825 attack on the Mary Anne, in which they agreed to meet the following morning.

== Battle ==
On the night of January 10 Captain Bremer had sounded the harbour and concluded that it was excellent, and the squadron would move in and weigh anchor in the bay of Berbera the following morning. Upon the approach of the British ships into the bay the Habr Awal set fire to the city and began to plunder the goods of the visiting Banyan merchants who were British subjects. In response the squadron opened fire deliberately aiming above the crowds in order to intimidate rather than kill them. Under Captain Jervoise of HMS Pandora a contingent of 250 Royal Marines and Indian sepoys were deployed from HMS Amherst and landed. They faced up to 2,000-2,500 Somalis who quickly dispersed in the face of their well-armed opponents. In the ensuing chaos Captain Jervoise moved to occupy the centre of Berbera on a ridge and a division led by Lieutenant Jeffrey Noble was attacked with one Royal Marine dying and several other losses being incurred. The ships ceased their bombardment after Jervoise's capture and the fires were gradually put out. The Somalis would surrender in small parties and eventually negotiations would restart.

== Aftermath ==
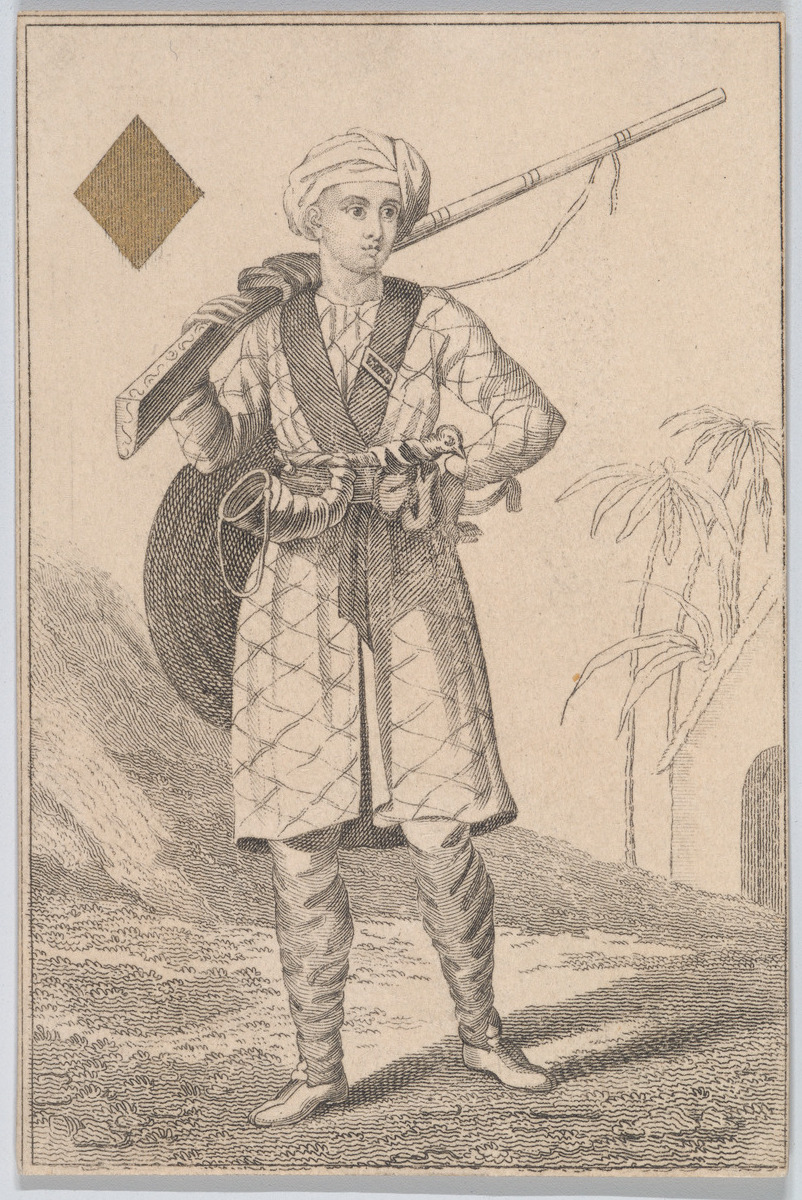
A Sepoy soldier

Following the battle the Sheikhs of the Habr Awal requested several days to gather other notables who were several days away from Berbera before an agreement could be concluded. The British initially insisted on 30,000 Spanish Dollars but upon the Sheikhs stating the fires in Berbera had cost the Habr Awal a significant amount of losses, agreed on an indemnity of 15,000 dollars to be paid in over three years in installments. The treaty settled the 1825 attack on the Mary Anne and gave the British the ability to trade safely in Berbera, and all ships flying the Union Jack would be afforded the same rights.

=== Letter to Saqr Al Qassimi ===
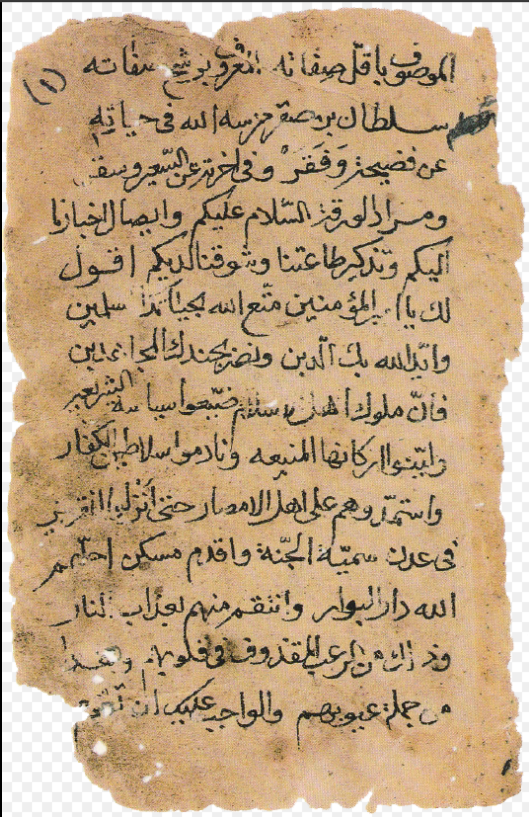
Letter by Isaaq Sultan

The Isaaq Sultan Farah Guled and Haji Ali penned a letter to Sultan bin Saqr Al Qasimi of Ras Al Khaimah in the 1830s requesting military assistance and joint religious war against the British. Alongside their stronghold in the Persian Gulf and Gulf of Oman the Qasimi were very active both militarily and economically in the Gulf of Aden and were given to plunder and attack ships as far west as the Mocha on the Red Sea. They had numerous commercial ties with the Somalis, leading vessels from Ras Al Khaimah and the Persian Gulf to regularly attend trade fairs in the large ports of Berbera and Zeila and were very familiar with the Isaaq.

== See also ==
- Royal Navy
- Berbera
- Habr Awal
- Isaaq Sultanate
