= IPRT =

IPRT may refer to:

- Independent Pricing and Regulatory Tribunal, an Australian regulatory agency
- Industrial platinum resistance thermometer
- Institute for Practical Research and Training, a Somali non-government organization
- Institute of Physical Research and Technology at Iowa State University
- Internationale Packet Radio Tagung, a German packet radio conference
- IPrint.com, NASAQ symbol IPRT
- Irish Penal Reform Trust, a group campaigning for change in prisons in Ireland
