= National Museum of Somaliland =

Museum in Hargeisa, Somaliland

- Madxafka Qaranka Somaliland المتحف الوطني صوماليلاندي

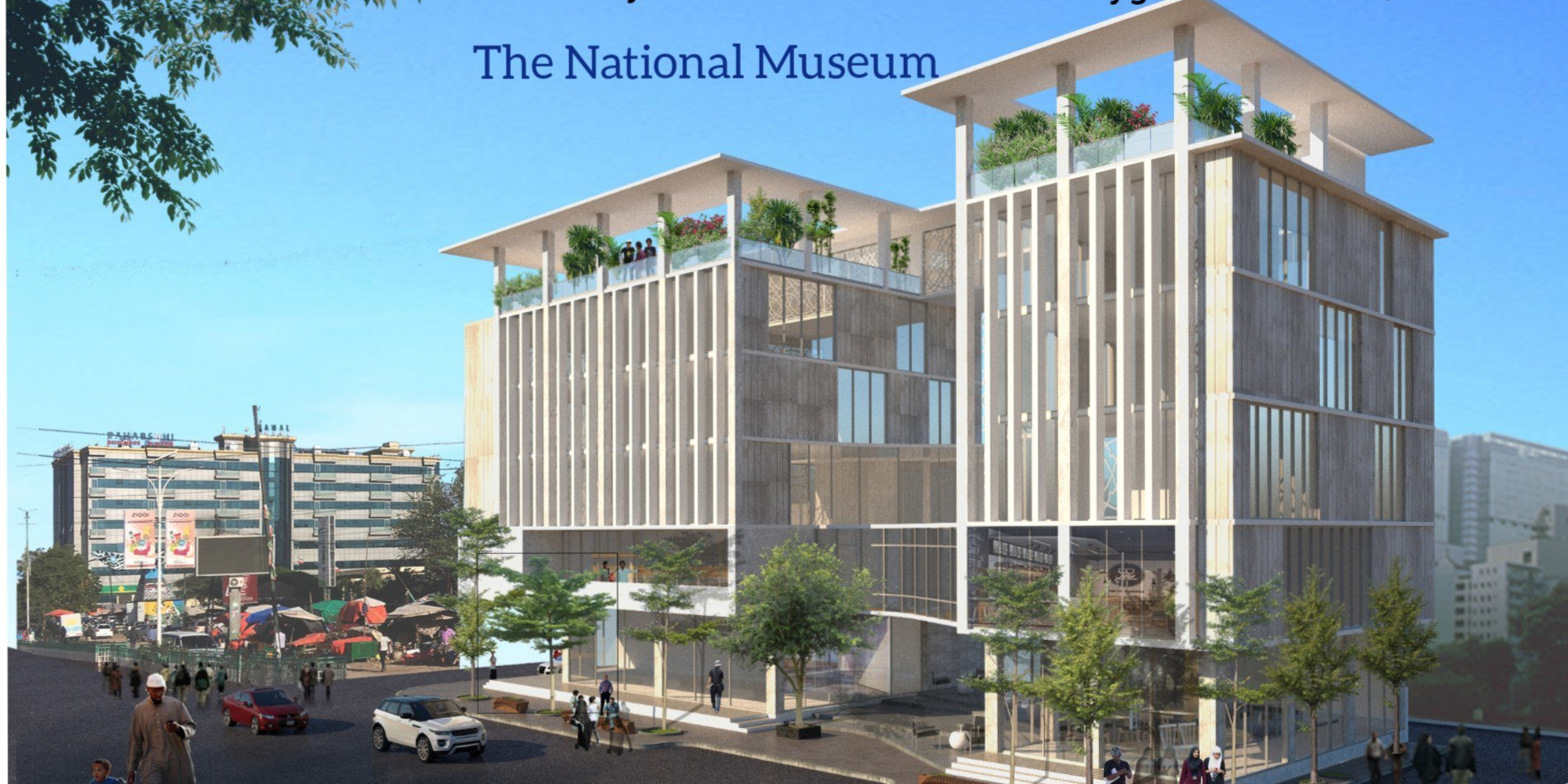
- Interactive map of the National Museum of Somaliland area

General information
- Classification: Museum
- Location: Hargeisa, Somaliland, 26 June Street - Ex Khairia Building; 26 June District
- Coordinates: 9.561507°N 44.066059°E
- Construction started: 2019
- Inaugurated: 29 July 2024
- Client: Board of Public Building
- Owner: Government of Somaliland

Design and construction
- Architect: Rashid Ali
- Architecture firm: Rio Architects Somaliland

Website
- somalilandmuseum.com

The National Museum of Somaliland (Somali: Madxafka Qaranka Hadrawi, Arabic: المتحف الوطني صوماليلاندي) is a national museum in Hargeisa, the capital of Somaliland.

The National Museum was opened and was inaugurated by president Muse Bihi Abdi on 29 July 2024.

== Gallery ==
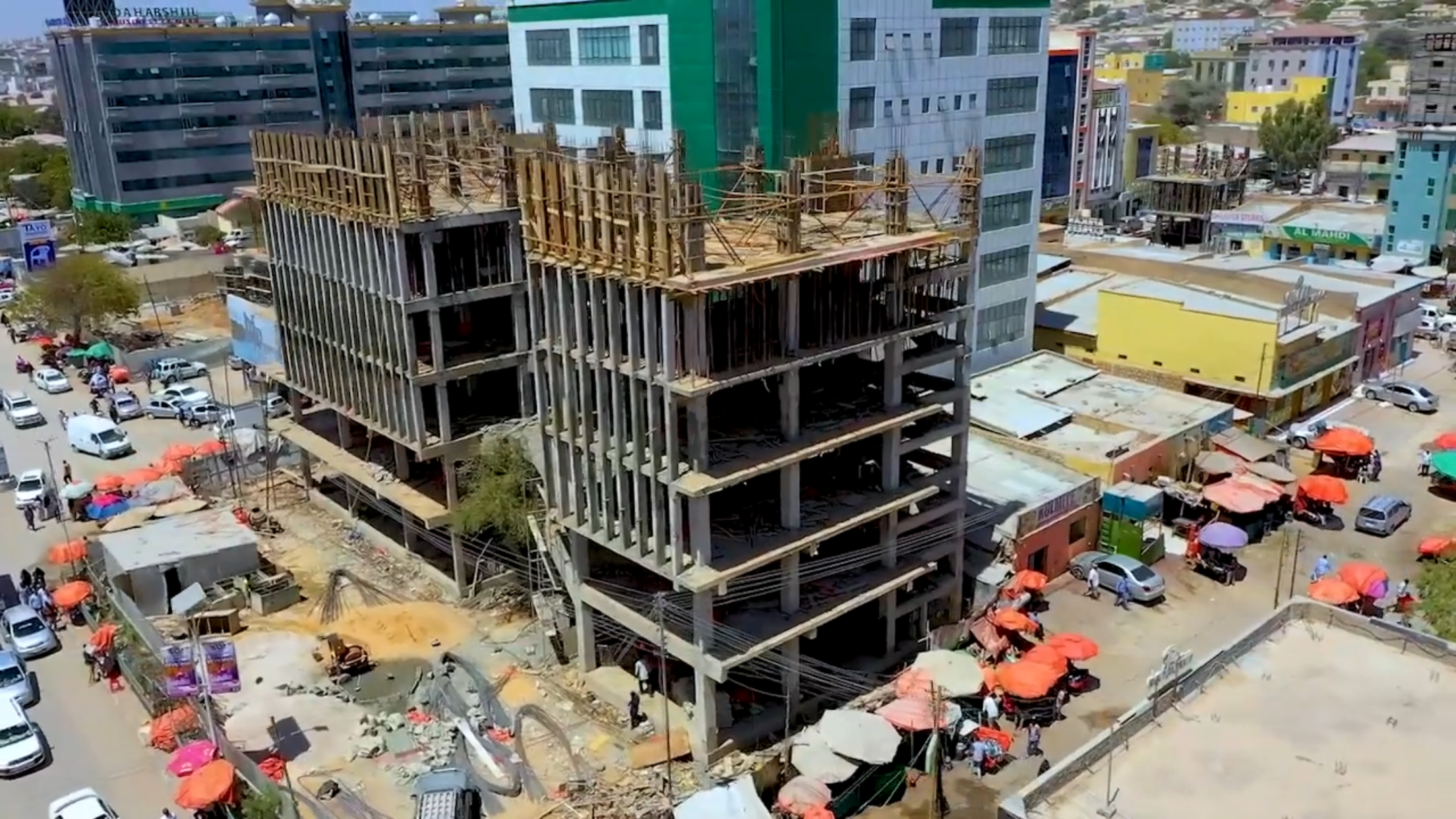
Construction site in 2021.

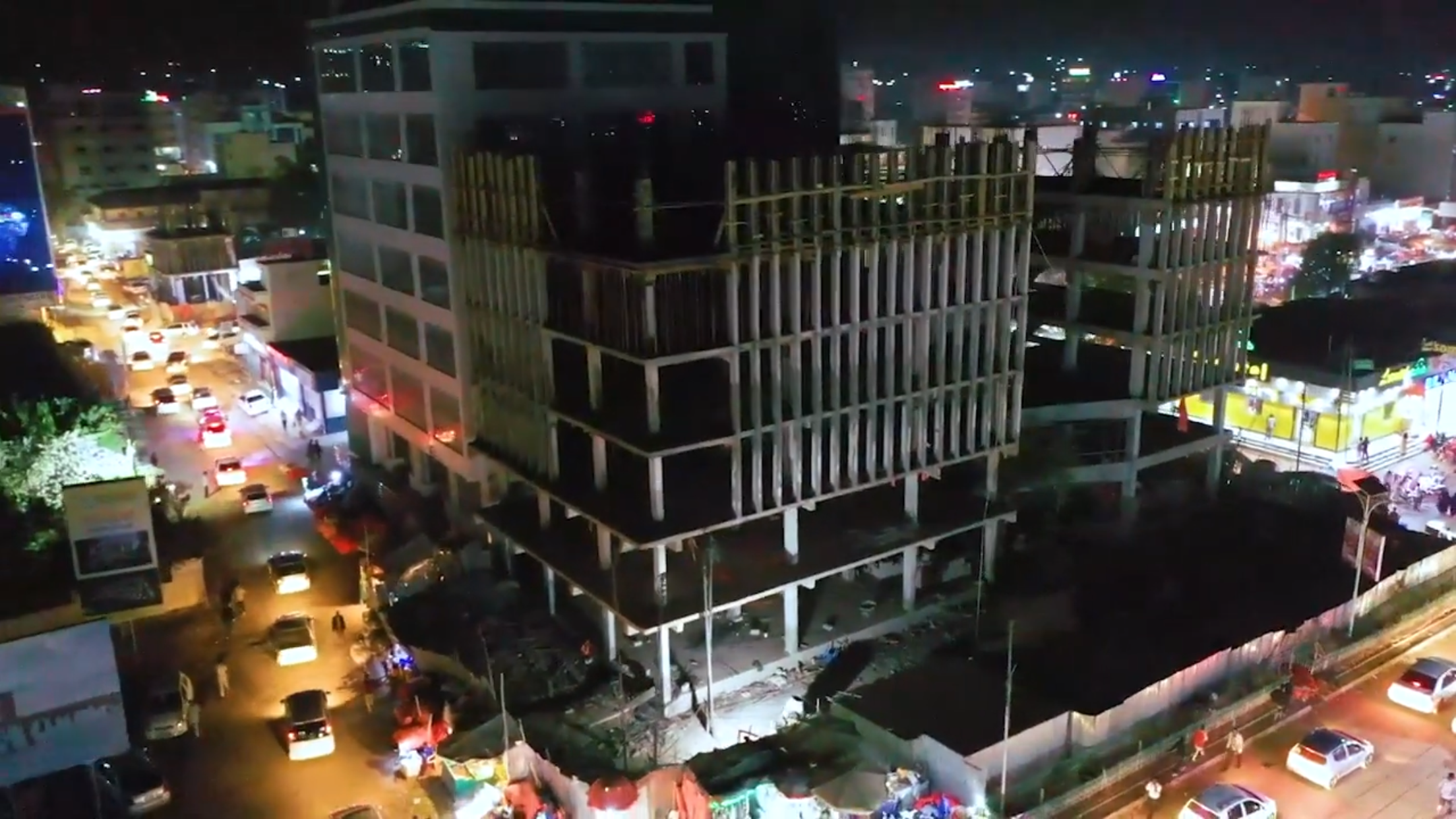
Construction site at night in 2021.

== See also ==
- Hargeisa
- List of museums in Somaliland
