= Mohamed Moge District =

Mohamed Moge District Degmada Maxamed Mooge
- District
- Country: Somaliland
- City: Hargeisa
- Time zone: UTC+3 (EAT)

Mohamed Moge District (Somali: Degmada Maxamed Mooge) is a district in eastern Hargeisa, Somaliland. It is one of the eight administrative districts of Hargeisa City. and is named after the famous singer Mohamed Moge Liban.
