= Ahmed Moallim Haruun District =

Ahmed Moallim Haruun District Degmada Axmed Macallin Haaruun
- District
- Country: Somaliland
- City: Hargeisa
- Time zone: UTC+3 (EAT)

Ahmed Moallim Haruun District (Somali: Degmada Axmed Macallin Haaruun) is a district in Hargeisa, Somaliland. It is one of the eight administrative districts of Hargeisa City.

== See also ==
- Administrative divisions of Somaliland
- Regions of Somaliland
- Districts of Somaliland
