= Hope University =

University in Hargeisa, Somaliland

Hope University (HU)
- Jaamacadda Hope جامعة الرجاء
- Type: Public
- Established: 2008
- President: Mr Mohamed Y. Osman (Acting President)
- Location: Hargeisa, Somaliland
- Website: www.hope-university.com

Hope University (HU) is a national not-for-profit, cost recovering higher education establishment in Hargeisa, the capital of Somaliland. It was founded in 2008 by Najib Sheikh Abdulkarim. The institution aims to provide affordable higher learning opportunities in the fields of health, technology and management sciences.
