= 31 May District =

31 May District Degmada 31 May
- District
- Interactive map of 31 May District
- Coordinates: 9.538°N 44.040°E
- Country: Somaliland
- City: Hargeisa
- Time zone: UTC+3 (EAT)

31 May District (Somali: Degmada 31 May) is a district in Hargeisa, Somaliland. It is one of the eight administrative districts of Hargeisa City.

May 31 is the date that the Somali National Movement liberated Hargeisa during its 1988 offensive.

== See also ==
- Administrative divisions of Somaliland
- Regions of Somaliland
- Districts of Somaliland
