= Hargeisa Provincial Museum =

Museum in Hargeisa, Somaliland

- Established: 1977
- Dissolved: 1988
- Location: Hargeisa, Somaliland
- Coordinates: 9.561944°N 44.0725°E

The Hargeisa Provincial Museum (HPM) was established in 1977 in Hargeisa, situated in the Maroodi Jeex region in Somaliland. It was the first museum to be established in the country since independence in 1960.

== Establishment ==
In the mid-1970s, a strong cultural movement arose in Hargeisa. This movement was the driving force behind the establishment of the museum. The museum was a part of a cultural center in the city that consisted of a theater, a library and a provincial museum. The building consisted of two concentric rings with a meeting area and temporary exhibit room. The circular building in the center was inspired by the "mundul" which is a traditional hut used by Somali farmers. The museum was 650 m^{2} large and was designed and built by a local contractor, Osman Dahir Adan.

== Collection ==
When the museum was opened in 1977, it had an ethnographic exhibition, most of the parts for which had been donated by the residents of Hargeisa. The items where displayed in two 20 meters long cabinets without any glass, one in each of the halls. There were only two attendants, the gardener and a cleaning woman and both the collection and building soon started to deteriorate. Renovating was started in 1981. The two large showcases where dismantled and 23 smaller cases with glass were built. Netting was installed in front of the windows, the building repainted and the collection was cleaned. Original it had been around 4,000 items on display. However, the new exhibition was reduced to around 1.400 items, with the rest was put into storage. A special display was made for firearms used by Sayyid Mohammed Abdullah Hassan and his men between 1901 and 1921.

== Destruction ==
The museum was completely destroyed due to the Isaaq genocide in 1988.

== Reconstruction ==
Reconstruction is taking place on the building and is set to be completed in 2012.

== See also ==
- List of museums in Somaliland
