= 26 June District =

26 June District Degmada 26 June
- District
- Interactive map of 26 June District
- Coordinates: 9.573°N 44.050°E
- Country: Somaliland
- City: Hargeisa
- Time zone: UTC+3 (EAT)

26 June District (Somali: Degmada 26 June) is a district in Hargeisa, Somaliland. 26 June District is one of the main administrative districts of Hargeisa. It is among the eight districts that make up the city and plays an important role in the political, economic, and social life of the capital. The district is an urban area that contains residential neighborhoods, government offices, markets, schools, and various businesses. Because of its central location within Hargeisa, it is a busy district where many daily commercial and administrative activities take place. Hargeisa City. June 26 is the date of independence of British Somaliland as the State of Somaliland in 1960.

Situated in it are Radio Hargeisa, and the Gobonimo Market.

Education

26 June District has primary and secondary schools serving the local population. Education in the district follows the Somaliland national curriculum.

Population

The district has a growing urban population as part of the wider expansion of Hargeisa city.

Health services

26 June District has access to basic healthcare services, including clinics and health centers. A Mother and Child Health (MCH) center in the district provides essential medical care.

Infrastructure 26 June District includes residential buildings, government offices, and public infrastructure. It is also home to cultural institutions such as the National Museum of Somaliland, located in the district on 26 June Street, which contributes to the cultural development of Hargeisa.

Security

The district is served by local police forces responsible for maintaining law and order. Security services help ensure public safety and support daily activities in the area.

== See also ==
- Administrative divisions of Somaliland
- Regions of Somaliland
- Districts of Somaliland
