= List of museums in Somaliland =

This is a list of museums in Somaliland.

== Museums ==
- National Museum of Somaliland
- Hargeisa Provincial Museum
- Saryan Museum

== See also ==
- List of museums

== See also ==
- McMahon, Kathryn (1988). "The Hargeisa Provincial Museum". African Arts. 21 (3): 64–68, 87–88. doi:10.2307/3336446. JSTOR 3336446.
