= Gacan Libaax District =

Gaan Libah District Degmada Gacan Libaax
- District
- Country: Somaliland
- City: Hargeisa
- Time zone: UTC+3 (EAT)

Gaan Libah District (Somali: Degmada Gacan Libaax) is a district in Hargeisa, Somaliland. It is one of the eight administrative districts of Hargeisa City.

== See also ==
- Administrative divisions of Somaliland
- Regions of Somaliland
- Districts of Somaliland
