= IPrint.com =

NASAQ symbol IPRT

iPrint.com was a venture-backed start-up and one of the original e-commerce websites. Launched in 1996 by four co-founders, iPrint offered one of the first WYSIWYG design engines for the Web. The company debuted on the NASDAQ (symbol IPRT) in March 2000, and was subsequently delisted in 2002.

== History ==
iPrint was started by four co-founders, Royal Farros, Dave Hodson, Mike Rubin and Letty Swank in May, 1996. The website went live for business on December 27, 1996.

iPrint started as one of the first companies in The Enterprise Network (TEN) startup incubator housed at NASA Ames Research Center in Mountain View, California.

The first institutional round of venture capital financing was led by Mark Dubovoy of Leapfrog Ventures. The second round of investment was led by Deepak Kamra of Canaan Ventures and Intel Ventures which closed March, 1998.

iPrint merged with promotional products firm Wood Associates in 2001, and was itself acquired by Harland Clarke in 2009.

== Award ==
iPrint.com was awarded the honor for Business Excellence by Webmaster Magazine, August 1997.
