= Institute for Practical Research and Training =

Institute for Practical Research and Training (IPRT)
- Established: 1998
- Director: Ahmed Hussein Esa
- Location: Hargeisa, Somaliland
- Website: http://www.iprt.org

The Institute for Practical Research and Training (IPRT) is a non-governmental organization based in Hargeisa, Somaliland/Somalia that specializes in (applied) research and training.
