= Hargeisa =

Capital and most populous city of Somaliland

Hargeisa Hargeysa (Somali) هرجيسا (Arabic)
- Capital city
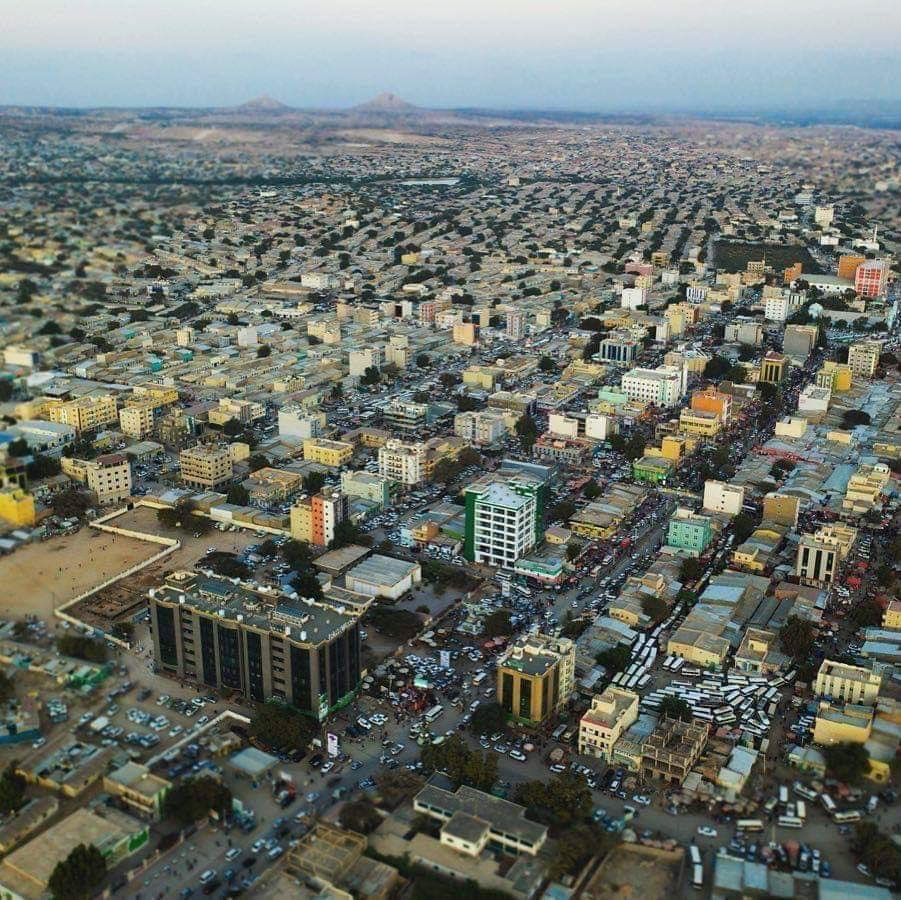
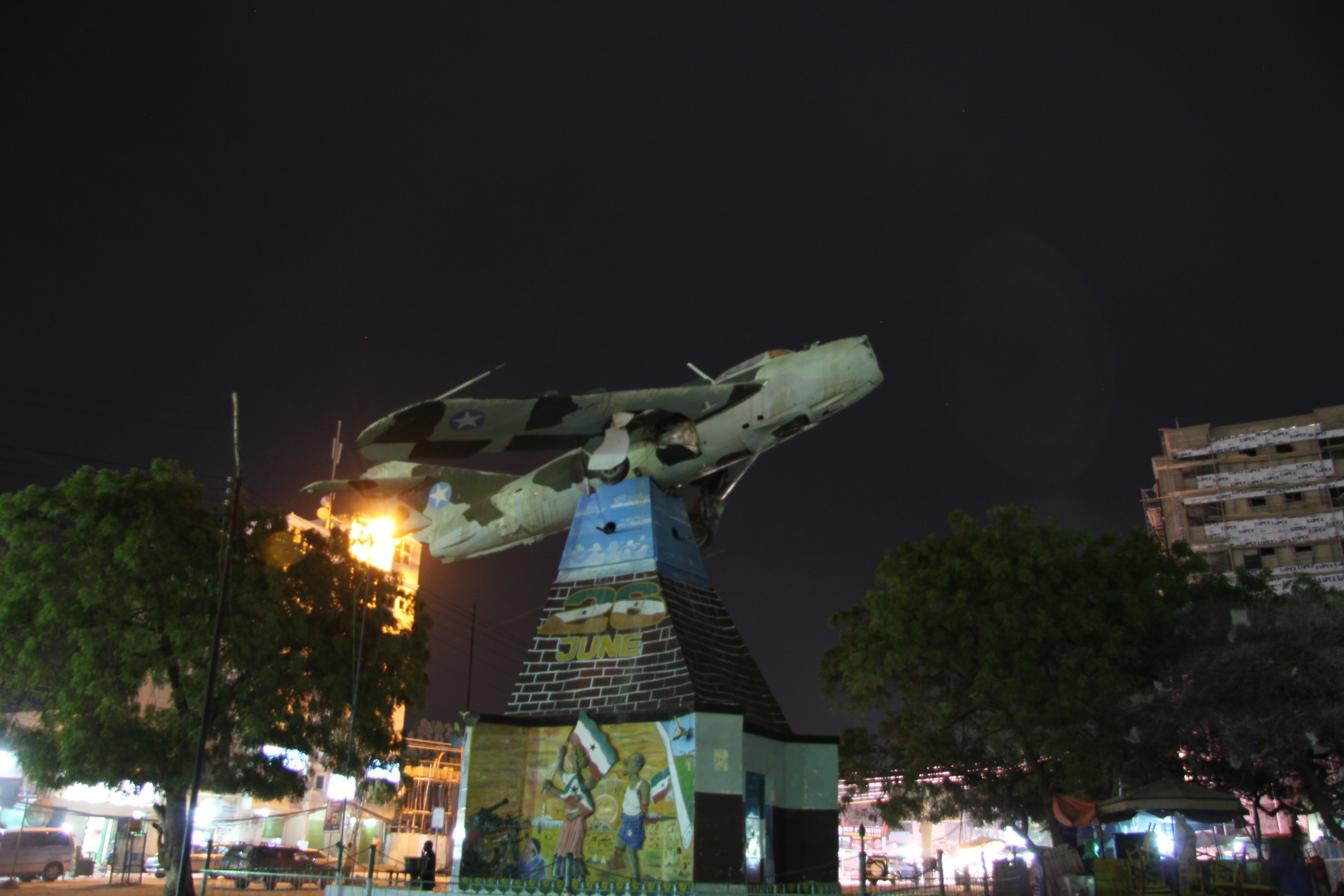
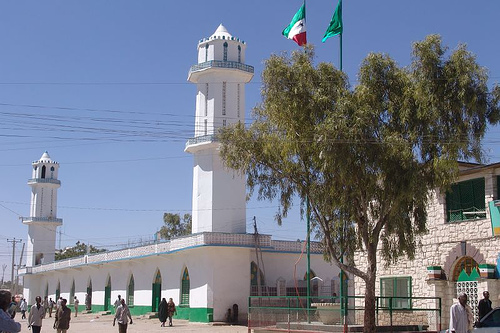
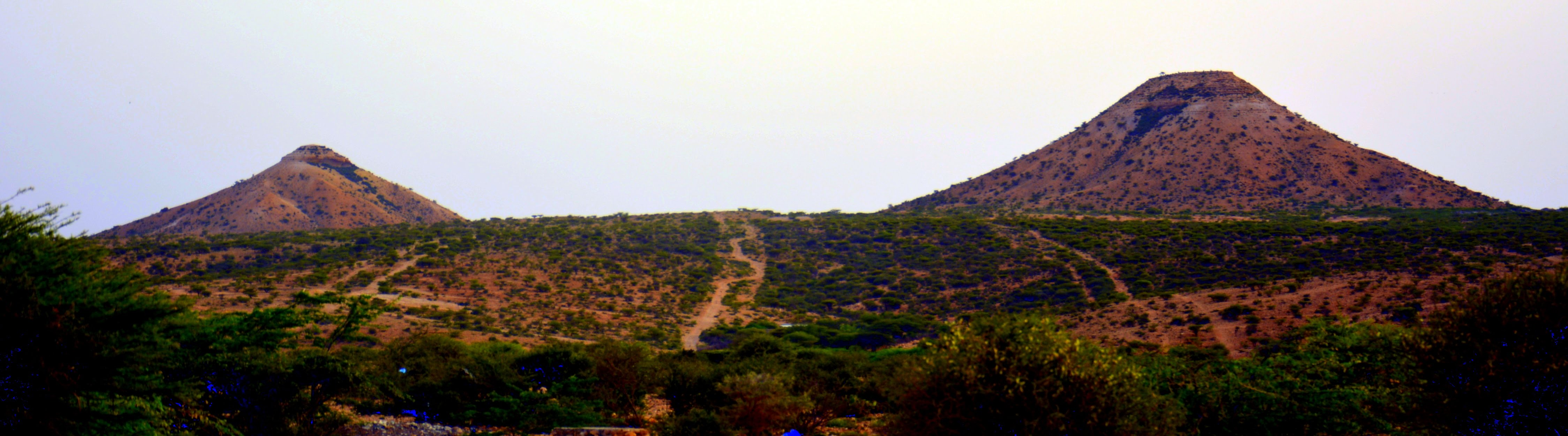
- Drone view of Hargeisa, Hargeisa downtown, Hargeisa, Jama Mosque, Naasa Hablood

- Flag Local council seal of Hargeisa

- Location in Somaliland Location in Africa
- Coordinates: 9°33′40″N 44°04′00″E
- Country: Somaliland
- Region: Maroodi Jeh
- District: Hargeisa District

Government
  - Mayor: Abdikarim Ahmed Mooge

Area
  - Total: 140 km^{2} (54 sq mi)
- Elevation: 1,334 m (4,377 ft)

Population (2019)
  - Total: 1,200,000
  - Rank: 1st
  - Density: 1,600/km^{2} (4,100/sq mi)
- Demonym(s): Hargeysaawi; Arabic: هرجيساوي
- Time zone: UTC+3 (EAT)
- Area code: +252
- Website: dhhgov.org

Hargeisa (/hɑːrˈɡeɪsə/ har-GAY-sə; Somali: Hargeysa; Arabic: هرجيسا, romanized: Harjīsā) is the capital and largest city of the Republic of Somaliland, a partially recognised sovereign state in the Horn of Africa, still considered internationally to be part of Somalia. It is also the regional capital of the Maroodi Jeex region of Somaliland.

Hargeisa was founded as a watering and trading stop between the coast and the interior by the Isaaq. Initially it served as a watering well for the vast livestock of the Isaaq clan that inhabited that specific region and later were joined by other Isaaq clans that currently inhabit Hargeisa. In 1960, the Somaliland Protectorate gained independence from the United Kingdom and as scheduled united days later with the Trust Territory of Somaliland (former Italian Somaliland) to form the Somali Republic on 1 July. Up to 90% of the city was destroyed during the Isaaq genocide, a state-sponsored campaign of violence during the Somaliland War of Independence.

Hargeisa is situated in a valley in the Galgodon (Ogo) highlands, and sits at an elevation of 1,334 m (4,377 ft). Home to rock art from the Neolithic period, the city is also a commercial hub for precious stone-cutting, construction, retail services and trading, among other activities.

== Etymology ==
The town evolved in the latter half of the 1800s as a Qadiriyya settlement established by Sheikh Madar, near a water-stop used by nomadic stock-herders on the way to the town of Harar. It proposes a possible derivation of the name "Hargeisa" from the sobriquet Harar as-sagir, meaning "Harar the little" According to historian Norman Bennett, Madar named the settlement Hargeisa or Little Harar since he aspired for it to emulate the city of Harar as a center for Islamic teachings. Another etymological root for Hargeisa's name derives from the town's connection to the skins trade. Hargeisa has been a watering and trading stop between the coast and the interior, and chief amongst the goods traded were the hide skins procured from the interior to be processed in the settlement. In this etymological version, 'Hargeisa' is derived from hargageys, which means "place to sell hides and skins" in Somali.

== History ==
=== Prehistory ===
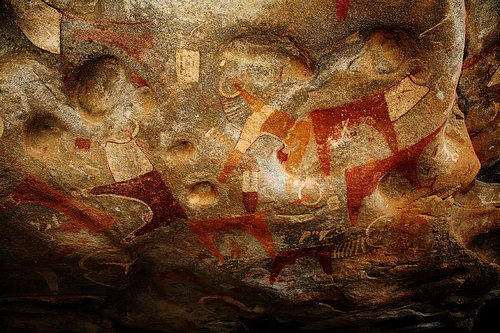
Rock art from the Laas Geel complex on the outskirts of Hargeisa.

Numerous cave paintings from the Neolithic period are found in the Laas Geel complex, on the outskirts of Hargeisa. During November and December 2002, an archaeological survey was carried out in the area by a French team of researchers. The expedition's objective was to search for rock shelters and caves containing stratified archaeological infills capable of documenting the period when production economy appeared in this part of Somaliland (c. 5th and 2nd millennium BCE). During the course of the survey, the French archaeological team discovered the Laas Geel rock art, encompassing an area of ten rock alcoves (caves). In an excellent state of preservation, the paintings show human figures with their hands raised and facing long-horned, humpless cattle.

The rock art had been known to the area's inhabitants for centuries before the French discovery. However, the existence of the site had not been broadcast to the international community. In November 2003, a mission returned to Laas Geel and a team of experts undertook a detailed study of the paintings and their prehistoric context.

Somaliland generally is home to numerous such archaeological sites, with similar rock art and/or ancient edifices such as the Dhambalin rock art. However, many of these old structures have yet to be properly explored, a process which would help shed further light on local history and facilitate their preservation for posterity.

=== The Big Commune and Sheikh Madar ===
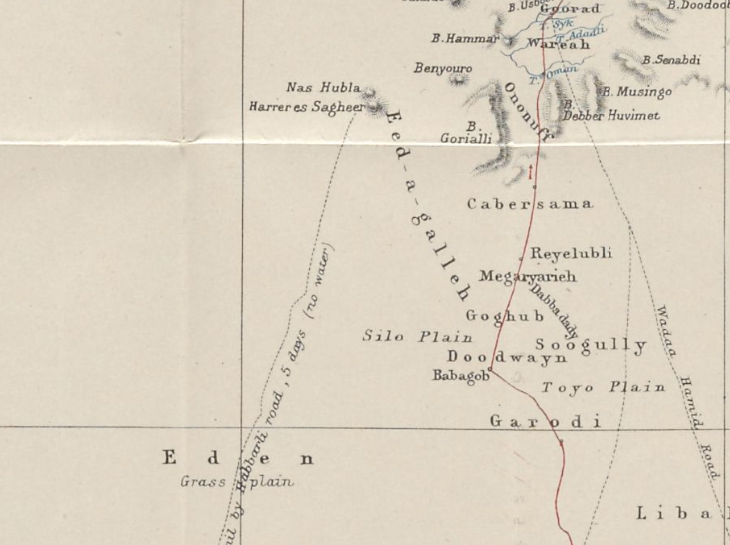
Close-up of an 1885 Royal Geographical Society map, showing Hargeisa (Harrer-es-Sagheer) as well as the Eidagale subtribe (Eed-a-galleh) residing within and around the town. The Naasa Hablood hills (Nas Hubla) can also be seen in the map

According to traditional poetic (gabay) oral accounts, Hargeisa was founded by the Arap as a watering and trading stop for passing nomads and caravans. It is believed that and the Habar Yoonis and the Eidagale subtribes were amongst the early settlers of Hargeisa. Hargeisa continued to grow with the arrival of Sheikh Madar Shirwa, widely considered to be the founder of Hargeisa religious commune and the modern iteration of the settlement.

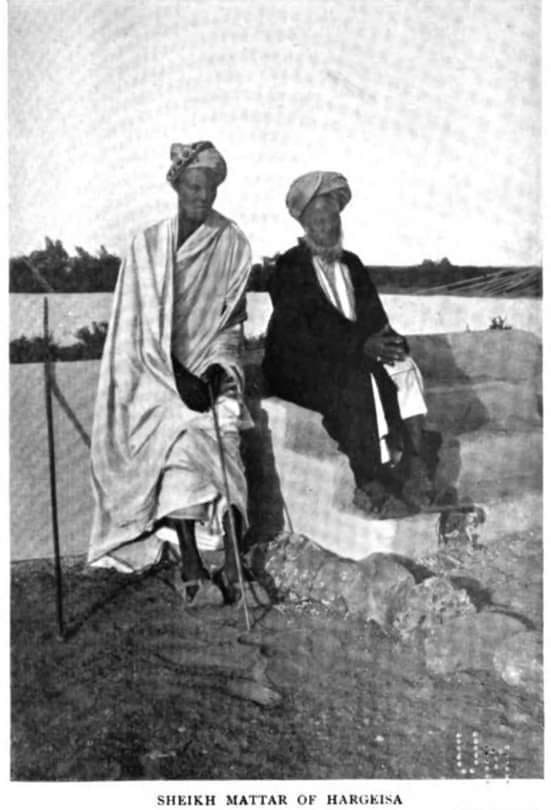
Sheikh Madar (right) and Sultan Deria Hassan in Hargeisa 1912

Madar Shirwa was born in Berbera and belonged to the Nuh Ismail subdivision of the Sa'ad Musa Habr Awal. Madar arrived in Harar to study the Islamic Sciences under the top ulema of Harar, which consisted of Harari and Somali scholars. Sheikh Khalil, one of the ulema of Harar, advised Sheikh Madar to establish a Qadiriyya tariqa commune in present-day Hargeisa and spread the teachings he was taught, which lead Sheikh Madar and his companions to found the Big Commune (Jama'a weyne) of Little Harar (Hargeisa) in c. 1860. Somali pastoralists heavily follow rain and pastures this would change with the agricultural and stationary lifestyle Madar would introduce on the back of large sorghum plantations. This was to maintain self-sufficiency and Sheikh Madar and the other Mullahs would take care of the sick and elderly inhabitants of the growing settlement. Lastly, Sheikh Madar pushed towards a common religious identity rather than identifying solely by tribe. Stone houses and other structures would be built and Hargeisa would develop into a large permanent settlement irrespective of the caravan trade that defined it in decades prior. Sheikh Madar met with the 4th Isaaq Grand Sultan Deria Hassan outside Hargeisa in a famous 1870 shir (meeting) to discuss issues regarding the new town of Hargeisa and agreed that poaching and tree cutting in the vicinity should be banned.

H. Swayne, a British soldier and explorer who traversed the Somali peninsula between the 1880-1890s wrote about Hargeisa in his journals:

This town is built some five hundred yards from the right bank of the Aleyadera nala, and at an elevation of thirty or forty feet above it. Round the place is a patch of jowari (sorghum) cultivation, two and a half miles long and a quarter of a mile broad. Quantities of livestock of all kinds graze on the low undulating hills for half a mile from the Aleyadera nala on either bank. Hargeisa is situated on two important caravan routes, one from Ogaden and the other from Harar. There are good direct camel-roads to Berbera and Bulhar. Supplies of rice, tobacco, and dates can sometimes be bought here in the trading season. Some four hundred people are employed looking after the jowari fields, and may be seen sitting on platforms, shouting and throwing stones to scare birds from the crops. There is abundance of good water in the bed of the river, and a masonry well has been built, and is kept in order by an Arab from Aden. The town is full of blind and lame people, who are under the protection of Sheikh Mattar and his mullahs.

=== British Somaliland ===
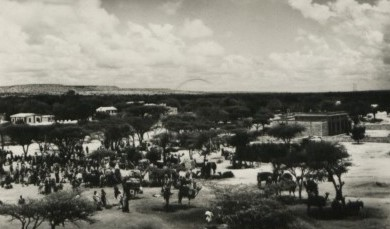
Women's market in Hargeisa, British Somaliland protectorate.

In 1888, after signing successive treaties with the then ruling Somali Sultans and chiefs, the British established a protectorate in the region referred to as British Somaliland with Berbera becoming the capital. The British garrisoned the protectorate from Aden in present-day Yemen, and administered it from their British India until 1898. British Somaliland was then administered by the Foreign Office until 1905 and afterwards by the Colonial Office.

The capital was moved from Berbera to Hargeisa, and the city was granted capital status in 1941. During the East African Campaign, the protectorate was invaded by Italy in August 1940, but recaptured by the British in March 1941. In 1945 the British administration had grown weary of the influence wadaads had wielded in the protectorate and moved to arrest several in Hargeisa. They had been deemed nuisances to implementing 'modern education' and agricultural reforms in Somaliland. Following their arrests on June 4, a mob formed and temporarily freed the imprisoned wadaads who were recaptured the next day. Religious leaders motivated the city's inhabitants and a crowd of several thousand rioters marched on the Hargeisa District Headquarters determined to free the imprisoned wadaads. They were fired upon by the District Commissioner's troops with one dying and dozens imprisoned for trying to free the Sheikhs. The protectorate gained its independence on 26 June 1960 as the State of Somaliland, before uniting as planned days later with the Trust Territory of Somaliland (the former Italian Somaliland) to form the Somali Republic.

=== 1960–1991 ===
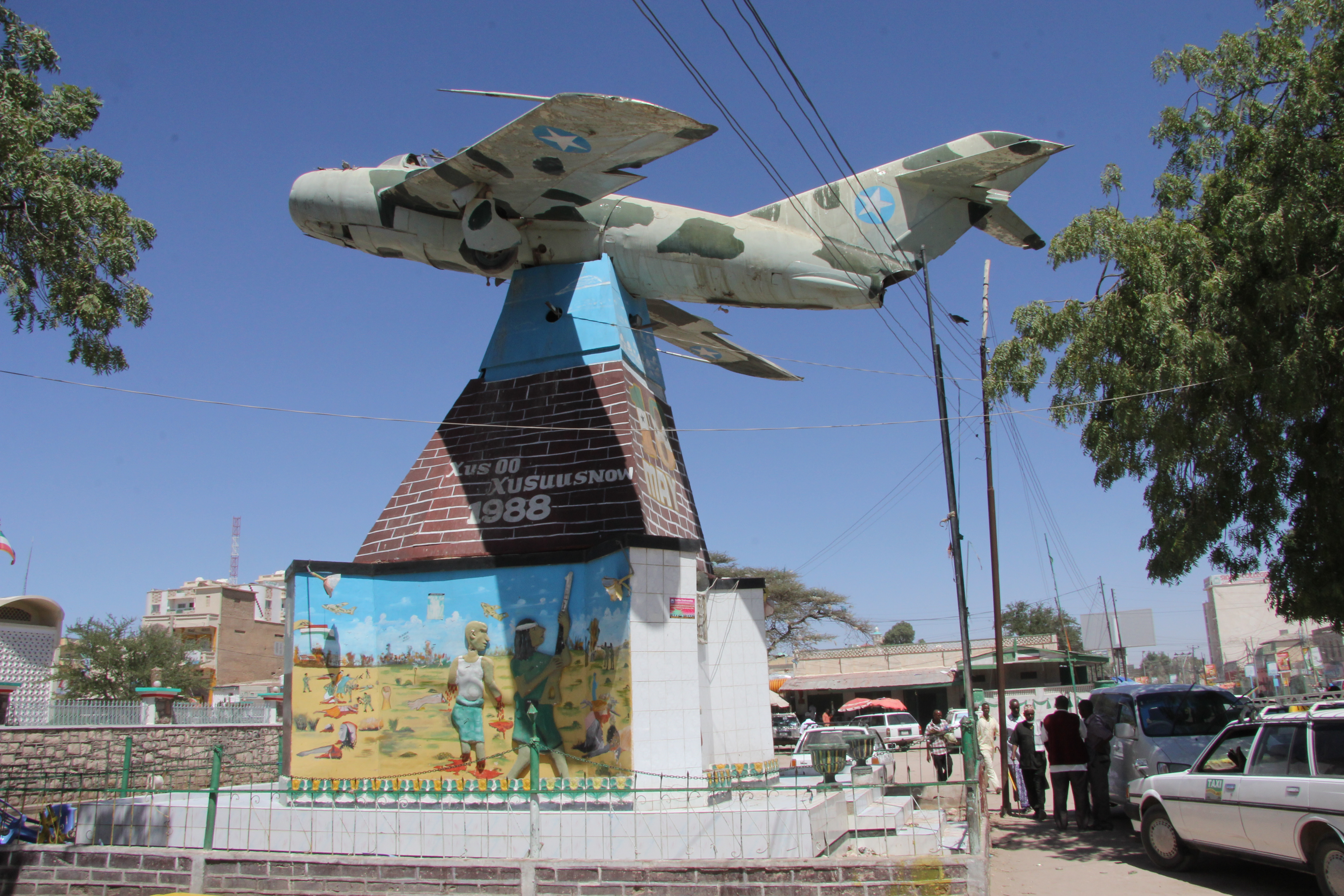
MiG monument in Hargeisa commemorating Somaliland's breakaway from the rest of Somalia during the 1980s.

In the post-independence period, Hargeisa was administered as the capital of the Woqooyi Galbeed province of Somalia. Numerous new development projects were subsequently launched in the city by the Somali government. Among these initiatives was the creation of the Hargeisa Provincial Museum. It was the first museum to be established in Somalia since independence in 1960. The Hargeisa International Airport was also renovated and modernized, with the ultimate aim of equipping the facility to accommodate larger aircraft and offer more flight destinations.

==== SNM offensive ====
On 31 May 1988, at 2:15 a.m, the Somali National Movement (shortened SNM) attacked Hargeisa. With two Habar yunis leaders, one in Burco and the other in the capital city Hargeisa. The SNM force attacking Hargeisa was estimated at 500 men equipped with 84 vehicles, of whom only 14 were left due to vehicles being sent to the front in Adadley. The SNM captured the headquarters of the 26th Division, as well as capturing the Birjeex arms depot where the SNM collected ammunition. An SNM fighter who partook in the Hargeisa offensive described Somali troops dropping their uniforms on the ground and fleeing. The SNM encountered stiff resistance from the Somali Army as they surrounded Radio Hargeisa's headquarters. Due to heavy bombardment from Somali heavy artillery and tanks, the SNM force tasked with capturing Hargeisa airport fell back and retreated to Adadley.

By 1 June, with the exception of Hargeisa Airport, the SNM overran the city. During the Somali army counterattack the SNM line of defense in the city was behind Hargeisa's radio station.

==== Hargeisa campaign ====
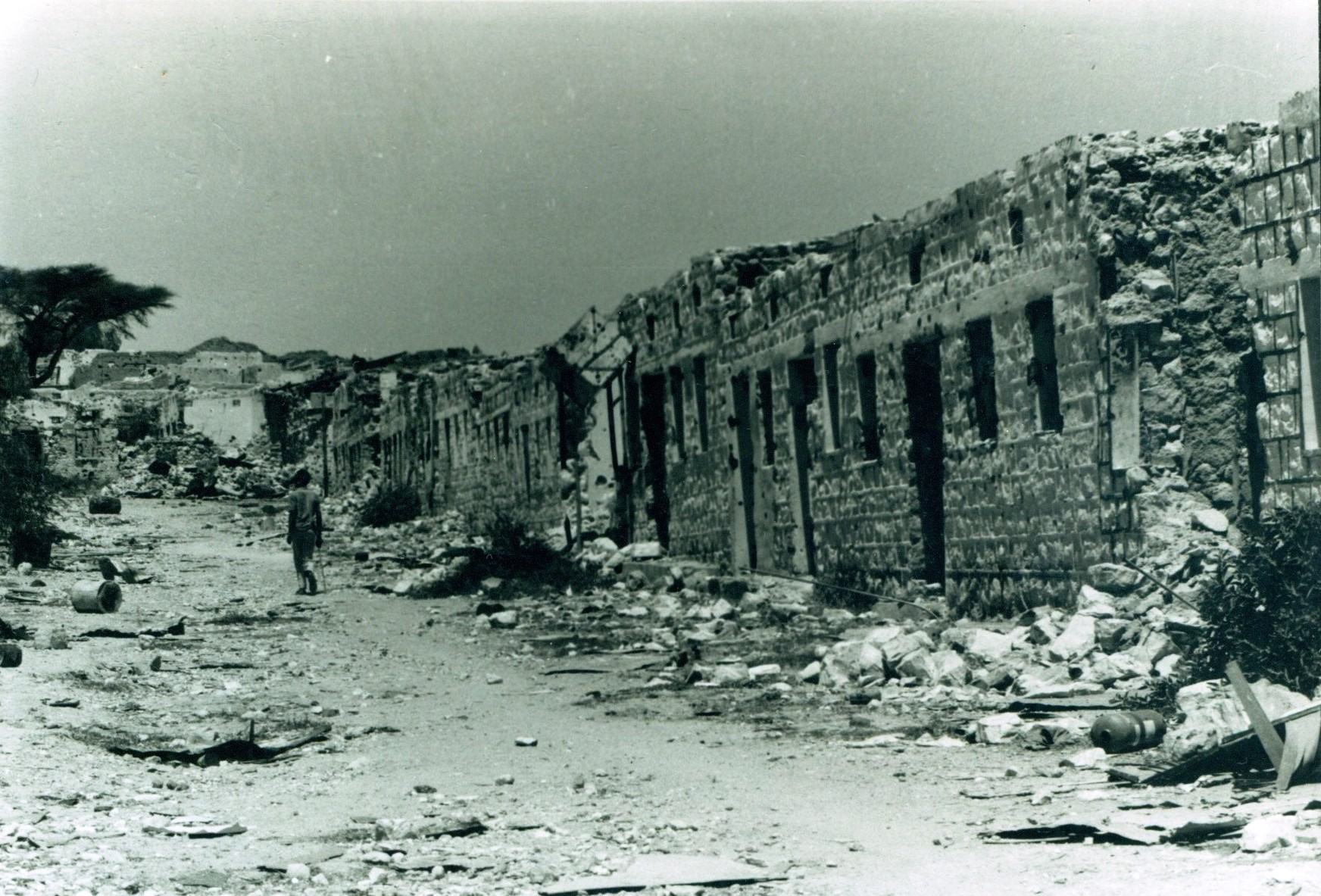
Up to 90% of Hargeisa was destroyed.

Dictator Siad Barre's response to the SNM attacks was of unparalleled brutality; with explicit aims of handling the "Isaaq problem", he ordered "the shelling and aerial bombardment of the major cities in the northwest and the systematic destruction of Isaaq dwellings, settlements and water points. In one of the most brutal episodes of the Isaaq genocide, the regime targeted civilian members of the Isaaq group specifically, especially in the cities of Hargeisa and Burco and to that end employed the use of indiscriminate artillery shelling and aerial bombardment against civilian populations belonging to the Isaaq ethnic group. Up to 90% of the city was destroyed.

=== Reconstruction ===
After the collapse of the Somali central government and the unilateral declaration of independence of the Republic of Somaliland, a slow process of infrastructural reconstruction subsequently began in Hargeisa and other towns in the country.

Since 1991, Hargeisa has undergone a large-scale facelift. The renovations have been largely financed by local entrepreneurs, as well as Somali expatriates sending remittance funds to relatives in the region through some of the various Somali-owned money transfer operators. Most of the destroyed residential and commercial buildings have since been reconstructed, with many newer structures erected. Single-storey buildings downtown are also progressively giving way to multi-storey high-rises.

== Climate ==
Hargeisa has a hot semi-arid climate (Köppen: BSh). The city generally features very warm winters and hot summers. However, despite its location in the tropics, due to the high altitude Hargeisa seldom experiences either very hot or very cold weather, a trait rarely seen in semi-arid climates. The city receives the bulk of its rain between the months of April and September, averaging just over 400 millimetres (16 in) of rainfall annually. Average monthly temperatures in Hargeisa range from 18 °C or 64.4 °F in the months of December and January to 24 °C or 75.2 °F in the month of June.

Climate data for Hargeisa
Month	Jan	Feb	Mar	Apr	May	Jun	Jul	Aug	Sep	Oct	Nov	Dec	Year
Record high °C (°F)	31.1 (88.0)	31.7 (89.1)	32.8 (91.0)	32.8 (91.0)	35.0 (95.0)	33.9 (93.0)	33.9 (93.0)	33.3 (91.9)	32.8 (91.0)	31.7 (89.1)	30.6 (87.1)	28.9 (84.0)	35.0 (95.0)
Mean daily maximum °C (°F)	24.2 (75.6)	26.6 (79.9)	28.7 (83.7)	29.2 (84.6)	30.5 (86.9)	31.0 (87.8)	29.2 (84.6)	29.2 (84.6)	30.5 (86.9)	28.2 (82.8)	26.0 (78.8)	23.7 (74.7)	28.1 (82.6)
Daily mean °C (°F)	17.7 (63.9)	18.7 (65.7)	21.6 (70.9)	23.0 (73.4)	24.1 (75.4)	24.3 (75.7)	23.6 (74.5)	23.6 (74.5)	23.6 (74.5)	24.1 (75.4)	18.7 (65.7)	18.0 (64.4)	21.7 (71.1)
Mean daily minimum °C (°F)	11.6 (52.9)	12.6 (54.7)	15.0 (59.0)	16.6 (61.9)	17.7 (63.9)	17.7 (63.9)	17.1 (62.8)	17.1 (62.8)	17.1 (62.8)	15.0 (59.0)	13.1 (55.6)	12.1 (53.8)	15.2 (59.4)
Record low °C (°F)	2.8 (37.0)	2.8 (37.0)	3.9 (39.0)	9.4 (48.9)	11.7 (53.1)	11.7 (53.1)	10.5 (50.9)	11.1 (52.0)	11.1 (52.0)	7.2 (45.0)	4.4 (39.9)	4.4 (39.9)	2.8 (37.0)
Average rainfall mm (inches)	2 (0.1)	2 (0.1)	36 (1.4)	53 (2.1)	49 (1.9)	61 (2.4)	38 (1.5)	81 (3.2)	61 (2.4)	20 (0.8)	8 (0.3)	1 (0.0)	412 (16.2)
Average rainy days (≥ 0.1 mm)	1	1	3	6	7	9	8	10	11	4	1	0	61
Average relative humidity (%)	65	65	58	57	56	55	53	53	55	56	61	64	58
Average dew point °C (°F)	11 (52)	12 (54)	12 (54)	15 (59)	15 (59)	14 (57)	15 (59)	16 (61)	15 (59)	12 (54)	12 (54)	11 (52)	13 (56)
Mean daily sunshine hours	8.9	9.8	9.7	11.2	11.9	12.1	11.8	12.2	11.4	9.6	8.7	7.6	10.4
Percentage possible sunshine	80	73	80	73	64	73	64	64	73	80	80	80	74
Source 1: Food and Agriculture Organization: Somalia Water and Land Management (temperatures, humidity and percent sunshine)
Source 2: Deutscher Wetterdienst (extremes and precipitation) Time and Date (dewpoints, 2005-2015) Weather Atlas (daily sun hours)

== Administration ==
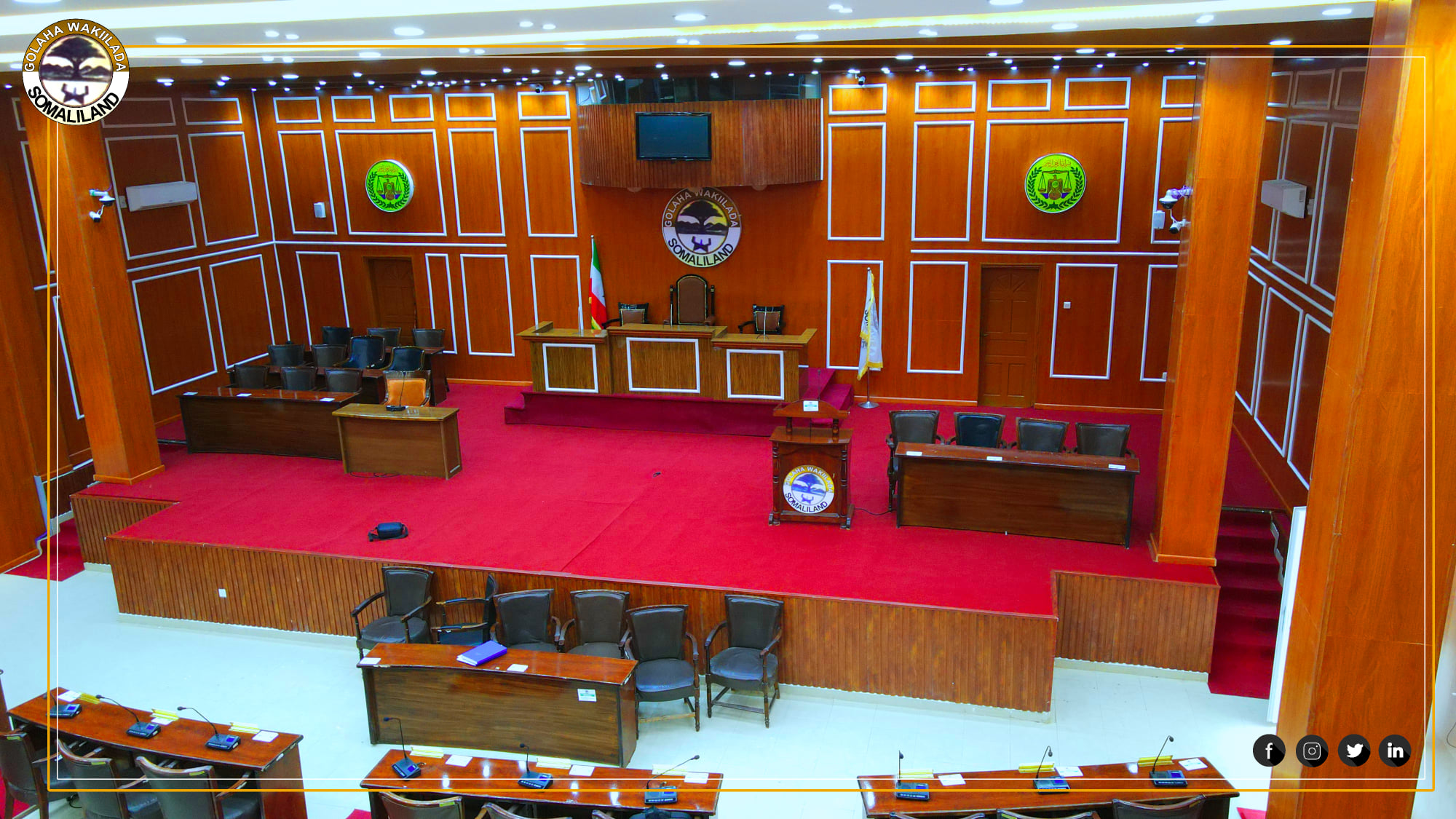
Meeting hall of Somaliland House of Representatives.

Situated in the Maroodi Jeh region of Somaliland, Hargeisa is the seat of the Somaliland's Parliament, the presidential palace, and government ministries.

The first mayor of Hargeisa in 1960 was Aadan Cumar fure, who held the position from 1950 to 1959. The current municipal administration is led by Abdikarim Ahmed Mooge. A member of the Waddani party, he was elected the Mayor during the 2021 Somaliland municipal elections.

== Districts ==
According to a more recent December 2017 report from the Social Research and Development Institute (SORADI) based in Hargeisa, the city divided into eight sub-districts; being the 31 May, 26 June, Ahmed Dhagah, Ahmed Moallim Haruun, Gacan Libaax, Ibrahim Kodbuur, Mohamoud Haibe, and Mohamed Moge Districts. This information is contradictory to an April 2003 report by the Famine Early Warning Systems Network (FEWS NET), which states only five sub-districts exist: being the 26 June, Ahmed Dhagah, Gacan Libaax, Ibrahim Kodbuur, and Mohamoud Haibe sub-districts, each having between four and six sub-sections of their own. Presumably a redistricting occurred sometime between 2004 and 2017.

Each sub-district has their own elected council members, whose responsibility is to represent their district and fulfil their populations needs. To increase the effectiveness of these sub-districts, especially underrepresented ones such as Gacan Libaax, a so-called "accountability forum" has been established to discuss and create policy to better represent marginalized communities.

== Demographics ==
Hargeisa has grown rapidly since the middle of the 20th century. According to I. M. Lewis, Hargeisa's population was estimated to be 30,000 in 1958.

Historical population
Year	Pop.	±%
1901	1,000	—
1920	2,000	+100.0%
1932	20,000	+900.0%
1955	40,000	+100.0%
1960	45,000	+12.5%
1970	50,000	+11.1%
1980	100,000	+100.0%
1990	90,000	−10.0%
1999	250,000	+177.8%
2005	300,000	+20.0%
2007	450,000	+50.0%
2012	850,000	+88.9%
2019	1,200,000	+41.2%
Various

In 2005, the UNDP said that the city had a population of 560,028. According to CIA factbook, Hargeisa had an estimated population of around 760,000 as of 2015. The main residents of Hargeisa are the Sa'ad Musa, the Eidagale, Arap, the Ayub, the Habar Yoonis, the Isa Musa and the Habar Jeclo all of which are subdivisions of the larger Isaaq clan. Also reside the Rer Nuur subclan if the Makahil, the Habar Muse and Habar Xusen Subclans of Maxad'Ase, the Habar Afaan and the Jibril Yonis all of which are subdivisions of the Gadabursi clan and Madigan, Gabooye also reside that area. As of 2019, it is estimated that Hargeisa has a population of 1.2 million The urban area occupies 75 square kilometres (29 sq mi), with a population density of 12,600 inhabitants per square kilometre (33,000/sq mi).

== Economy ==
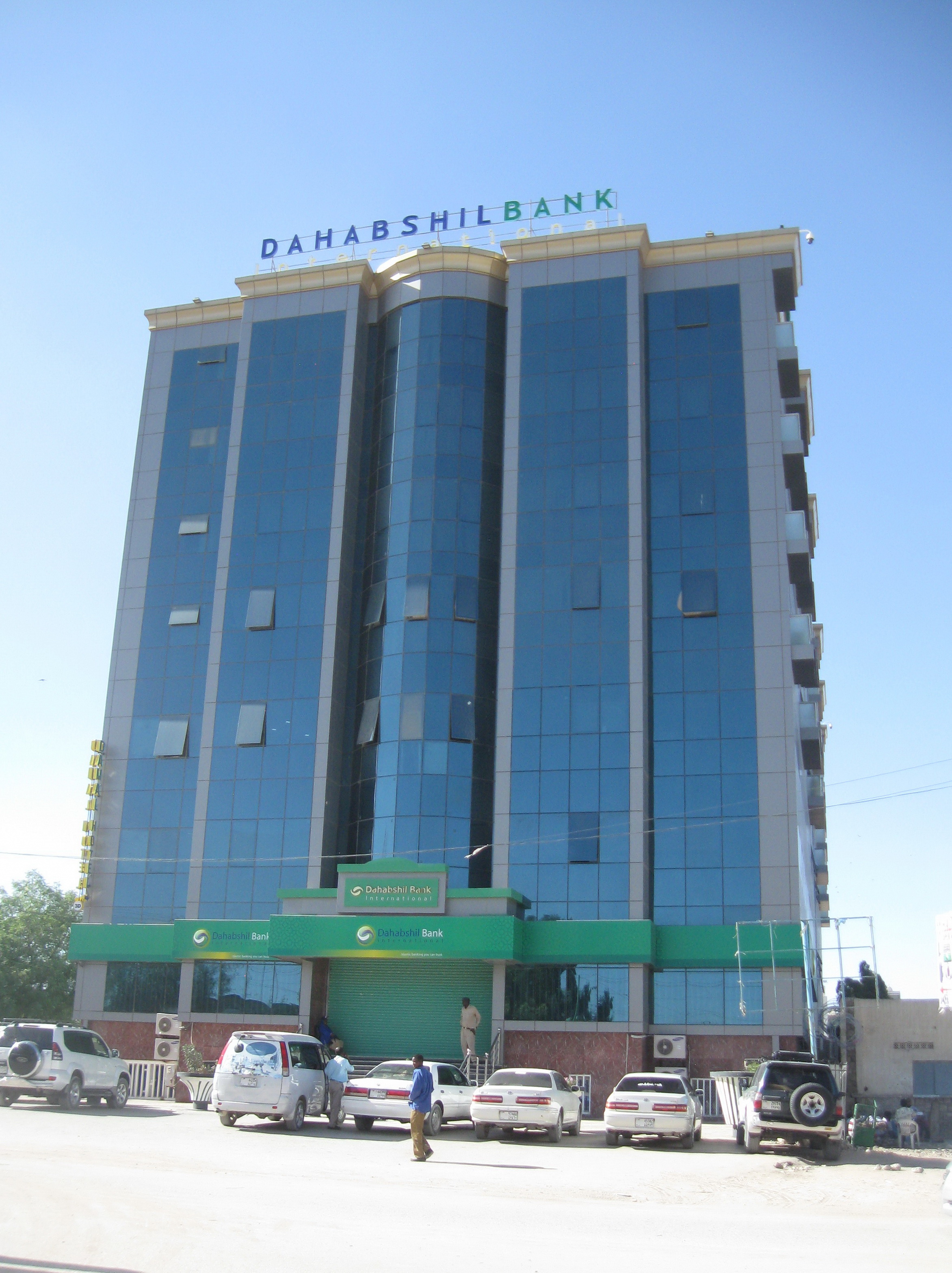
Dahabshiil bank in Hargeisa.

Hargeisa is the financial hub to many entrepreneurial industries ranging from finance, retail, imports/export warehouses to gem cutters, construction, food processing, textiles and livestock trading.

In June 2012, the Partnership Fund for the private sector in Somaliland was launched at Hargeisa's Ambassador Hotel. Part of the larger Partnership for Economic Growth program, the initiative will see $900,000 USD allocated to 13 private local businesses, as well as the creation of 250 new full-time jobs, half of which are to be earmarked for youth and one third for women. The fund is expected to improve job opportunities for 1,300 entrepreneurs through ameliorated product distribution and investment in new technologies and processing facilities. Eligibility is determined through a competitive and transparent selection process overseen by the Partnership program, the Somaliland Chamber of Commerce, and government officials.

== Transportation ==
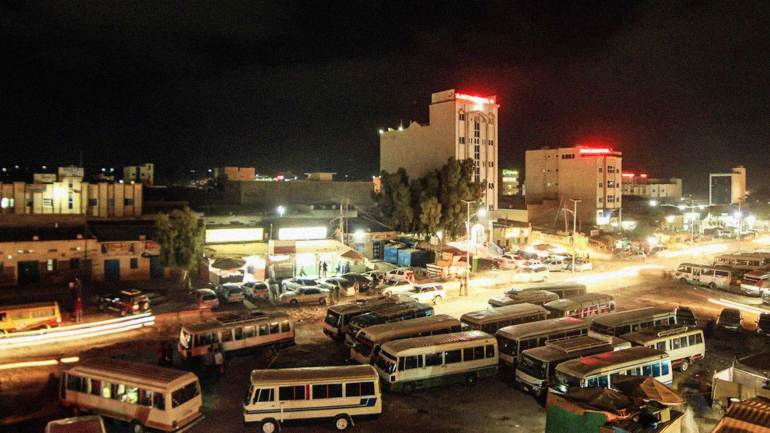
Bus station in Hargeisa at night

Buses are the most commonly used form of public transportation in Hargeisa. They travel on a number of routes serving nearly all of the city's districts. Intercity bus services are also available, which connect Hargeisa to other major cities and towns across Somaliland, including Burao, Berbera and Borama.

With the growth of urban development, several new taxi companies have sprung up in Hargeisa.

=== International Airport ===
For air transportation, the city is served by the Hargeisa International Airport. The Somali-owned private carriers Daallo Airlines and Jubba Airways offer flights to various other towns in neighbouring Somalia, such as Mogadishu, Bosaso and Galkayo. Trips to international destinations are also available, including to Djibouti and Dubai. It has recently gained more airlines such as Ethiopian Airlines and flydubai. However, both airlines have listed the city as being in Somalia since August 2024, following an ultimatum from the Somali government, which would have otherwise seen them prohibited from using Somali airspace.

== Education ==
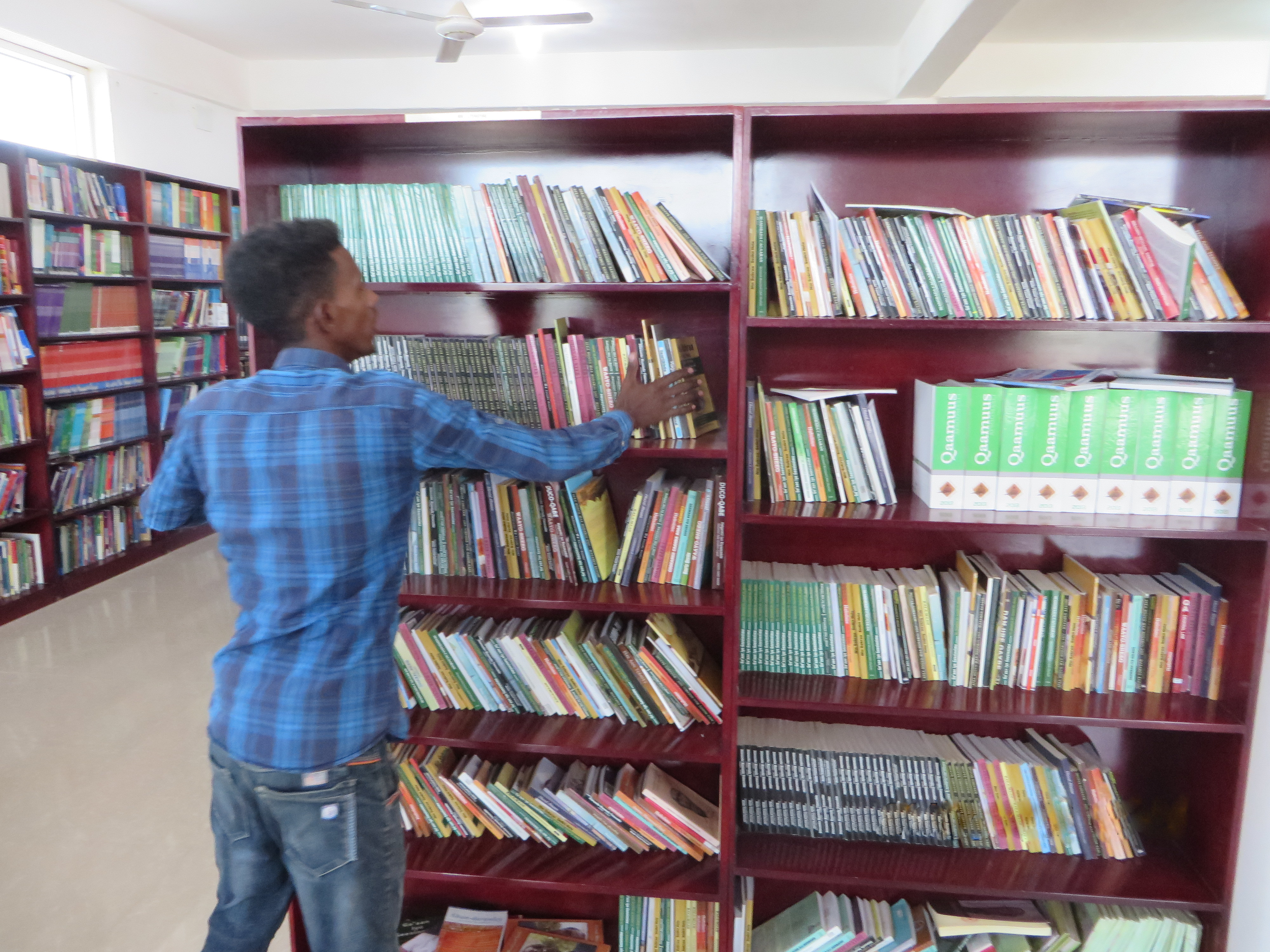
A young librarian arranging books at the National Library of Somaliland in Hargeisa

Various primary schools and nurseries are located in Hargeisa. There are several state-run and privately owned secondary and high schools in the city. Among these are the SOS Sheikh Secondary School, Abaarso School of Science and Technology, Hargeisa Technical School, Salaama Secondary School, and Smart Secondary School, the latter of which is the pre-eminent secondary institution in the area, about 13 km (8 mi) west of Hargeisa.

The city is home to a number of colleges and universities including the University of Hargeisa, Admas University College, Somaliland University of Technology, Frantz Fanon University, Gollis University, New Generation University, Hope University and Marodijeh International University. The Edna Adan Maternity Hospital offers nursing programmes to students. The Institute for Practical Research and Training specializes in (applied) research and training.

== See also ==
- Ali Matan Mosque
- Baligubadle
- Berbera
- Isaaq Sultanate
- Maroodi Jeex
- Salahlay
- Sheikh Madar
