= Somali Youth League =

Nationalist and decolonialist party in Somalia

Somali Youth League Ururka Dhalinyarada Soomaaliyeed 𐒚𐒇𐒚𐒇𐒏𐒖 𐒊𐒖𐒐𐒘𐒒𐒕𐒖𐒇𐒖𐒆𐒖 𐒈𐒝𐒑𐒛𐒐𐒘𐒕𐒜𐒆 رابطة الشباب الصومالي Lega dei Giovani Somali
- Founded: 15 May 1943
- Banned: 1969
- Headquarters: Mogadishu, Somalia; Harar (proposed)
- Ideology: Pan-Somalism; Somali nationalism
- Colours: Red, White, Blue

Party flag

The Somali Youth League (SYL, Somali: Ururka Dhalinyarada Soomaaliyeed 𐒚𐒇𐒚𐒇𐒏𐒖 𐒊𐒖𐒐𐒘𐒒𐒕𐒖𐒇𐒖𐒆𐒖 𐒈𐒝𐒑𐒛𐒐𐒘𐒕𐒜𐒆, Arabic: رابطة الشباب الصومالي, Italian: Lega dei Giovani Somali or Lega Somala della Gioventù), initially known as the Somali Youth Club (SYC), was the first political party in Somalia.

It played a key role in the nation's road to independence during the 1940s, 1950s and 1960s. The founding principle of the SYL was to abstain from mentioning or disclosing one's clan or tribal affiliation, in an effort to foster national unity.

== History ==
=== Somali Youth Club ===
During the Second World War, Britain occupied Italian Somaliland and militarily administered the territory from 1941 to 1950. Under British rule in Somalia The first modern Somali political party, the Somali Youth Club (SYC), was subsequently established in Harar in 1943.

=== Formation of Somali Youth League ===
At its foundation in 1943, the party had thirteen founding members. It later opened an office in Mogadishu. SYL supported Greater Somalia with Harar being the capital and a combined Harari-Somali representatives were commissioned to reveal this proposal to the U.N office in Mogadishu. Somali Youth League members were significantly influenced by the earlier religious rebellion at the turn of the century of various religious figures such as Uways al-Barawi, Sheikh Hassan Barsane and Mohammed Abdullah Hassan.

To empower the new party, the better educated police and civil servants were permitted to join it. By 1948, following an official visit to the territory by the Four Power Commission, the SYC was a well-structured political unit, Abdullahi Issa was elected as its secretary general and renamed itself as the Somali Youth League (SYL) and began to open offices not only in Italian and British Somaliland, but also in the Ogaden and in the Northern Frontier District (NFD). The SYL's stated objectives were to unify all Somali territories, including the NFD and the Ogaden; to create opportunities for universal modern education; to develop the Somali language by a standard national orthography; to safeguard Somali interests; and to oppose the restoration of Italian rule. SYL policy banned clannishness so that the thirteen founding members, although representing four of Somalia's five major clans, refused to disclose their clan affiliations. Although the SYL enjoyed considerable popular support from northerners, the principal parties in British Somaliland were the Somali National League (SNL) and National United Front (NUF), mainly associated with the Isaaq clan, and the United Somali Party (USP), which had the support of the Dir (Gadabuursi) and Darod (Dulbahante and Warsangali) clans.

=== Trust Territory of Somaliland ===
In 1945, the Potsdam Conference was held, where it was decided not to return Italian Somaliland to the control of Italy. The Somali Youth League was firmly against Italian return to Somalia in any form, and campaigned against the return of Italian rule with the slogan, "No matter what the color, a wolf is always a wolf." In the wake of this, the Somali Youth League had proposed a UN Trusteeship to aid Somalia's to independence, under the two preconditions that it was not under Italian administration and that the Trusteeship managed all the Somali inhabited territories. In a memo to the UN the SYL stated:

"We do not pretend we can stand on our own feet for the moment, but ask the United Nations Trusteeship council to decide questions relating to the formation, boundaries, and administration of a Somali Trust Territory known as Somalia, this territory to consist of all areas present predominantly populated by Somalis."

In November 1949 the United Nations decided to grant Italy trusteeship of the former Italian Somaliland. Before the Italians returned to Somalia, the SYL held a major summit in order to formulate a common policy and unified attitude toward the Trusteeship government. It was initially decided to launch an armed resistance, but after serious deliberation the league came to the conclusion that a more 'temperate course' would be better for Somali citizens. Following the summits conclusion the SYL delivered a paper to the chief Italian administrator explaining its position. The League informed the administration that it would continue to agitate for independence and expressed hope that the new government would not resist SYL efforts. It was made clear that the organization was willing to cooperate with the UN if they reciprocated. The SYL demanded that Arabic be made the official language of the Trusteeship instead of Italian and further requested that Italian government not bring back officials from the fascist era.

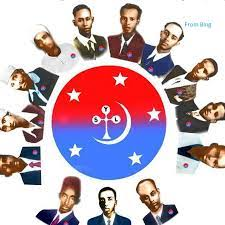

The first half of AFIS's decade long rule would be marked by animosity and conflict between the Italian authorities and the Somali Youth League. Numerous SYL officials who had gained positions of prominence during the era of British Military Administration were either demoted, removed from their positions or imprisoned by Italians officials. These attempts to marginalize the league would lead to demonstrations across the country which were strongly repressed by the government, who had at the time come to decision not cooperate or concede to the SYL's plans.

=== Independence and formation Somali Republic ===
British Somaliland remained a protectorate of Britain until June 26, 1960, when it became independent. The former Italian Somaliland followed suit five days later. On July 1, 1960, the two territories united to form the Somali Republic, albeit within boundaries drawn up by Italy and Britain. A government was formed by Abdullahi Issa Mohamud and Muhammad Haji Ibrahim Egal with Aden Abdullah Osman Daar as the first President of the Somali Republic, and Abdirashid Ali Shermarke as Prime Minister, later to become President (from 1967–1969). On July 20, 1961 and through a popular referendum, the Somali people ratified a new constitution, which was first drafted in 1960.

In the first national elections after independence, held on 30 March 1964, the SYL won an absolute majority of 69 of the 123 parliamentary seats. The remaining seats were divided among 11 parties. Five years from then, in general elections held in March 1969, the ruling SYL led by Mohammed Ibrahim Egal returned to power. However, in the same year, then President of Somalia Abdirashid Ali Sharmarke was assassinated.

=== 1969 Coup d'etat and dissolution ===
In 1969 military coup ensued, with Siad Barre now assuming leadership. Barre's Supreme Revolutionary Council (SRC) subsequently renamed the country the Somali Democratic Republic, arrested members of the former government, banned political parties, dissolved the parliament and the Supreme Court, and suspended the constitution.

== Political leaders ==
=== Founders and leaders ===
The following is a list of the SYL's 13 original members

- Haji Mahamed Hussein Hamud (Dhabarweyne) Leader
- Abdulkadir Sheikh Sakhawudeen
- Yasin Haji Osman Sharmarke
- Syedomar Afrah
- Dahir Haji Osman Sharmarke (Dhegaweyne)
- Mohamed Hirsi Nur (Seyedin)
- Osman Geeddi Rage
- Dhere Haji Dhere
- Ali Hasan Maslah
- Mohamed Ali Nur,
- Mohamed Farah Hilowle
- H. Mohamed Abdullahi Hayesi
- Huudow Maalin Abdulle
- Mohamed Osman Baarbe

=== Notable members ===
The following is a list of other notable public officials that emerged from the SYL's ranks:

Presidents

- Aden Abdullah Osman Daar: July 1, 1960 – June 10, 1967;
- Abdirashid Ali Shermarke: July 6, 1967 – October 15, 1969;
- Mukhtar Mohamed Hussein: October 15, 1969 – October 21, 1969

Prime Ministers

- Abdullahi Issa Mohamud: February 29, 1956 – July 12, 1960
- Abdirashid Ali Shermarke: July 1, 1960 – June 10, 1964
- Abdirizak Haji Hussein: June 14, 1964 – July 15, 1967
- Muhammad Haji Ibrahim Egal: July 15, 1967 – October 21, 1969
- Aden Isaaq Ahmed: October 21, 1969 to Siad's coup
- Umar Arteh Ghalib: January 24, 1991 – May 1993

Presidents of the Somali National Assembly

- Abdulcadir Muhammed Aden "Zoobe": July 1, 1960 – mid-July 1960
- Haji Bashir Ismail Yusuf: Mid-July 1960 – Mid-July 1960
- Jama Abdullahi Qalib: mid-July 1960 – May 26, 1964
- Ahmed Mohamed Obsiye: May 26, 1964 – 1967
- Mukhtar Mohamed Hussein: 1967 – October 15, 1969

Ministers

- Abdillahi Mohammed Ahmed: Minister of National and Coordination
- Sheekh Cabdiqani Sheekh Axmed: Minister of Justice and Religion Affairs
- Haji Farah Ali Omar: Minister of Economic Affairs
- Haji Muse Boqor: Minister of Interior Affairs
- Hirsi Bulhan Farah: Minister of livestock
- Mohamed Said Samatar: Minister of State
- Sheikh Ali Jimale: Minister of Health, Labour and Veterinary Service
- Michael Mariano: Minister of Economic Planning
- Ahmed Shire Egal (Lawaaxo) Secretary of Foreign Affairs

Parliamentarians

- Osman Haji Mohamed: MP for El Dheer

Other

- Ali Shido Abdi: Vice-Chairman of the SYL
- Louis Clement Salole: L.C. Salole designed the SYL flag in Addis Ababa, Ethiopia, in 1942
- Ali Herzi Farah: Honourable speaker & Central committee member

== Somali Youth Day ==
The Somali Youth League's establishment on May 15, 1943 is annually commemorated in Somalia. Official celebrations are organized throughout the country on this Somali Youth Day to honour the SYL's members and their key role in the nation's path to independence. In 2014, government representatives, youth associations, women's groups, singers and local residents celebrated the Somali Youth League's 71st anniversary.

== See also ==
- History of Somalia
- List of political parties in Somalia
- Elections in Somalia
- Somali nationalism
- Decolonisation
