= List of speakers of the Parliament of Somalia =

Speaker of the House of the People of Somalia
- Afhayeenka Gollaha Shacabka
- Incumbent; Abdulkadir Mohamed Nur since 10 August 2026
- Style: The Honourable
- Residence: Villa Hargeisa, Mogadishu, Somalia
- Appointer: The Electorate
- Term length: 4 years, renewable once
- Inaugural holder: Aden Abdullah Osman Daar
- Formation: 29 February 1956
- Deputy: Abdullahi Omar Abshir Sa'diya Yasin Haji Dahir.

The following is a list of speakers of the Parliament of Somalia. There have been 12 official speakers of the Parliament since the office was created in 1956 . The first Speaker of the Parliament was Aden Abdulle Osman, who served prior to independence in the Trust Territory of Somalia, Succeeded by Hagi Bashir Ismail Yusuf on July 1, 1960, Somali National Assembly. The Speakership is currently held by Abdulkadir Mohamed Nur after his predecessor, Aden Madobe, became the President of the South West State.

== Acting President ==
In the event of a temporary absence of the President of Somalia on account of illness, travel abroad or similar circumstances, the speaker of the parliament serves as acting president, and exercises the powers of the state president until the president resumes his functions, and in the event that the presidency falls vacant as a result of death or resignation or for any other reason, until the election of a new president.

== List of speakers ==
No.	Name (Birth–Death)	Portrait	Term of office		Political party
Unicameral - National Assembly Somali Republic (1960–1969)
1	Aden Abdullah Osman Daar (1908–2007)		29 February 1956	1 July 1960	Somali Youth League
—	Haji Bashir Ismail Yusuf; Acting Speaker (1912–1984)		1 July 1960	26 July 1960	Somali Youth League
2	Jama Abdullahi Qalib (1930–2015)		26 July 1960	26 May 1964	Somali Youth League
3	Ahmed Mohamed Obsiye (1914–1984)		26 May 1964	1 March 1967	Somali Youth League
4	Sheikh Mukhtar M.Husein (1912–2012)		1 March 1967	21 October 1969	Somali Youth League
Unicameral – People's Assembly
5	Ismail Ali Abokor (1937–)		5 August 1979	26 January 1982	Supreme Revolutionary Council
6	Mohamed Ibrahim Liqliiqato (1921–1998)		26 January 1982	1 November 1989	Supreme Revolutionary Council
7	Hussein Kulmiye Afrah (1920–1993)		1 November 1989	22 January 1991	Supreme Revolutionary Council
Unicameral – TNG (2000–2004) TFG (2004–2012)
8	Abdallah Isaaq Deerow (1950–2006)		9 August 2000	14 September 2004	Independent
9	Sharif Hassan Sheikh Aden (1954–)		14 September 2004	17 January 2007	Independent
10	Aden Madobe (1956–)		17 January 2007	25 May 2010	Independent
11	Sharif Hassan Sheikh Aden (1954–)		25 May 2010	20 August 2012	Independent
Unicameral – House of the People Federal Government of Somalia (2012–)
—	Muse Hassan Abdulle; Acting Speaker (1940–)		20 August 2012	28 August 2012	Independent
12	Mohamed Osman Jawari (1945–2024)		28 August 2012	9 April 2018	Union for Peace and Development Party
Bicameral – split Senate of Somalia (2016–)
13	Mohamed Mursal Sheikh Abdurahman		30 April 2018	30 April 2022	Tayo Political Party
14	Aden Madobe (1956–)		30 April 2022	11 June 2026	Union for Peace and Development Party
Vacant - (11 June 2026 – 10 August 2026)
15	Abdulkadir Mohamed Nur (1985–)		10 August 2026	Incumbent	Union for Peace and Development Party

== See also ==
- List of Members of the Federal Parliament of Somalia
