= List of presidents of Somalia =

The president of Somalia (Somali: Madaxaweynaha Soomaaliya) is the head of state of Somalia. There have been 9 official presidents since the office was created in 1960. The president is also the commander-in-chief of the Somali Armed Forces. The current office holder is Hassan Sheikh Mohamud, having been elected in the 2022 presidential election. He is the first person to have held the office on multiple occasions, having been previously elected in the 2012 presidential election and held the office from 2012–2017. His term, however, has been disputed by the opposition since 2026 due to claims of its expiration.

== List officeholders ==
No.	Portrait	Name (Birth–Death)	Term of office			Political party	Election
No.	Portrait	Name (Birth–Death)	Took office	Left office	Time in office	Political party	Election
• Somali Republic (1960–1969) •
1	Aden Adde	Aden Adde (1908–2007)	1 July 1960	10 June 1967	6 years, 344 days	SYL	1960
2	Abdirashid Shermarke	Abdirashid Shermarke (1919–1969)	10 June 1967	15 October 1969 X	2 years, 127 days	SYL	1967
–	Sheikh Mukhtar Mohamed Hussein	Sheikh Mukhtar Mohamed Hussein (1912–2012); Acting	15 October 1969	21 October 1969 (Deposed in a coup)	6 days	SYL	—
• Somali Democratic Republic (1969–1991) •
3	Siad Barre	Siad Barre (1910–1995) (Note: Also styled as President of Supreme Revolutionary Council.)	21 October 1969	26 January 1991 (Deposed in rebellion)	21 years, 97 days	SRSP	1980 (Note: After the 1979 parliamentary election, the People's Assembly elected Barre President on 26 January 1980.); 1986
• Interim Government of Somalia (1991–1997) •
4	Ali Mahdi Muhammad	Ali Mahdi Muhammad (1939–2021) (Note: From November 1991 to 1995, Ali Mahdi Muhammad enjoyed recognition as President in the international community following the 1991 Djibouti conference: "at the second Djibouti conference (Aideed boycotted the first) held between 15 and 21 July 1991, Ali Mahdi was elected interim President of Somalia for a period of two years[...] Because of the legitimacy conferred on Ali Mahdi by the Djibouti conference, his government was recognized by several countries, including Djibouti, Egypt, Italy, and Saudi Arabia"; c.f.)	27 January 1991	3 January 1997 (De facto to 27 August 2000)	9 years, 213 days	USC	1991
Vacant (3 January 1997 – 27 August 2000) (Note: In the second half of the 1990s, different faction leaders vied for the Presidency, with none receiving international recognition. General Mohamed Farrah Aidid claimed to be President from 15 June 1995 to his death on 1 August 1996, followed by his son Hussein Farrah Aidid from 2 August 1996 to 20 March 1998.)
• Transitional National Government of Somalia (2000–2004) •
5	Abdiqasim Salad Hassan	Abdiqasim Salad Hassan (born 1941)	27 August 2000	14 October 2004	4 years, 48 days	Independent	2000
• Transitional Federal Government of Somalia (2004–2012) •
6	Abdullahi Yusuf Ahmed	Abdullahi Yusuf Ahmed (1934–2012)	14 October 2004	29 December 2008 (Resigned)	4 years, 76 days	Independent	2004
–	Aden Madobe	Aden Madobe (born 1956); Acting	29 December 2008	31 January 2009	33 days	RRA	—
7	Sharif Sheikh Ahmed	Sharif Sheikh Ahmed (born 1964)	31 January 2009	20 August 2012	3 years, 202 days	ARS	2009
• Federal Republic of Somalia (2012–present) •
–	Muse Hassan Sheikh Sayid Abdulle	Muse Hassan Sheikh Sayid Abdulle (born 1940); Acting (Note: From 20 August 2012 to 28 August 2012, Muse Hassan Abdulle served as acting Speaker of the Parliament, and as such, as acting President while elections for a new Speaker and President were forthcoming. Per Article 95 of the provisional constitution Archived 2013-01-24 at the Wayback Machine: "If the Office of the President of the Federal Republic of Somalia falls vacant, the Speaker of the House of the People of the Federal Parliament shall act as President of the Federal Republic until such time as a new President of the Federal Republic is elected, within a maximum of thirty (30) days."; also c.f.)	20 August 2012	28 August 2012	8 days	Independent	—
–	Mohamed Osman Jawari	Mohamed Osman Jawari (1945–2024); Acting	28 August 2012	16 September 2012	19 days	Independent	—
8	Hassan Sheikh Mohamud	Hassan Sheikh Mohamud (born 1955)	16 September 2012	16 February 2017	4 years, 153 days	PDP	2012
9	Mohamed Abdullahi Mohamed	Mohamed Abdullahi Mohamed (born 1962)	16 February 2017	23 May 2022	5 years, 96 days	TPP	2017
(10)	Hassan Sheikh Mohamud	Hassan Sheikh Mohamud (born 1955); Disputed (Note: The presidency has been disputed since 15 May 2026, with Mohamud asserting that the constitutional amendments passed on 30 March 2024 mean that he continues to be the legitimate president until 15 May 2027. The opposition dispute the constitutional amendments as being invalid, stating that the constitutional term of Mohamud expired on 15 May 2026 in accordance with the provisional constitution of Somalia.)	23 May 2022	Incumbent	4 years, 177 days	UPD	2022

== See also ==
- History of Somalia
- Politics of Somalia
- List of colonial governors of British Somaliland
- List of colonial governors of Italian Somaliland
- President of Somalia
- List of prime ministers of Somalia
- List of speakers of the Parliament of Somalia
