= Shido =

Shido may refer to:

- A 'slight' or minor penalty in judo
- Ali Shido Abdi, senior Somali politician and elder
- Shido Fuyuki, a character in the Japanese manga and anime series GetBackers
- Shido, Kagawa, a former town located in Ōkawa District, Kagawa Prefecture, Japan, now part of Sanuki
- Matagu Shido, a character in the Japanese anime series Please Teacher!
- Haruko Shido, a character in the Japanese anime series Please Twins!
- Shido Itsuka, protagonist of the anime series Date A Live
- Masayoshi Shido, an antagonist in Persona 5

Shidō may also refer to:

- Shidōkan (disambiguation)
- Nakamura Shidō (born 1972), better known by the stage name Nakamura Shidō II, Japanese kabuki and film actor
- Sidoh
