= Abdillahi Mohammed Ahmed =

Somali politician (born 1923)

His Excellency Abdillahi Mohamed Ahmed "Qablan": Hon. Abdillahi
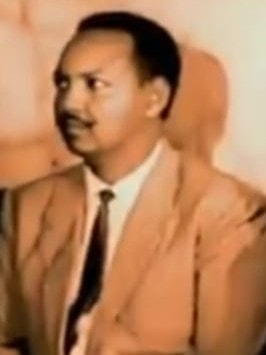

Minister of National and Coordination of Somalia
- In office 1946–1960

Secretary of State Somalia
- In office 1960–1964

Personal details
- Born: 1926 Las Khorey, Somaliland
- Died: March 14, 1993 (aged 67) Bosaso, Somalia
- Party: Somali Youth League

Abdillahi Mohamed Ahmed "Qablan": Hon. Abdillahi (1926–1993) was born in 1926 in Las Khorey. He was a member of the political party Somali Youth League (SYL) in Somalia and the Minister of National and Coordination.

== Early life ==
He was taken to Aden at the age of five and had Quranic and Elementary education there. At the age of thirteen he went into business and began to rise in this career step by step until he became Branch Manager for the Firm A. Besse and Co. in Bosaso.

== Career ==
In 1946, he joined the Somali Youth League and in 1960 was elected to the party in Berbera. He went into politics in the Legislative Council during the general Elections of February 1960. For a period of time he was a Secretary of State in the Abdirashid Shermarke Somalia Government.

From September 1964 until he resigned from Abdirizak's Government in April 1966, he was Secretary of Finance e. He was elected from Las Khorey both in 1960 and in 1964.

He also served as the first Minister of National and Co-ordination (now Planning) in the Mohamed Ibrahim H.Igaal Government. In 1969 after the military took over the power he established the first National Drilling Company.
