= Abdirizak Haji Hussein =

Prime Minister of Somalia

Abdirizak Haji Hussein عبد الرزاق حاجي حسين Cabdirisaaq Xaaji Xuseen
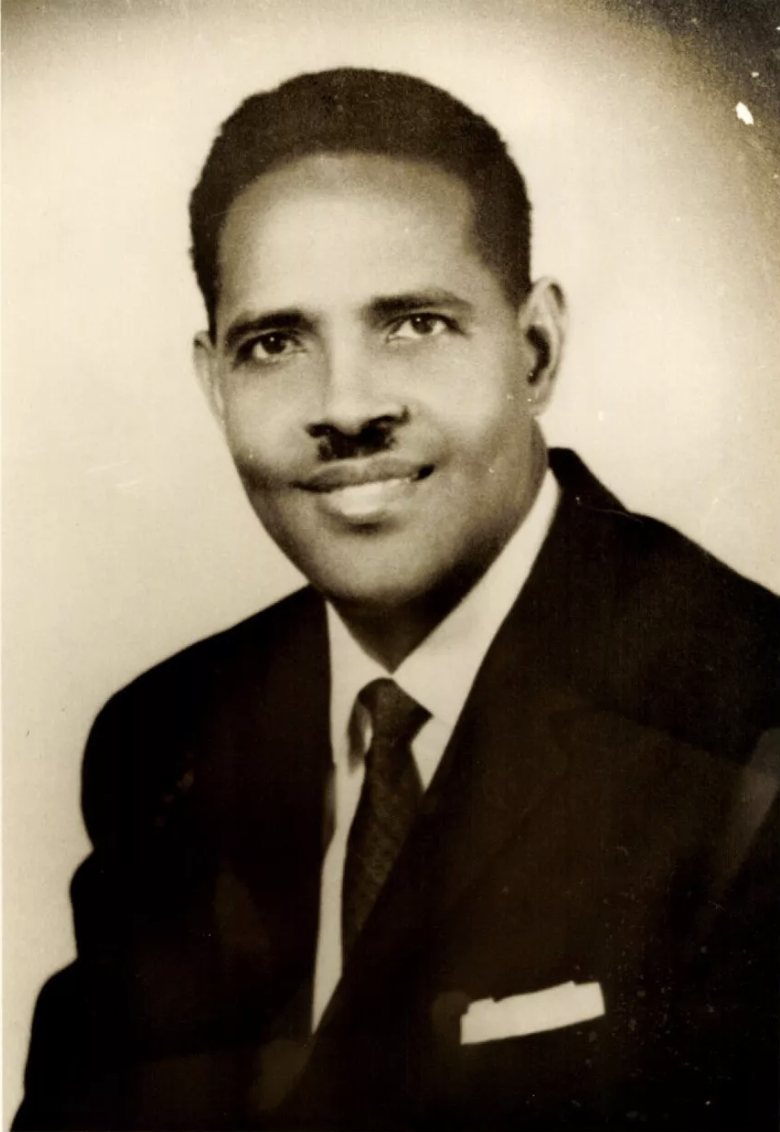
- Official portrait, c. 1964

3rd Prime Minister of Somalia
- In office 14 June 1964 – 15 July 1967
- President: Aden Adde
- Preceded by: Abdirashid Ali Shermarke
- Succeeded by: Muhammad Haji Ibrahim Egal

Minister of Interior
- In office 22 July 1960 – 19 November 1962
- Preceded by: Abdullahi Issa Mohamud
- Succeeded by: Mohamud Abdi Nur

Minister of Public Works and Communications
- In office 19 November 1962 – 14 June 1964
- Preceded by: Abdi Nur Mohamed Hussein
- Succeeded by: Abdulle Mohamud Mohamed

Personal details
- Born: 24 December 1924 Galkayo, Italian Somalia (now Somalia)
- Died: 31 January 2014 (aged 89) Minneapolis, Minnesota, U.S.
- Party: Somali Youth League

Abdirizak Haji Hussein (Somali: Cabdirisaaq Xaaji Xuseen; Arabic: عبد الرزاق حاجي حسين; 24 December 1924 – 31 January 2014) was a Somali diplomat and politician. He was the Prime Minister of Somali Republic from 14 June 1964 to 15 July 1967.

Hussein was an early member of the Somali Youth League (SYL), serving as its Secretary General during 1956. He came to play a leading role in the administration of the newly formed independent Somali Republic in the 1960s, eventually serving as prime minister from 1964 to 1967. During his tenure Hussein spearheaded reforms that strove to uproot corruption and pushed to make the republic's institutions more accountable.

After the 1969 Somali coup d'état that overthrew the civilian government, he was ordered imprisoned by the Supreme Revolutionary Council (SRC). Hussein was later freed and served as the ambassador to the United Nations for the Somali Democratic Republic during the 1970s.

== Early life ==
Hussein was born in 1924 in Galkayo, the capital of the north-central Mudug region of Somalia. His family hailed from the Majeerteen Harti Darod clan. He studied the Qur'an under his father, Hajji Hussein Atosh, who was an authority on Islam. During his formative years he worked as a camel herder. Hussein lost his mother at a young age.

In 1937 he travelled to Mogadishu, where he enrolled in school until the outbreak of World War II in 1939.

Hussein was largely self-educated, and was fluent in both Italian and English. He was married, and had two daughters and a son.

== Career ==
=== Early career ===
During 1941, the colonial Italian Somaliland territory was toppled during the East African campaign and a British Military Administration (BMA) was set up in its place. From 1942 to 1949, Hussein served as an officer in the British Military Administration, including as an interpreter. He was also a clerk during the early periods of the Trust Territory of Somalia. In 1950, he was imprisoned for six months for protesting for Somali independence.

In 1944, Hussein joined the Somali Youth League. He subsequently became a Galkayo Councillor in 1954, during the nation's first municipal elections.

In June 1955, Hussein was sent to the United Nations, where he presented a petition on the SYL's behalf. He was elected the party's secretary general a few months later, and became a Member of Parliament for the Nugal District of the Mudug region in 1959. That same year, Hussein elected to the National Assembly in 1959. During this period, he was also the president of the Higher Institute of Law and Economics and would later go on to become the president of the University Institute. In the first post-independence government of Abdirashid Ali Sharmarke, Hussein served as Minister of Interior from 1960 to 1962, and Minister of Public Works and Communications from 1962 to 1964.

== Prime Minister of Somalia ==
=== Civilian administration ===
In November 1963 the Somali Youth League won 74 percent of the seats during the nationwide municipal elections. These were followed in March 1964 by the country's first post-independence national elections. Again the SYL triumphed, winning 69 out of 123 parliamentary seats. The party's true margin of victory was even greater, as the fifty-four seats won by the opposition were divided among a number of small parties.

After the 1964 National Assembly election in March, a crisis occurred that left Somalia without a government until the beginning of September. President Osman, who was empowered to propose the candidate for prime minister after an election or the fall of a government, chose Abdirizak Haji Hussein as his nominee instead of the incumbent, Abdirashid Ali Shermarke, who had the endorsement of the SYL party leadership. Shermarke had been prime minister for the four previous years, and Osman decided that new leadership might be able to introduce fresh ideas for solving national problems.

In drawing up a Council of Ministers for presentation to the National Assembly, the nominee for prime minister chose candidates on the basis of ability and without regard to place of origin. But Hussein's choices strained intraparty relations and broke the unwritten rules that there be clan and regional balance. For instance, only two members of Shermarke's cabinet were to be retained, and the number of posts in northern hands was to be increased from two to five.

The SYL's governing Central Committee and its parliamentary groups became split. Hussein had been a party member since 1944 and had participated in the two previous Shermarke cabinets. His primary appeal was to younger and more educated party members. Several political leaders who had been left out of the cabinet joined the supporters of Shermarke to form an opposition group within the party. As a result, the Hussein faction sought support among non-SYL members of the National Assembly.

Although the disagreements primarily involved personal or group political ambitions, the debate leading to the initial vote of confidence centered on the issue of Greater Somalia. Both Osman and prime minister-designate Hussein wanted to give priority to the country's internal economic and social problems.

The proposed cabinet failed to be affirmed by a margin of two votes. Seven National Assembly members, including Shermarke, abstained, while forty-eight members of the SYL voted for Hussein and thirty-three opposed him. Despite the apparent split in the SYL, it continued to attract recruits from other parties. In the first three months after the election, seventeen members of the parliamentary opposition resigned from their parties to join the SYL.

Osman ignored the results of the vote and again nominated Hussein as prime minister. After intraparty negotiation, which included the reinstatement of four party officials expelled for voting against him, Hussein presented a second cabinet list to the National Assembly that included all but one of his earlier nominees. However, the proposed new cabinet contained three additional ministerial positions filled by men chosen to mollify opposition factions. The new cabinet was approved with the support of all but a handful of SYL National Assembly members. Hussein remained in office until the presidential elections of June 1967.

The 1967 presidential elections, conducted by a secret poll of National Assembly members, pitted former prime minister Shermarke against Osman. Again the central issue was moderation versus militancy on the pan-Somali question. Osman, through Hussein, had stressed priority for internal development. Shermarke, who had served as prime minister when pan-Somalism was at its height, was elected president of the republic.

=== Greater Somalia ===
Due to the Somali government's vision of uniting Somali-inhabited territories, the administration was suspected of giving aid and support to the irredentist movements in the Ogaden region in Ethiopia, the Northern Frontier District of northeastern Kenya, and French Somaliland. Even though Hussein favoured the idea of Greater Somalia, he persistently denied reports that his government was involved in support. He stated his policy was to pursue the issue constitutional and peaceful means. He called for United Nations plebiscites in the Somali-inhabited areas outside the republic and asked for the Organization of African Unity to send fact-finding commissions to the areas to determine what the Somali inhabitants of these disputed areas desired. Neither organization responded to his calls but the Organization of African Unity passed a resolution favouring the retention of existing boundaries inherited from the European colonial powers throughout Africa.

== Later years ==
Immediately after the 1969 Somali coup d'état that overthrew the civilian government, Hussein became a political prisoner and remained in detention from 1969 to April 1973. In 1974, he was appointed as Somalia's representative to the United Nations, a position which he held until 1979. During the Somali civil war, Hussein was called on several times to help reconcile the warring parties.

On May 6, 2001, an effort by the Transitional National Government (TNG) to create the National Commission for Reconciliation and Property Settlement (NCRPS), a 25-member working body, was stalled when Abdirizak Haji Hussein was named as its chief. The Somalia Reconciliation and Restoration Council (SRRC) and Puntland's then leadership opposed the bid. On July 25, 2001, Hussein resigned from the post.

== Death and legacy ==
Hussein died of pneumonia on 31 January 2014 in Minneapolis, Minnesota, United States, after being hospitalized for a week.

Prime Minister of Somalia Abdiweli Sheikh Ahmed issued a statement a few hours later sending his condolences to Hussein's family and friends. Ahmed described Hussein as "one of the leading Somali nationalists of [the] 20th century," noting that the late statesman was "a leading member of the freedom fighters of [the] Somali Youth League and following independence became a committed public servant and politician who dedicated his life to the people and the Republic of Somalia[...] we must now take forward his legacy." Ahmed concurrently appointed a governmental committee to start preparations for a national funeral for Hussein, which would be chaired by Deputy Prime Minister Ridwan Hirsi Mohamed.

Additionally, the Federal Government of Somalia announced that national memorial days would be held in Mogadishu in Hussein's honour, with the late leader's body slated to be transported to the city for burial. Puntland president and former prime minister of Somalia Abdiweli Mohamed Ali was among the dignitaries scheduled to attend Hussein's funeral service in the capital.

After originally departing from Minneapolis, Hussein's body arrived in Istanbul, Turkey, where governmental officials awaited on 5 February 2014. The Somali National Funeral Committee announced that Hussein would be buried in Mogadishu's National Cemetery, with the official farewell event slated to start on Friday after the burial service. Three days of national mourning and the lowering of the flag would begin the same day.

On 7 February 2014, Hussein was laid to rest at a memorial service in Mogadishu Cemetery. The ceremony was attended by a number of dignitaries, including President of Somalia Hassan Sheikh Mohamud, Prime Minister Abdiweli Sheikh Ahmed, Parliament Speaker Mohamed Osman Jawari, and Puntland president Abdiweli Mohamed Ali, with security in the city concurrently bolstered. Janaza prayers were read at the capital's largest mosque, after which a burial service was held at the Al-Irfid cemetery on the outskirts of Mogadishu. Hussein was buried beside his former colleague, Aden Abdulle Osman Daar, the Somali Republic's first president. Incumbent president Mohamud sent his condolences to Hussein's family and the people of Somalia, and urged the gathered attendees to "pray for one of Somalia's greatest heroes[...] Abdirizak Haji Hussein was a great man and a towering Somali patriot[...] His life should be an example to all Somalis."

As a career politician, Hussein is remembered for his emphasis on responsible leadership. Most of his Cabinet members and director generals were educated, young and energetic professionals who had been selected on the basis of merit. During his tenure as Somalia's ambassador to the United Nations, Hussein also signed a number of international agreements on the country's behalf, including the International Convention on Suppression and Punishment of the Crime of Apartheid. Openness, stability, fairness, anti-corruption and anti-nepotism, and good governance characterized his political career, particularly his tenure as prime minister.

== See also ==
- Hirsi Bulhan Farah
- Abdullahi Yusuf Ahmed
- Aden Abdulle Osman Daar
- Haji Bashir Ismail Yusuf

== Bibliography ==
- Hussein, Abdirazak Haji (2017). Abdirazak Haji Hussein : My role in the foundation of the Somali nation-state, a political memoir. African World Press. ISBN 9781569025314. OCLC 980302551.
- Europa Publications Limited (1961). The Middle East and North Africa, Volumes 5-17. Europa Publications. p. 909.
- Publitec Publications (2007). Who's Who in the Arab World 2007-2008. Walter de Gruyter. p. 397. ISBN 978-3110930047.

Political offices
Preceded by Abdirashid Ali Shermarke	Prime Minister of Somalia; 1964-1967	Succeeded by Muhammad Haji Ibrahim Egal
