= Greater Somalia =

Areas in East Africa in which ethnic Somalis live and have historically inhabited

Historically ethnic Somali inhabited territory roughly corresponding to Greater Somalia.

Greater Somalia or Greater Somaliland (Somali: Soomaaliweyn; Arabic: الصومال الكبرى, romanized: al-Sūmāl al-Kubrā), is the geographic location comprising the regions in the Horn of Africa in which ethnic Somalis live and have historically inhabited.

During the Scramble for Africa at the end of the 19th century, Somali-inhabited territories were partitioned between imperial powers. The unification of these territories became a focal objective of an independent Somalia. Referred to as "Greater Somalia," these regions, at the outset of Somali independence, encompassed State of Somaliland (former British Somaliland) and Trust Territory of Somaliland (former Italian Somaliland), which had successfully merged into a single nation in 1960. French Somaliland, the Northern Frontier District (NFD) in Kenya, and the Ogaden region in Ethiopia were placed under the control of neighboring states, despite the pre-independence unification efforts of Somali nationalists.

The post-independence governments of the Somali Republic (1960–1969) and the Somali Democratic Republic (1969–1991) expended significant effort towards the unification of the NFD and French Somaliland with Somalia; however, their primary focus was the Ogaden region, which had been occupied by Ethiopia since Menelik's invasions in the 1890s. From 1960 onwards, Somalis in Ethiopia and Kenya seeking self-determination have waged several insurgencies with the support of neighbouring Somalia, such as the Shifta War, escalating into several major interstate conflicts including the 1964 Ethio-Somali War and 1977 Ogaden War in Ethiopia.

However, following the breakout of the Somali Civil War and the splintering of Somalia into various autonomous polities, the concept of Greater Somalia has seen a decline in support, with some Somali diaspora communities advocating for autonomy or secession (such as Puntland and Somaliland) rather than a fully-fledged union.

== History ==
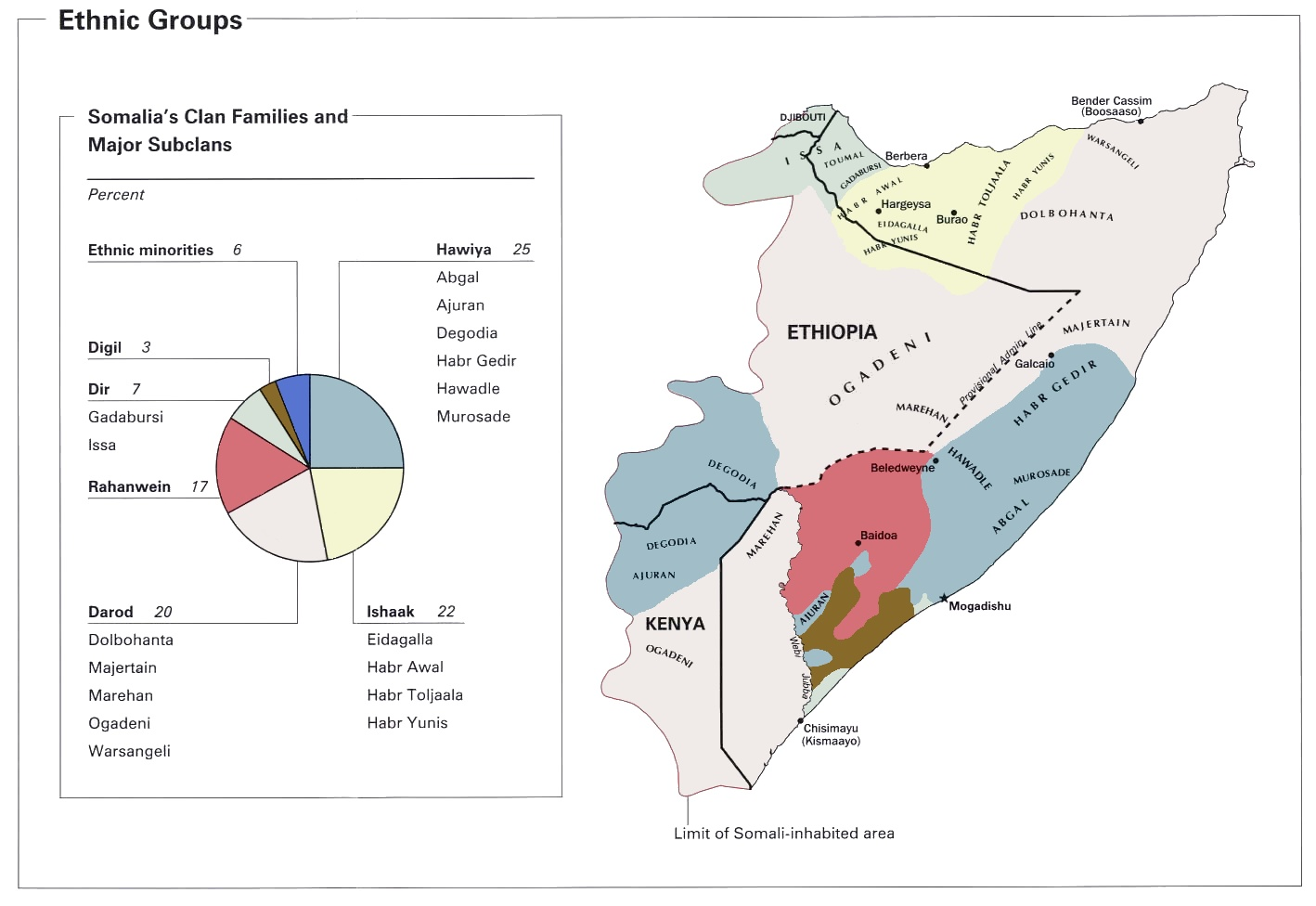
CIA map of the greater Somali territory across the Horn

Since the early 20th century, the vision of Greater Somalia has taken shape, aiming to unite all Somali-inhabited regions in the Horn of Africa into a single nation. This concept, known as Pan-Somalism, seeks to consolidate these territories into one cohesive Somali state. The pursuit of this ideal has fueled conflicts, notably Somalia’s role in the Ogaden War with Ethiopia over the Somali Region and its support for Somali insurgents against Kenya. In 1946, the Somali Youth League proposed Harar as the future capital of Greater Somalia, dispatching delegates to the United Nations office in Mogadishu to advocate for this vision.

=== Colonialism ===
The colonisation of Somali territories during the Scramble for Africa in the late 19th and early 20th centuries involved multiple European powers and the Ethiopian Empire, driven by strategic and economic interests. The United Kingdom, France, and the Kingdom of Italy were the primary colonial powers vying for control of Somali-inhabited regions, motivated mainly by the need for trade routes and geopolitical dominance. Emperor Menelik's expansion into Somali inhabited territory coincided with the European colonial advances in the Horn of Africa, during which the Ethiopian Empire imported a significant amount of arms from European powers. The large scale importation of European arms completely upset the balance of power between the Somalis and the Ethiopian Empire, as the colonial powers blocked Somalis from receiving firearms.

Britain established a protectorate in northern Somalia (modern-day Somaliland) by signing treaties with the local Isaaq clans in the 1880s, guaranteeing nominal independence but controlling trade and order at ports like Berbera. Many of these clans had signed the protection treaties with the British in response to Ethiopian Emperor Menelik's Invasions. The agreements dictated the protection of Somali rights and the maintenance of independence.

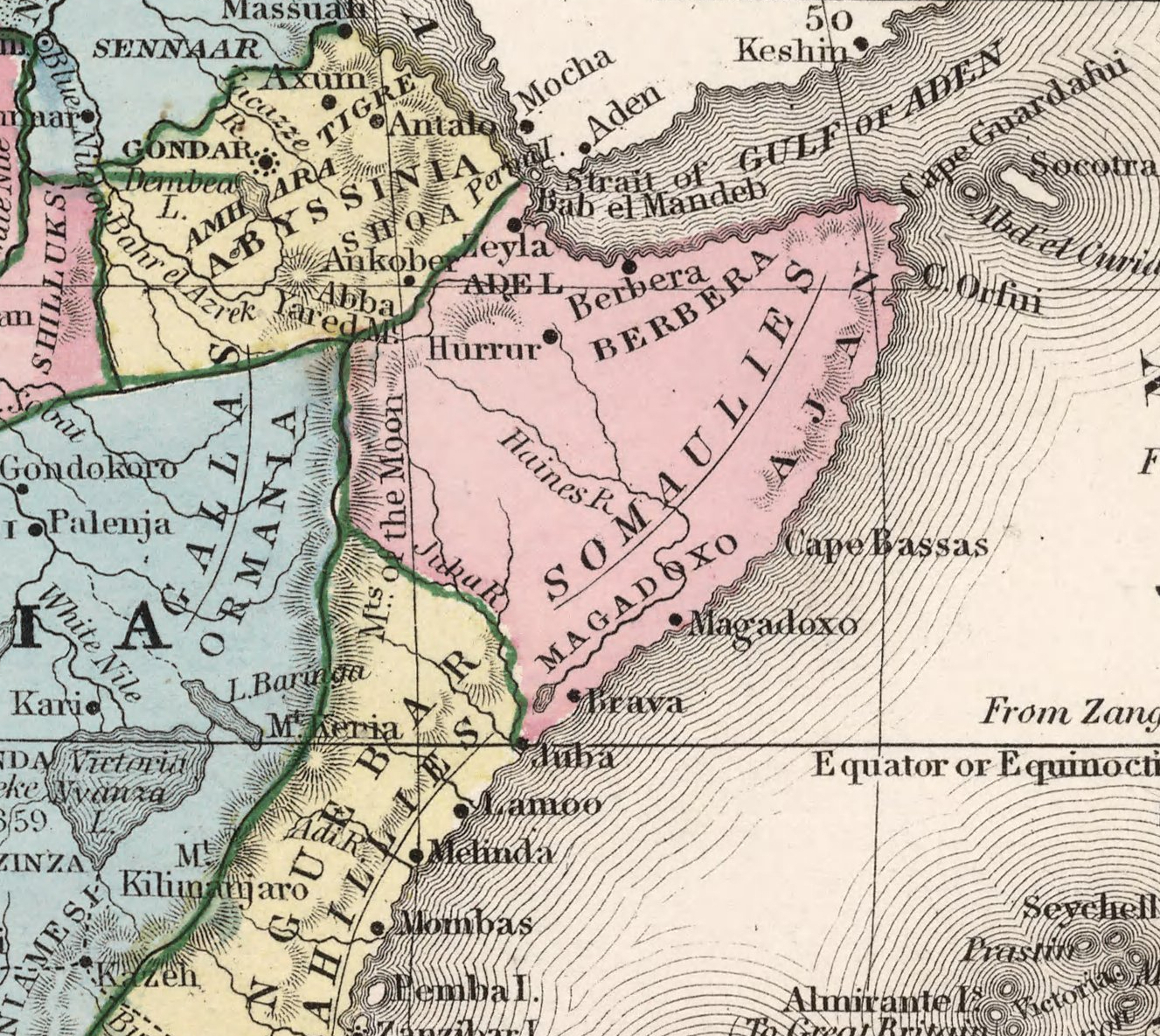
Somali territories depicted on map before 1884 Berlin Conference to divide Africa.

France developed Djibouti as a coaling station, formalising French Somaliland in 1884, which remained a colony until 1977 when it later became the Republic of Djibouti. Italy also acquired southern Somali territories, establishing Italian Somaliland by 1889.

The Anglo-Ethiopian Treaty of 1897 granted the Ethiopian Empire sovereignty over the Ogaden and Haud regions, an effectively illegal action by the British Empire, since the treaty directly contravened the protection agreements Britain had previously concluded with several Somali clans. The Dervish Movement however, led by Sayyid Mohammed Abdullah Hassan, was a significant anti-colonial movement that united various Somali clans, repelled British and Ethiopian forces multiple times, and created a proto-state. The Dervish movement was defeated in 1920 by the British launching a combined air and ground campaign—the first major aerial bombardment in Africa. The anti-colonial resistance of the Dervish movement and other groups fostered early Somali nationalism and resentment against the borders imposed by colonial powers, laying ideological groundwork for Greater Somalia.

During World War I, the British entered into an agreement with Italy, promising to transfer control of a significant part of the Jubaland protectorate, a region located in southwestern Somalia. Italy, in return for joining the Allied powers, was to be granted this substantial portion of land. In 1924, Trans-Juba was transferred to Italian Somaliland as stipulated in the wartime pact. Britain retained control of the southern half of the partitioned Jubaland territory, which was later merged into the Northern Frontier District (NFD) of Kenya.

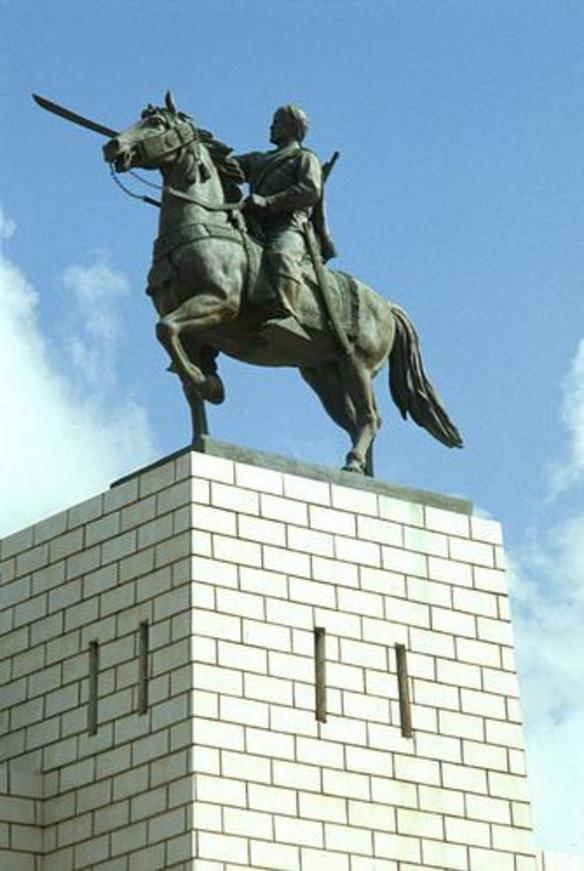
Statue of Somali anti-colonial hero Sayyid Mohammed Abdullah Hassan, who fought for the liberation and unification of the Somali territories

Over the next few years, Britain and Italy solidified control over their respective Somalilands, while France governed Djibouti. Somali-inhabited areas in the Northern Frontier District and the Ogaden region remained under foreign rule. During this time, Somali clans faced considerable economic marginalisation and restricted movement due to colonial boundaries, fueling discontent. They were largely excluded from administrative roles, with the colonial authorities favoring European settlers or imported labor, which limited political influence and economic opportunities for them. Additionally, colonial education and economic systems were designed to serve the colonisers’ needs, offering minimal benefits to Somalis and eroding their cultural practices.

In the 1920s and 1930s, there were no permanent Ethiopian settlements or administration in any Somali inhabited land, only military encampments. Due to native hostility, the Ogaden region was barely occupied by Ethiopian authorities, who exerted little to no presence east of Jijiga, until the Anglo-Ethiopian boundary commission in 1934 and the Wal Wal incident in 1935. The incident at Wal Wal ignited the Second Italo-Ethiopian War and paved the way for Italy’s occupation of Ethiopia. It arose from a dispute over the poorly defined border between Ethiopia and Italian Somaliland. Britain and Ethiopia had established a joint boundary commission to clarify the Somali-Ethiopia border. However, the commission’s work was incomplete, and disagreements persisted, which left the region’s status ambiguous.

By 1936, Italian forces had captured Addis Ababa, leading to the military occupation of Ethiopia and the proclamation of Italian East Africa, which incorporated Ethiopia, Eritrea, and Italian Somaliland. In a bid to gain support among the Somali population, the Italians pushed forth their own vision of the Greater Somalia's realization within Italian East Africa. During World War II, Italian forces invaded and occupied British Somaliland. In 1940, Mussolini boasted to a group of Somalis in Rome that with the conquest of British Somaliland, nearly all Somali lands were united, fulfilling their dream of a union of all Somalis.

“The fires of nationalism among the Somalis were constantly stoked throughout the colonial period, not only by Somali nationalists but also by various colonial powers who through words and deeds seemed to legitimize the concept of "Greater Somalia." Mussolini, for example, saw "La Grande Somalia" as the "jewel" of Italian East Africa, thus justifying Italy's invasion of Ethiopia and the liberation of the Somalis.”

— E. J. Keller, Revolutionary Ethiopia: From Empire to People's Republic

However the British regained control of British Somaliland, liberated Ethiopia from Fascist Italy and conquered Italian Somaliland by 1941. Following World War II, Somali leaders in the Ogaden region of Ethiopia repeatedly put forward demands for self-determination, only to be ignored by both Ethiopia and the United Nations. The Potsdam Conference was held in 1945, where the Allied powers decided to not return Italian Somaliland to Italy. The UN opted instead in 1949 to grant Italy trusteeship of Italian Somaliland for a period of ten years, after which the region would become independent.

Meanwhile, in 1948, under pressure from World War II allies and to the dismay of Somalis, the British returned the Haud (an important grazing area that was presumably "protected" by British treaties with the Somalis in 1884 and 1886) and the Ogaden Region to Ethiopia, based on the Anglo-Ethiopian Treaty in which the British ceded Somali territory to Menelik II in exchange for his help fighting against the Somali clans. Britain included the proviso that the Somali residents would retain their autonomy. Regardless, Ethiopia immediately claimed sovereignty over the Haud region. This prompted an unsuccessful bid by Britain in 1956 to buy back the Somali lands that it had turned over.

In the mid-1950s, Ethiopia gained full control over the Ogaden region for the first time and began incorporating it into Ethiopian imperial administration. Virtually no infrastructure was developed there, with scarcely any paved roads, electricity lines, schools, or hospitals constructed. The Ethiopian presence primarily consisted of soldiers and tax collectors. The Somalis were discriminated against by the ruling Amhara elite, and were poorly integrated into the Ethiopian Empire. In 1958, the UN Trusteeship Council established an arbitration tribunal to resolve the territorial dispute between Ethiopia and Somalia but the effort proved ineffective. The Somalis consistently rejected the 1897 Anglo-Ethiopian delimitation and refused to recognise its legal validity. Growing discontent fueled demands for Somalis to take control of Somali majority areas.

=== Independence ===
A socialist poster from the Somali Democratic Republic showing Somali Region and the rest of Greater Somalia unified as one country

After Somalia’s independence in 1960, successive governments launched a campaign to reclaim what they termed "lost territories," raising the issue with regional and international bodies such as the United Nations. In a meeting with Israeli Defense Minister Moshe Dayan, the Ethiopian Emperor Haile Selassie asserted that the Somali nationalist aspiration for a Greater Somalia was driven by Nasserite agitation, and expressed hope to the Israelis that the Somali Republic itself would eventually be incorporated into the Ethiopian Empire.

The newly formed Somali government and army had felt pressured and obliged to respond to what Somali citizens widely perceived as oppression of their brethren by an Ethiopian military occupation. In a bid to control the population of the region during the 1963 Ogaden revolt, an Ethiopian Imperial Army division based out of Harar torched Somali villages and watering holes were machine gunned by aircraft in order to control the regions overwhelming nomadic population by denying them access to water. The Americans and Israelis assisted the Ethiopians in violently suppressing the Somali nationalist struggle in the Ogaden. In 1964, the first Ethiopian-Somali War erupted along the border, ending in an armistice after two months of interstate fighting.

Britain also granted administration of the Northern Frontier District to Kenyan nationalists. This was despite a 1962 commission report showing 86% of the Somalis in Kenya favouring secession and joining the newly formed Somali Republic. It was an informal plebiscite demonstrating the overwhelming desire of the region's population to join the newly formed Somali Republic.

After Kenya’s independence in 1963, the ethnic Somalis who were natives of the NFD, supported by the Somali Republic, launched the Shifta War to secede from Kenya and join Somalia. The term “shifta” (Swahili for “bandit”) was used by the Kenyans to delegitimise the insurgency. The war ended with a ceasefire in 1967, facilitated by the Organisation of African Unity at the Arusha Conference, where Somalia’s Prime Minister Muhammad Haji Ibrahim Egal agreed to suspend hostilities. However, the conflict left lasting grievances, with Somalis in Kenya still feeling targeted, marginalised and subjected to state suspicion.

In 1966, the Ethiopian imperial government under Haile Salassie imposed martial law in the Ogaden and neighbouring Oromo regions, followed by a number of harsh reprisals against local herders aiming to compel them to abandon their support for insurgents. These measures included confiscation of property, arbitrary arrests, control of water points, and destruction of livestock. In 1973, the Western Somali Liberation Front (WSLF) was formed to mobilise local populations in the region. Somalia backed the WSLF, the Somali Abo Liberation Front (SALF), and the Oromo Liberation Front (OLF) to undermine Ethiopian forces and destabilize the country.

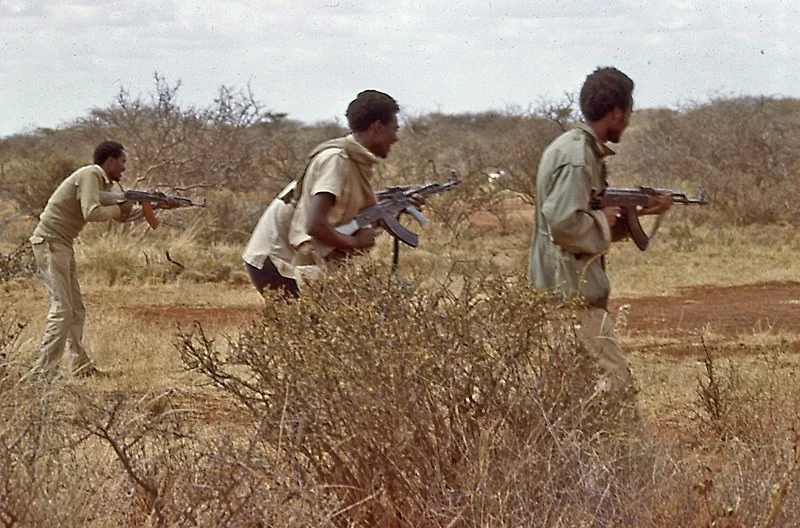
Western Somali Liberation Front (WSLF) militants in the Ogaden War

Between 1977 and 1978, Somalia and Ethiopia waged a war over control of the Ogaden region and its people. The Soviet Union, Cuba, and South Yemen supported Ethiopia’s Derg regime, led by Colonel Mengistu Haile Mariam, deploying nearly 100,000 troops equipped with modern weaponry. This combined force repelled Somali troops back to the border, ultimately leading to the weakening of the Mogadishu based government. In March 1978, President Siad Barre ordered the withdrawal of Somali forces from Ethiopia.

After the war, an estimated 800,000 "Ethiopian Somalis" crossed the border into Somalia where they would be displaced as refugees. The defeat of the WSLF and Somali National Army did not result in the pacification of the Ogaden region. The first major outflow of refugees numbering in the hundreds of thousands were also bombed during their exodus out of the country by the Ethiopian military.

Djibouti gained its independence in 1977, but a referendum was held in 1958 on the eve of Somalia's independence in 1960 to decide whether or not to join the Somali Republic or to remain with France. The referendum turned out in favor of a continued association with France, largely due to a combined "yes" vote by the sizable Afar ethnic group and resident Europeans. However, the majority of those who voted "no" were Somalis who were strongly in favor of joining a united Somalia as had been proposed by Mahmoud Harbi. Harbi was killed in a plane crash two years later, and Hassan Gouled Aptidon, a Somali who campaigned for a yes vote in the referendum of 1958, wound up as Djibouti's first president post-independence (1977–1991).

In 1981, President Siad Barre visited Nairobi and during a meeting with Kenya’s president Daniel arap Moi, asserted that Somalia was suspending its claim to the Northern Frontier District. Following renewed hostilities in the Ogaden region and the 1982 Ethiopian–Somali Border War, the two heads of state, Mengistu Haile Mariam and Siad Barre would meet in 1986 in Djibouti at the founding summit of the Inter-Governmental Authority on Drought and Development (IGADD), leading to a peace treaty signed in 1988. Both parties agreed to respect each other’s territorial integrity.

By the late 1980s, opposition groups, including the Somali National Movement (SNM) in the north, the United Somali Congress (USC) and the Somali Patriotic Movement (SPM) in the south, mobilised against the Siad Barre regime, fuelled by grievances over human rights abuses and economic collapse. While Ethiopia, under President Mengistu, publicly maintained a stance of non-interference in the internal affairs of Somalia, evidence suggests it provided significant support to these groups, albeit covertly or indirectly.

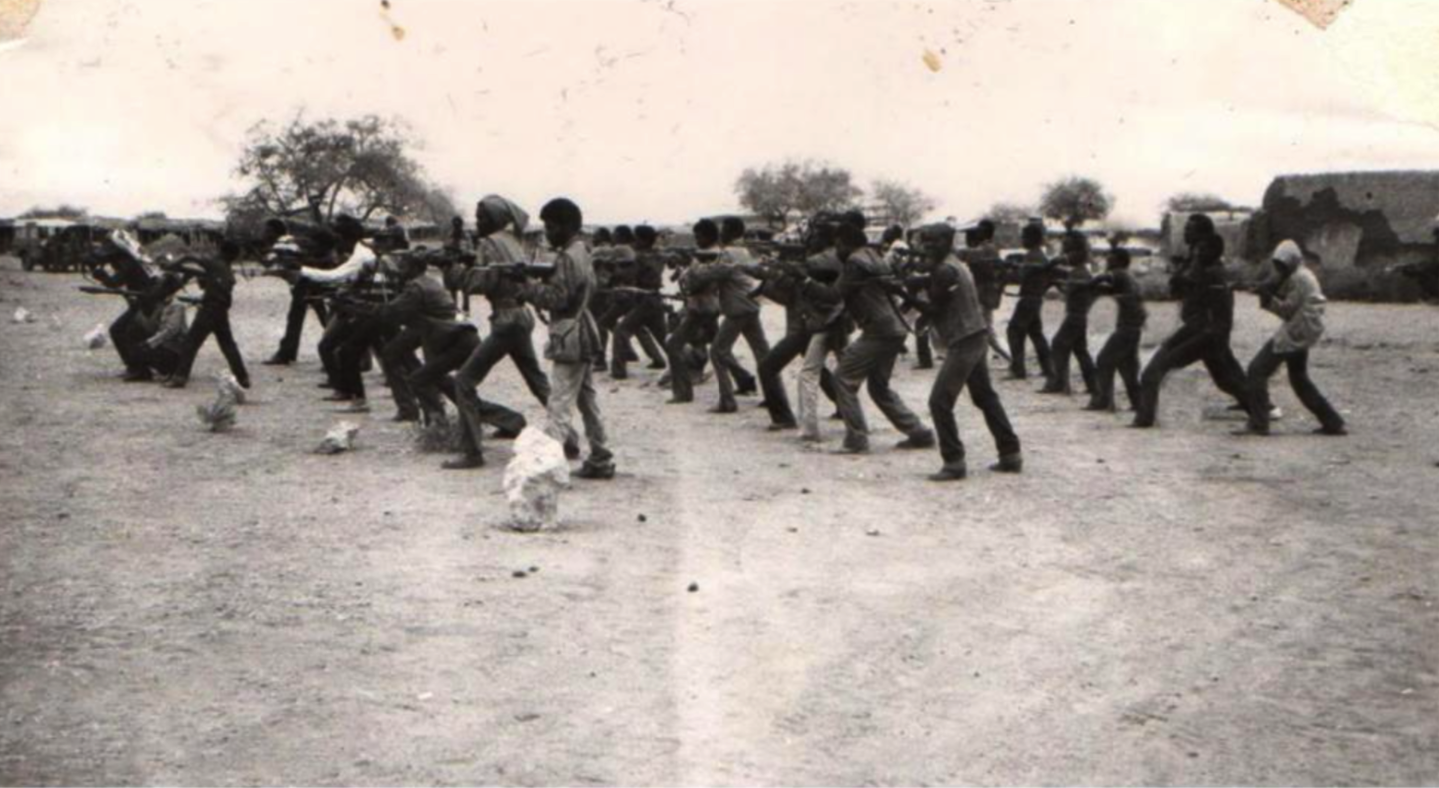
Somali National Movement recruits training for combat in Aware, Ethiopia

The SNM, primarily representing the Isaaq clan operated bases in Ethiopia’s border regions, particularly in Dire Dawa, from the early 1980s. Ethiopia allowed the SNM to establish military bases and conduct guerrilla raids into Somalia, providing logistical support and safe havens until the 1988 agreement, which scaled back overt assistance.

For the USC, led by figures like Mohamed Farrah Aidid, Ethiopia’s support was direct, particularly in the late 1980s. Aidid, a former ambassador, defected and was invited by Mengistu to establish a USC military wing in Ethiopia. From bases near the Ethiopia–Somalia border, Aidid directed operations to topple Barre’s regime. Ethiopian security services also aided Aidid’s rise within the USC by detaining his rival, the interim chairman, at his request, allowing Mohamed Farrah Aidid to further consolidate power.

The rebellions coupled with defections from Barre’s military, and dwindling foreign support, eroded Barre’s control, and while Ethiopia publicly was claiming neutrality, particularly after 1988, its actions proved otherwise—allowing rebel bases, providing logistical support, as well as aiding key figures. By January 1991, USC rebel forces stormed Mogadishu, forcing Barre to flee, ending his 22-year rule, subsequently plunging Somalia into a protracted civil war as rival factions vied for power in the resulting vacuum.

=== Somali Civil War ===
Approximate map of the current phase of the Somali Civil War (Updated March 2026) Somalia: Federal Government of Somalia, the African Union Support and Stabilization Mission in Somalia, the United States, and contested territory Somali Future Council: Government of Puntland Jubaland Dervish Force and the Raskamboni Movement Jihadist insurgent groups: Islamic Wilayat of Somalia (al-Shabaab) and allies Islamic State-backed Somalia Wilayah Somaliland: Self-declared state of Somaliland (For a more detailed map of the current military situation, see here.)

With the start of the Somali Civil War in 1991, the vision of uniting the various historically and predominantly Somali-inhabited areas of the Horn of Africa into a Greater Somalia was temporarily sidelined. Talk of pan-Somali unification movements for the moment took a backseat, as the Republic splintered into a few autonomous smaller regional or clan-based governing zones. The northern regions of the Somali Republic, which previously was a British protectorate, declared independence as the Republic of Somaliland in 1991, shattering the dream of a greater Somalia now that the two regions that previously united split apart.

In 2006, the Islamic Courts Union (ICU) rose to power as the de facto national government following its conquest of the capital and large swathes of Somalia. The Ogaden National Liberation Front (ONLF), an insurgent group fighting for the independence of the Ogaden, maintained a covert relationship with the ICU and regarded it as an ally. The region was at the heart of the dispute between the ICU and Ethiopian governments. Following their ascent to power, senior ICU officials accused Ethiopia of mistreating the Somalis under its rule and declared that the region could not be forgotten. A strong state not dependent on Addis Ababa was perceived as a security threat, given that the unification of the Somalis had been a core aim of most governments in Mogadishu. Consequently, the Ethiopian government heavily backed the formation of the Transitional Federal Government (TFG) on the grounds that it would give up its claims to the Ogaden region.

After the ICU was toppled during the 2006-2009 Ethiopian invasion of Somalia, the Islamist militia group Al-Shabaab soon rose to power and became a powerful insurgent entity in the country. The group has voiced support for a Greater Somalia, describing the Ethiopia–Somalia border as "artificial."

== See also ==
- North Eastern Province
- Pan-nationalism
- Irredentism
- Ethnic nationalism
- Somali nationalism

== Bibliography ==
- Pierre Petrides, The Boundary Question between Ethiopia and Somalia. New Delhi, 1983.
- Abdi, Mohamed Mohamud (2021). A History of the Ogaden (Western Somali) Struggle for Self-Determination: Part I (1300-2007) (2nd ed.). UK: Safis Publishing. ISBN 978-1-906342-39-5. OCLC 165059930.
- Drysdale, John (1964). The Somali Dispute. New York: Frederick A. Praeger Inc. LCCN 64-13122. OCLC 467147.
- Erlich, Haggai (2014). Alliance and Alienation: Ethiopia and Israel in the Days of Haile Selassie. The Red Sea Press. ISBN 9781569023891.
- FitzGibbon, Louis (1985). The Evaded Duty. London: Rex Collings. ISBN 0860362094. OCLC 15018961.
- Lewis, I.M., ed. (1983). Nationalism & Self Determination in the Horn of Africa. Ithaca Press. ISBN 978-0-903729-93-2.
- Weitzberg, Keren (2017). We Do Not Have Borders: Greater Somalia and the Predicaments of Belonging in Kenya. Ohio University Press. ISBN 978-0-8214-4595-2.
