= Constitution of Somalia =

The Provisional Constitution of the Federal Republic of Somalia (Somali: Dastuurka Jamhuuriyadda Federaalka Soomaaliya) is the supreme law of Somalia. It provides the legal foundation for the existence of the Federal Republic and source of legal authority. It sets out the rights and duties of its citizens, and defines the structure of government. The Provisional Constitution was adopted on August 1, 2012 by a National Constitutional Assembly in Mogadishu, Banaadir.

Somalia's provisional Constitution provides for a parliamentary system of government, with the President of Somalia as head of state and an appointed Prime Minister as head of government. The country has a bicameral legislature, which consists of the Senate (upper house) and the House of the People (lower house). Together, they make up the Federal Parliament of Somalia.

== Previous constitutions ==
On June 20, 1961, and through a popular referendum, the people of Somalia ratified a new Constitution, which was first drafted in 1960. The Constitution of 1961 had provided for parliamentary democracy, with the Prime Minister and Council of Ministers (cabinet) being drawn from the membership of the legislature. The legislature also elected the head of state, or president of the republic.

=== Somali Democratic Republic ===
In 1969, following the assassination of Somalia's second president, Abdirashid Ali Shermarke, the military staged a coup on October 21 (the day after Shermarke's funeral) and took over office. The Supreme Revolutionary Council (SRC) that assumed power was led by Major General Siad Barre. Shortly afterwards, Barre became the head of the SRC. The SRC subsequently renamed the country the Somali Democratic Republic, arrested members of the former government, banned political parties, dissolved the parliament and the Supreme Court, and suspended the Constitution.

A new communist state constitution was ratified on August 25, 1979, through a popular referendum, under which elections for a People's Assembly were held. However, Barre's Somali Revolutionary Socialist Party politburo continued to rule. The Constitution of 1979 provided for a presidential system under which the president served as both head of state and head of government. As head of government, the president selected the members of the Council of Ministers, which he chaired. The Constitution of 1979 initially called for the president to be elected to a six-year, renewable term of office by a two-thirds majority vote of the legislature. After Barre's overthrow, a provisional government called for a new Constitution to replace the 1979 document that had been the law of the land at the time of his ouster.

== Federal Republic of Somalia ==
=== Constitutional institutions ===
The Constitution of the Federal Republic of Somalia promotes human rights, the rule of law, general standards of international law, justice, participatory consultative and inclusive government, the separation of powers between the legislature, executive and an independent judiciary, in order to ensure accountability, efficiency and responsiveness to the interests of the people.

The Federal Republic of Somalia is a federal republic with a parliamentary system, where much of the executive power lies with the prime minister.

==== Presidency ====
The Somali federal president is the head of state. The presidential powers of the head of state are far reaching and are carried out in accordance with the Constitution and the other laws of the Federal Republic of Somalia. These powers include appointing the head of the executive (Prime Minister), serving as Commander-in-Chief of the Armed Forces and declaring a state of emergency and war.

==== Executive branch ====
The executive power of the federal government is vested in the federal cabinet. The Prime Minister is the head of government. They head the federal Cabinet, consisting of ministers appointed on the Prime Minister's suggestion. The Prime Minister is elected for a full term of 4 years and can only be dismissed by parliament electing a successor in a vote of no confidence.

==== Judicial branch ====
Judicial authority of the Federal Republic is vested in the courts. The judiciary is independent of the legislative and executive branches of government whilst fulfilling its judicial functions. It can declare statutes as null and void if they are in violation of the Federal Constitution.

The national court structure consists of:

- The Constitutional Court
- The Federal Government level courts
- The Federal Member State level courts

==== Legislative branch ====
The main body of the legislative branch is Somalia's bicameral parliament, the Federal Parliament, which enacts federal legislation except laws related to the annual budget. Each member of the Federal Parliament has the right to initiate legislation, as does the cabinet. The lower house comprises 275 MPs, while the upper house is capped at 54 representatives.

== Constitutional crisis ==
A constitutional crisis emerged in Somalia on 30 March 2024, when the Federal Parliament of Somalia approved a series of constitutional amendments aimed at establishing a more "stable political system". These changes included a return to universal suffrage, replacing the decades-old clan-based electoral system, and granting the president authority to appoint the prime minister without requiring parliamentary approval. Critics argued that the reforms significantly expanded executive power. In response, the semi-autonomous state of Puntland announced the following day that it was withdrawing its recognition and confidence in the Federal Government of Somalia. It called for a "mutually accepted Somali constitution that is subject to a public referendum" and declared that, until such a constitution is in place, it would operate independently.
