= 1979 Somali constitutional referendum =

- 25 August 1979

Results
Choice	Votes	%
Yes	3,597,592	99.78%
No	7,898	0.22%

A constitutional referendum was held in Somalia on 25 August 1979. The new constitution replaced the one approved in 1961, and introduced a one-party state with a presidential system of government. It was approved by 99.78% of voters.

== Results ==
Choice	Votes	%
For	3,597,592	99.78
Against	7,898	0.22
Total	3,605,490	100.00
Source: African Elections Database
