= Ahmed Mohamed Obsiye =

Somali politician (1914–1984)

The Honourable Ahmed Mohamed Absiye
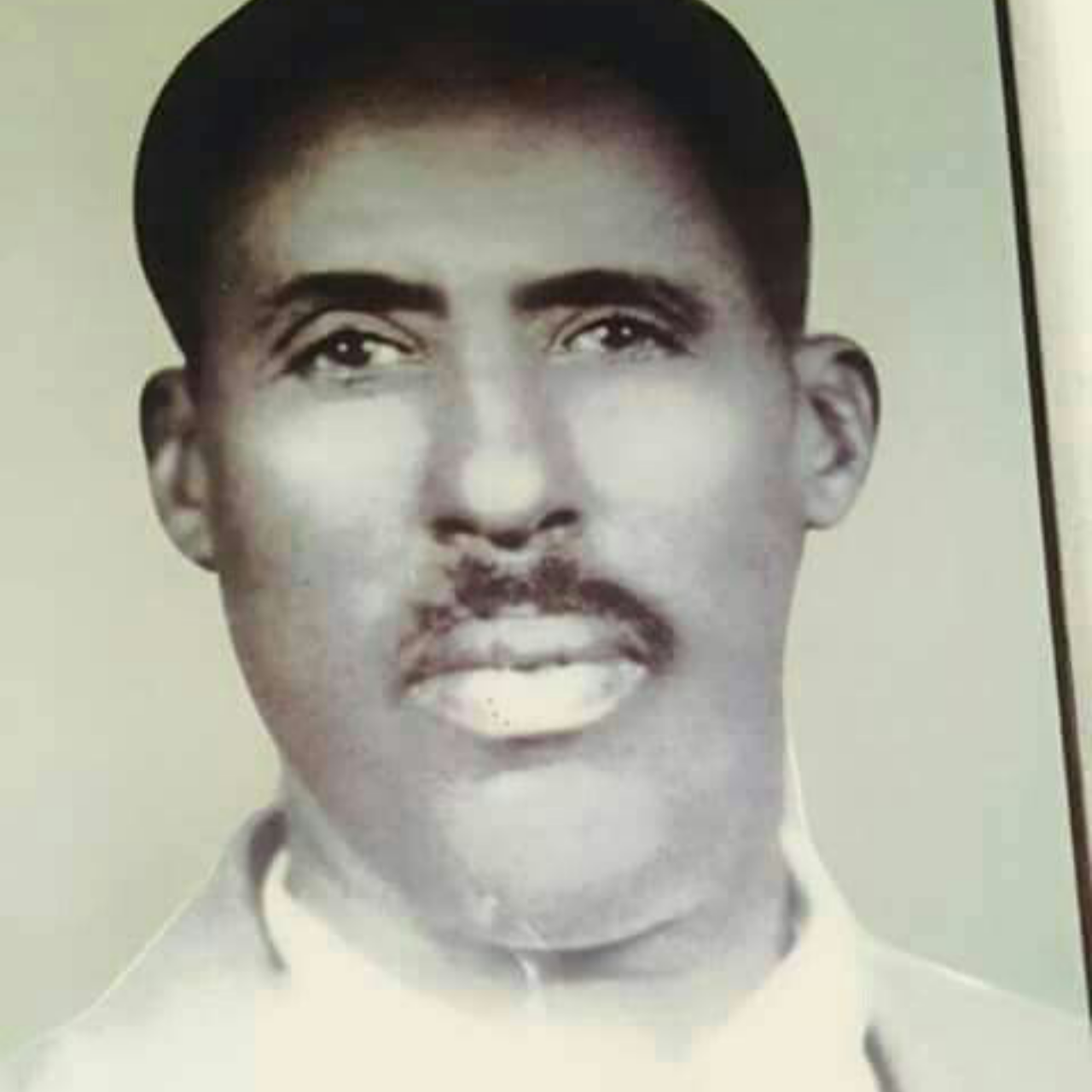

3rd Speaker of the Parliament of Somalia
- In office 26 May 1964 – 1 March 1967
- Preceded by: Jama Abdullahi Qalib
- Succeeded by: Sheikh Mukhtar Mohamed Hussein

Personal details
- Born: 1914 Hargeisa
- Died: 1984 (aged 69–70)
- Party: Somali Youth League

Ahmed Mohamed Obsiye (Somali: Axmed Maxamed Cabsiiye), was a Somali politician and senior member of the Somali Youth League, he served as speaker of the Somali Parliament during the Somali Republic's early civilian administration. He hailed from Adan Issa subdivisions of the Issa Musse subclan of the Isaaq Somali.
