= Abdulkadir Mohamed Nur =

Somali politician

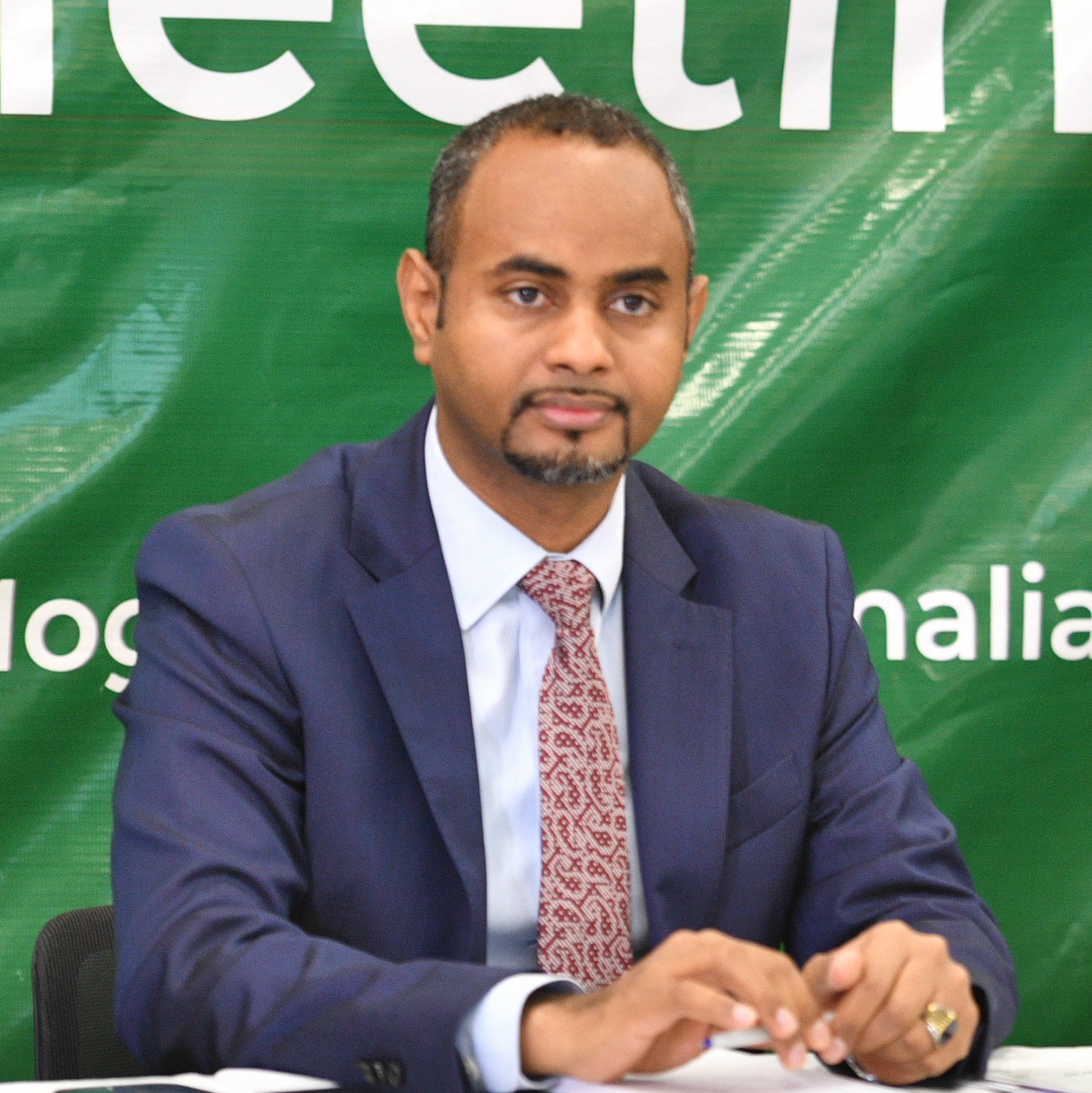
- Abdulkadir in 2022

Speaker of the House of the People of Somalia
- Incumbent
- Assumed office 10 August 2026
- President: Hassan Sheikh Mohamud
- Prime Minister: Hamza Abdi Barre
- Preceded by: Aden Madobe

Minister of Ports and Maritime Transport of Somalia
- In office 17 March 2025 – 10 August 2026
- President: Hassan Sheikh Mohamud
- Prime Minister: Hamza Abdi Barre
- Preceded by: Abdullahi Ahmed Jama

Minister of Defence of Somalia
- In office 26 December 2021 – 17 March 2025
- Succeeded by: Ahmed Moalim Fiqi

Minister of Justice of Somalia
- In office September 2020 – 26 December 2021

Senior Adviser to the Speaker of the House of the People, Somali Federal Parliament
- In office August 2018 – 2020

Personal details
- Born: 21 October 1985 (age 41) Somalia

Abdulkadir Mohamed Nur Jama (Somali: Cabdulqaadir Maxamed Nuur Jaamac) is a Somali politician who serves as the Speaker of the House of the People of the Federal Parliament of Somalia since 10 August 2026. He previously served as the Minister of Ports and Maritime Transport from March 2025 to August 2026, and as the Minister of Defense from 2021 to 2025.

== Life ==
Abdulkadir Mohamed Nur is a Somali politician and diplomat who currently serves as the Speaker of the House of the People of the Federal Parliament of Somalia, having been elected on 10 August 2026. Prior to his election as Speaker, he served as the Minister of Ports and Maritime Transport from March 2025 to August 2026, and as the Minister of Defense in the Federal Government of Somalia from December 2021 to March 2025. During his tenure as Defense Minister, he was particularly noted for his firm commitment to the fight against the terrorist group Al-Shabaab, aiming to strengthen the country's security forces and weaken the group's influence. Prior to these roles, he served as the Minister of Justice from September 2020 to December 2021.

Nur has also held several key positions in the Somali government, including as the Senior Adviser to the Speaker of the House of the People in the Somali Federal Parliament from August 2018 to 2020. Earlier in his career, Nur played a significant role in the country's national security apparatus, serving as the Deputy Director of the National Intelligence and Security Agency (NISA) from May 2017 to August 2018, and acting as the Acting Director of NISA from October 2017 to February 2018.

His diplomatic career includes his tenure as Chargé d'Affaires at the Somali Embassy in Ankara, Turkey, from September 2016 to May 2017. He also served as First Counsellor at the same embassy from September 2015 to May 2017. Prior to these roles, he held the positions of First Secretary (2012–2015) and Second Secretary (2009–2012) at the Somali Embassy in Ankara, Turkey.

In addition to his diplomatic and governmental roles, Nur has held security-related positions, including his earlier work as the Head of Security at Villa Somalia, the Presidential Palace.

Abdulkadir Mohamed Nur played an active role in the signing of the Defense and Economic Cooperation Framework Agreement on February 8, 2024, with Turkish Defense Minister Yaşar Güler in Ankara, Turkey. The agreement aims to bolster Somalia's fight against terrorism and strengthen military-financial cooperation between the two nations. The deepening relationship between Somalia and Turkey has been ongoing, especially since Turkish President Recep Tayyip Erdoğan's visit to Somalia in 2011.

Nur holds a Bachelor's Degree in International Relations from the Political Science Department of Ankara University, also known as Mekteb-i Mülkiye, one of Turkey's most prestigious institutions for political science studies. He is fluent in Somali, English, and Turkish.

Nur is married and has three children.
