= Haji Farah Ali Omar =

Somali politician (1907-?)

Haji Farah Ali Omar الحاج فرح علي عمر

Minister for Economic Affairs of Somalia
- In office 1956–1960

Personal details
- Born: 1907 Jamaame, Somalia

Haji Farah Ali Omar (Somali: Xaaji Faarax Cali Cumar, Arabic: الحاج فرح علي عمر) (1907 – unknown) was born in the town of Jamaame, situated in the Mudug region of Somalia, and was a Somali politician. He was a senior official in the government of the Trust Territory of Somalia and later served as Minister of Economic Affairs in Somalia's post-independence civilian administration. He is also credited with creating the first Somali Shilling and the printing offices to mint and produce the coins.

== Biography ==
Omar was born in 1907 in the town of Jamaame, situated in the Jubaland region of Somalia. Hon. Haji Farah was born in Jamaame in 1907 to parents from the middle region (Mudug). Farah spent his early years with his mother and after she died he lived with his father and stepmother briefly until he finished his primary education and before moving to Egypt for secondary and tertiary education. Farah succeeded in his studies and eventually got a scholarship to Al-Azhar University in Cairo, Egypt where he studied politics and diplomacy. He hails from Habargidir(sacad clan -indhoyar subclan). Upon his return to Somalia, he married his lifetime partner, Aisha Samatar. They had three daughters together: Halima Farah, Fatima Farah and Dahabo Farah. Omar did not father any sons. His daughters followed his academic footsteps to become graduates from Al-Azhar University in Cairo. Halima graduated from the faculty of education, Fatima studied journalism, while Dahabo studied agriculture.

Haji Farah Ali Omar later retired from politics, turning his interest to his farmlands in southern Somalia, just outside Qoryooley where he lived before his demise. He was a loving father, husband, grandfather, and an inspirational figure for much of his family, friends and the people of Somalia. He died in Mogadishu in the mid 80s.

== Political career ==
Omar served as a Party Representative in the Territorial Council from 1952 to 1956. He was later appointed Minister for Economic Affairs in the Trust Territory of Somalia (1956) and the post-independence civilian government led by President Aden Abdullah Osman Daar. As a member of the government both before and after Somalia's independence, Omar was a member of various missions to the United States and to the United Nations.

Since the 50's and in continual use till the Civil War, Haji Farah is credited with creating the first Somali Shilling and the printing offices to mint and produce the coins in Mogadishu under various departments.
