= Saida Haji Bashir Ismail =

Saida Haji Bashir Ismail سعيدة حاج بشير اسماعيل
- thumbnail

Vice-Minister of Finance of Somalia
- In office 2000–2004

Personal details
- Political party: Transitional National Government

Saida Haji Bashir Ismail (Somali: Saciida Xaaji Bashiir Ismaaciil, Arabic: سعيدة حاجي بشير اسماعيل) is a Somali politician.

== Biography ==
Saida Ismail is the daughter of Haji Bashir Ismail Yusuf, the first President of the Somali National Assembly during Somalia's early civilian administration. Her brother, Abdullahi Haji Bashir Ismail, is a Deputy Director-General of Somali Immigration & Naturalization, One of the high rank Senior Somali Administration Officers, as well as a writer of Politics and History.

Ismail later also entered politics, serving as Vice-Minister of Finance in the Transitional National Government (TNG) between 2000 and 2004.
