= Haji Bashir =

President of Somalia (1912–1984)

The Honourable Haji Bashir
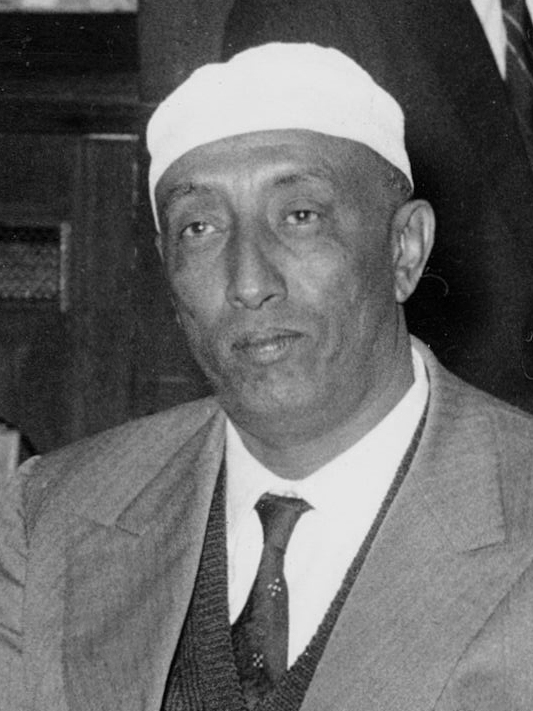
- Yusuf in 1961

Minister of Health and Labour of the Somali Republic
- In office 1966–1967
- Prime Minister: Abdirizak Haji Hussein

President of the Somali National Assembly
- In office 1 July 1960 – mid-July 1960
- Prime Minister: Abdirashid Ali Shermarke
- Preceded by: Aden Abdulle Osman
- Succeeded by: Jama Abdullahi Qalib

Personal details
- Born: 1912 Hobyo, Italian Somaliland
- Died: 2 January 1984 (aged 72) Cairo, Egypt
- Party: Somali Youth League

Haji Bashir Ismail Yusuf (Somali: Xaaji Bashiir Ismaaciil Yuusuf, Arabic: حاجي بشير اسماعيل يوسف; 1912–1984), commonly referred to as Haji Bashir, was a Somali politician. He was a prominent Somali Youth League (SYL) member and the first President of the Somali National Assembly during the Somali Republic's early civilian administration.

== Personal life ==
=== Early years ===
Yusuf was born in 1912 in the town of Hobyo (Obbia), situated in the north-central Mudug province of Somalia.

Yusuf hailed from the Osman Mohamoud sub-clan of the Majeerteen, Harti, Darod.

=== Family ===
Yusuf's daughter Saida Haji Bashir Ismail later also entered politics. She served as Somali Finance Vice-Minister in the Transitional National Government (TNG) between 2000 and 2004. His son Abdullahi Hagi Bashir Ismail is a First Deputy Director-General of Somali Immigration and Naturalization, One of the high rank Senior Somali Administration Officers, as well as a writer of politics and history. Additionally, Yusuf was also a relative of the Somali-Italian actor and musician Jonis Bashir, and the Somali Politician and businessman Haji Mohamed Yasin Ismail.

== Career ==
Yusuf was a prominent member of the Somali Youth League (SYL), the country's first political party. He joined the organization in 1943, when the SYL was founded as the Somali Youth Club (SYC). The SYL's nationalist constituents were strongly influenced by the Darawiish rebellion at the turn of the 20th century of Diiriye Guure, and Mohammed Abdullah Hassan ("Mad Mullah"), the emir of Diiriye Guure.

In an administrative capacity, Yusuf initially worked in the parliament of the Trust Territory of Somaliland as an MP (Deputato) for the northeastern town of Bosaso. He was also part of a six-member Somali Youth League delegation who made an appeal for early independence before the Four-Power Commission.

On 1 July 1960, Somalia's independence day, the Somali National Assembly headed by Yusuf approved the act of union, joining the Trust Territory of Somaliland (former Italian Somaliland) with the former British Somaliland protectorate. This established the Somali Republic, and Yusuf was appointed the first President of the Somali National Assembly. He was succeeded in office by Jama Abdullahi Qalib.

From mid-July 1960 to mid-1966, Yusuf was elected a Vice-President of the Somali National Assembly, where he worked alongside Ahmed Gumanc.

Yusuf was subsequently appointed Minister of Health and Labour in 1966. He formed a key part of the Somali Republic's early civilian administration.

After a long career in Somali politics, Yusuf eventually retired to Cairo, Egypt. He died there on 2 January 1984, at the age of 72.

== See also ==
- Yasin Haji Osman Sharmarke
- Aden Abdulle Osman
- Abdirizak Haji Hussein
- Abdulrahim Abby Farah
