= Yasin Haji Osman Sharmarke =

Somali activist and politician

Yasin Haji Osman Sharmarke ياسين الحاج عثمان شارماركي
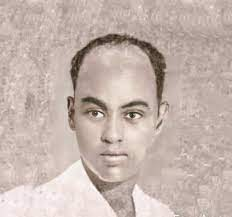
- Born: Somalia
- Occupations: Politician, activist
- Title: Secretary-General Somali Youth League

Yasin Haji Osman Sharmarke (Somali: Yaasiin Haaji 'Ismaan Shirmarke, Arabic: ياسين الحاج عثمان شارماركي) was a Somali political figure and activist.

== Biography ==
Sharmarke was born to the Osman Mahamoud sub-clan of the larger Majeerteen. He was the leader and founder of the Somali Youth League (SYL, established 1943), Somalia's first political party. Having also been instrumental in the organization's creation, Sharmarke and other early SYL nationalists were strongly influenced by the Darawiish of Diiriye Guure and Sayyid Mohammed Abdullah Hassan, emir of Diiriye Guure. Sharmarke died in June 1947.

== See also ==
- Haji Bashir Ismail Yussuf
- Somali Youth League
- Mohammed Abdullah Hassan
