= Aden Adde =

Somali politician; President of Somalia from 1960 to 1967

The Honourable Aden Adde
- ادم عبد الله عثمان دعر
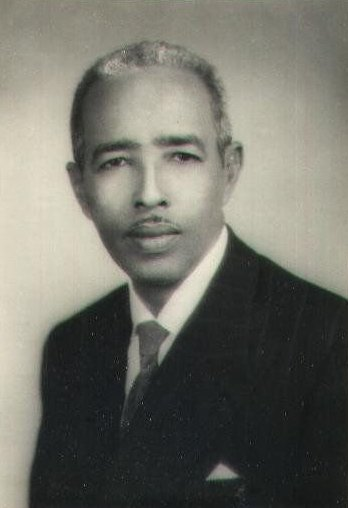
- Adde in the 1950s

1st President of the Somali Republic
- In office 1 July 1960 – 6 July 1967
- Prime Minister: Mohamed Haji Ibrahim Egal; Abdirashid Ali Sharmarke; Abdirizak Haji Hussein
- Preceded by: Post established
- Succeeded by: Abdirashid Ali Shermarke

1st Chairman of the National Legislative Assembly
- In office 29 February 1956 – 1 July 1960
- Preceded by: Office established
- Succeeded by: Jama Abdullahi Qalib

Personal details
- Born: 9 December 1908 Beledweyne, Italian Somalia (now Somalia)
- Died: 8 June 2007 (aged 98) Nairobi, Kenya
- Party: Somali Youth League (SYL)
- Spouse: Aisha Elmi Mataan
- Children: Abdulkadir, Mohamed, Osman, Said, Fatima, Omar, Caliya, and Abucar

Aden Abdulle Osman Da’ar (Somali: Aadan Cabdulle Cismaan Dacar, Arabic: آدم عبد الله عثمان دعر) (9 December 1908 – 8 June 2007), popularly known as Aden Adde, was a Somali politician who served as the first president of the Somali Republic from 1 July 1960 to 6 July 1967. After losing the 1967 presidential election to Abdirashid Ali Shermarke, he peacefully relinquished office to his elected successor, becoming the first African leader to voluntarily give up the presidency after losing an election. He had previously served in the Somali Youth League in 1944.

In 1946, he was named Secretary of the party's section in Beledweyne, Somali Republic. In 1951, the Mudug Regional Council appointed him for the Regional Council, and two years later, he became Vice President of the Regional Council. From 1954 until 1956, he was the President of the Somali Youth League. He was re-elected in May 1958, and he continued to hold this position simultaneously along with that of Speaker of the Legislative Assembly until 1960.

Osman Daar was born in Beledweyne, Somali Republic. He studied at government schools, and worked as a community organizer. Somalia was colonized by the Italian government from 1889 to 1941. From 1929 to 1941, he served in the Italian Colonial Administration advocating for Somalia's independence from colonization. He was a proponent for the unity of all Somalis.

In 1960, Osman Daar garnered national attention, and won the favor of the Somali people. He was formally and democratically elected as the first president of the Somali Republic on 1 July 1960, on which date the United Nations recognised Somalia's independence, and subsequently united with the former British protectorate of British Somaliland, which had already obtained its independence on 26 June 1960. His administration was focused on dismantling the legacy of colonialism and fostering unity among the Somali people.

== Early life and career ==
Daar was born on 9 December 1908 in Beledweyne, situated in the south-central Hiraan region of Somalia. He hailed from the Udejeen, Abdile Afarah clan of Hawiye. He was an orphan, who lost his parents at a young age. Daar, was an avid reader, and self taught on many subjects. He spoke Arabic, Somali, Italian and English.

== Political career ==
=== Somali Youth League ===
Daar joined the incipient Somali Youth League (SYL) political party in 1944, a nationalist organization that campaigned for an independent Somalia. Quickly rising through the ranks, he became the local secretary of the SYL's Beledweyne branch in 1946. A decade later, he became Chairman of the National Legislative Assembly, and would eventually lead the SYL itself two years afterwards.

=== Presidency ===
By the time Somalia gained its independence in 1960, Daar had attained widespread prominence as a nationalist figure. In short order, he was elected the country's first President, a position he would assume from 1960 to 1967. During his tenure, he proactively pursued an irredentist national policy for the restoration of lost Somali territories. Notable incidents include the 1964 Ethiopian–Somali Border War, the Shifta War of Kenya, the Front de Libération de la Côte des Somalis battle for Djiboutian Independence as well as support for the ELF in Eritrea and the Bale Revolt of the Oromo in Ethiopia. His rivals in Kenya and Ethiopia had subsequently signed a defence pact in 1965 in order to curb what they deemed as expansion on their doorstep. In line with these policies, President Aden also enrolled Somalia into a number of organisations to advocate for the freedom and liberties of all colonised nations such as the Non-Aligned Movement, the Organisation of African Unity and the World Muslim Congress in which Somalia hosted the Congress' 6th conference in 1966. Notable countries which Somalia in his time advocated for and supported with men or material include South Africa and Palestine during the Six Day War.

Somalia under President Aden pursued modest economic planning to improve domestic revenue. His publicised First Five Year Plan (1963-1967) demonstrated its simple development strategy concentrated on a handful of projects: an increased output of sugar through expanding the productive capacity of the existing factory at Jowhar; the development of meat packing, fish processing, milk and dairy products, textiles, and a few other industries; the construction or improvement of a number of roads; building three seaports at Kismayo, Berbera, and Mogadiscio; the expansion of irrigation for crops and fodder; the formation of a number of state farms; certain improvements in social services, including education and health. Sectoral allocations of planned investment outlays reflected a greater priority for physical infrastructure than agricultural development or population settlement. Though the Plan was essentially a public expenditure programme, it also gave considerable encouragement to private enterprise, offering incentives in the form of protection, exemption from certain taxes for a limited period and the grant of loans on favourable terms to those firms prepared to invest in industries which have a reasonable scope for becoming profitable and the establishment of which is desirable in the national interest.

In the 1967 presidential election, Aden was defeated by Abdirashid Ali Shermarke, his former Prime Minister. His term as president ended on July 6, 1967. Aden accepted the loss graciously, making history as the first head of state in Africa (excluding Liberia) to peacefully hand over power to a democratically elected successor.

Shermarke was assassinated two years later by one of his own bodyguards. The slaying led to an unopposed, bloodless coup d'état by the Somali Army on 21 October 1969, the day after Shermarke's funeral. Spearheading the putsch was Major General Muhammad Siad Barre, who at the time commanded the army.

=== Manifesto ===
In 1990, with the start of the civil war, Daar along with former Minister of Information Ismail Jim'ale Osoble, former Minister of Education Hassan Ali Mire, former Minister of Interior Haji Muse Boqor and about 100 other Somali politicians signed a manifesto expressing concern over the violence and advocating reconciliation. Daar was summarily arrested, and remained imprisoned until the ultimate collapse of Barre's regime the following year.

== Assassination attempt ==
December 1961, Somali authorities announced the arrest of five agents allegedly working for the Ethiopian Government. According to contemporary press reports, the group had travelled to Hargeisa ahead of a planned visit by President Aden Abdulle Osman and were found carrying hand-grenades, bundles of political leaflets, and a substantial sum of money.

The leaflets printed in Arabic called for the creation of two separate Somali governments with a defined border, demanded separate representation at the United Nations. One detainee, Mohamed Haji Dirir, stated at a press conference that the men had been equipped and instructed by the Ethiopian Governor of Jigjiga at Merane Menda.

== Later years ==
After his release, Daar spent the better part of his later years on his farm in Janale, in southern Somalia.

On 22 May 2007, it was erroneously reported that he had died in a hospital in Nairobi, Kenya. He was, however, in critical condition and on life support. Daar died in hospital on 8 June 2007, at the age of 98.

The Transitional Federal Government, then headed by former President of Somalia Abdullahi Yusuf Ahmed, declared 21 days of mourning, complete with a national memorial service, and issued a statement that Daar would receive a state funeral. It also renamed Mogadishu International Airport to Aden Adde International Airport in his honor.

== See also ==
- Somali Youth League
- Haji Bashir Ismail Yusuf
