= Jama Abdullahi Qalib =

Somalian politician

The Honourable Jama Abdullahi Qalib
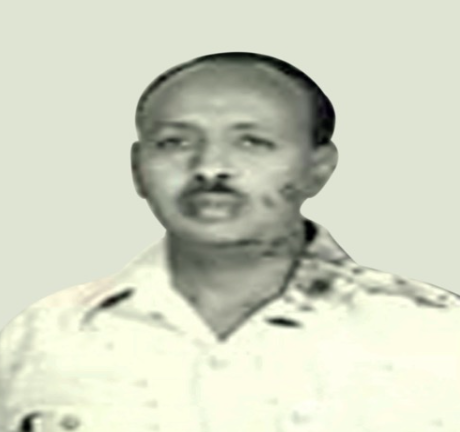

2nd Speaker of the Parliament of Somalia
- In office 26 July 1960 – 26 May 1964
- Preceded by: Haji Bashir Ismail Yusuf
- Succeeded by: Ahmed Mohamed Obsiye

Personal details
- Born: 1930 Hargeisa, Somalia
- Died: 2015 (aged 84–85) Lusaka, Zambia
- Party: Somali Youth League

Jama Abdullahi Qalib (Somali: Jaamac cabdullahi qaalib, 1930–2015) was a Somali politician who was a senior member of the Somali Youth League, and served as speaker of the Somali Parliament during the Somali Republic's early civilian administration between 1960 and 1964. He was also a Speaker of parliament 1979 – 1982.

== Life and career ==
Qalib was born in Hargeisa, in northern Somalia, in 1930. He died in Lusaka, Zambia in 2015.
