= Shidōkan =

Shidōkan may refer to:

- Shōrin-ryū Shidōkan, the main branch of Shorin-ryū style of Okinawan karate
- Shidōkan Karate, Japanese hybrid fighting karate, known as "The Triathlon of Martial Arts"
