= Sheikh Mukhtar Mohamed Hussein =

Somali politician (1912–2012)

The Honourable Mukhtar Mohamed Hussein مختار محمد حسين
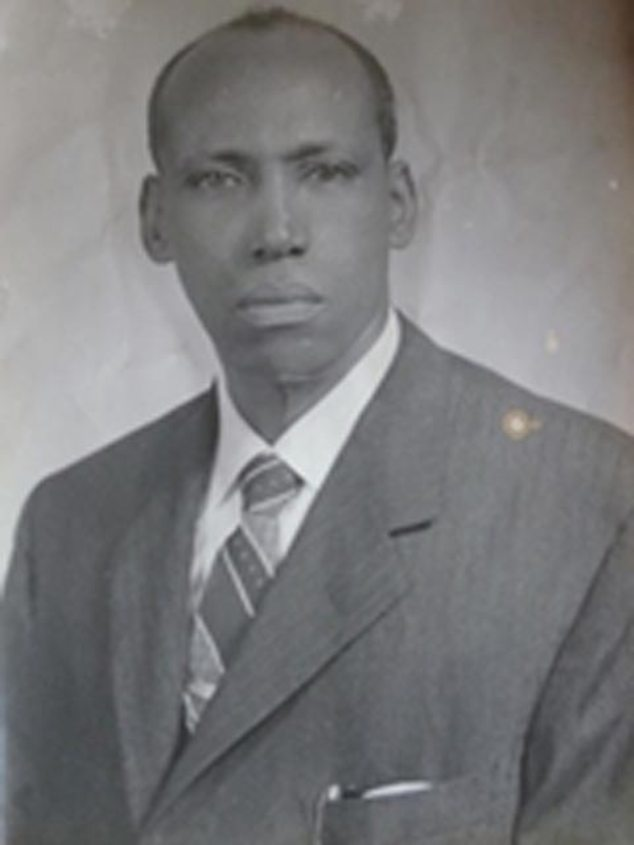
- Hussein in the 1960s

President of Somalia
- Acting
- In office 15 October 1969 – 21 October 1969
- Prime Minister: Mohamed Haji Ibrahim Egal
- Preceded by: Abdirashid Ali Shermarke
- Succeeded by: Mohamed Siad Barre

4th Speaker of the National Assembly of the Somali Republic
- In office March 1967 – October 1969
- Preceded by: Ahmed Mohamed Obsiye

Personal details
- Born: 1912 Huddur, Italian Somaliland
- Died: 12 June 2012 (aged 100) Nairobi, Kenya
- Party: Somali Youth League (SYL)
- Spouse(s): Baar Ismaan and Fadumo Meyre

Sheikh Mukhtar Mohamed Hussein (Somali: Sheekh Mukhtaar Maxamed Xuseen, Arabic: الشيخ محمد حسين مختار; 1912–12 June 2012) was a Somali politician and the Speaker of the Parliament of the Somali Republic, and later briefly an Acting President in 1969.

== Early life ==
Hussein was born into a Hadame family (part of the larger Rahaweyn clan), in the central town of Xuddur in the Bakool region.

== Politics ==
In 1946, Hussein joined the burgeoning, nationalist party of the Somali Youth Club (which later changed its name to the Somali Youth League). He served the SYL's head office in what was then known as Upper Jubba, which included several current regions of Southwestern Somalia.

He died in Nairobi, Kenya in 2012 at about 100 years old. He was accorded a state funeral by the government in Mogadishu, Somalia, and was buried there on June 15, 2012.
