= 1961 Somali constitutional referendum =

- 20 June 1961

Results
Choice	Votes	%
Yes	1,756,216	90.56%
No	183,000	9.44%
Valid votes	1,939,216	99.53%
Invalid or blank votes	9,132	0.47%
Total votes	1,948,348	100.00%

A constitutional referendum was held in Somalia on 20 June 1961 to vote on the new constitution for the country created the previous year by the union of the State of Somaliland and the Trust Territory of Somaliland. It was approved by 91% of voters.

In the territory of former State of Somaliland, the Somali National League (SNL) party encouraged a boycott of the referendum, and 60% of the approximately 100,000 votes from the area opposed the constitution.

The SNL boycott of the referendum stemmed mainly, not from disagreement with procedural or substantive aspects of the document, but rather from the disgruntlement of political leaders who had failed to gain tangible political rewards, especially in the new Somali cabinet. Outside of the Isaaq clan, which was the main base of support for the SNL, the constitution enjoyed near-universal support in the north by the Dir and Darod minorities. The majority Dir and Darod northern cities of Borama and Las Anod voted yes in the referendum, with approval rates of 96 percent and 82 percent, respectively.

== Conduct ==
More votes were cast in Wanlaweyn, a small town in southern Somalia, than in the entirety of Somaliland. This created a climate of distrust and a new term for southerners called "Wanla Weyn". The district commissioner of Wanlaweyn was however promptly sacked and international observers considered it generally free and fair outside of Wanlaweyn and Adale.

== Results ==
Choice	Votes	%
For	1,756,216	90.56
Against	183,000	9.44
Total	1,939,216	100.00
Valid votes	1,939,216	99.53
Invalid/blank votes	9,132	0.47
Total votes	1,948,348	100.00
Source: Middle East Institute

== Aftermath ==
The Greater Somalia League, Somali National League and United Somali Party petitioned the High Court against the outcome. However, the constitution was ratified on 1 July, although the referendum results were only approved by the High Court on 4 July.

In the south, Sheikh Ali Jimale, the runner-up in Somalia's first presidential election, similarly vigorously campaigned against the referendum over the appointment of Abdirashid Ali Sharmarke as prime minister instead of his clansman Abdullahi Issa. This led his home region of Hiran to overwhelmingly reject the constitution. In fact there were more opposing votes to the referendum in the southern region of Hiran than in the entirety of the north.

In May 1963, Jimale and SNL leader Muhammad Haji Ibrahim Egal along with 20 other members of the National Assembly formed the Somali National Congress (SNC) to oppose the ruling Somali Youth League (SNL). Thus, by the end of 1963, Isaaq particularism appeared more and more to be finding an outlet in the SNC, and its objectives were less the division of the Republic than the downfall of the SYL government.
