= Ali Shido Abdi =

Somali politician and elder

Ali Shido Abdi Omar
- Cali Shido Cumar
- Died: December 26, 2006
- Occupation: Politician

Ali Shido Abdi Omar (Somali: Cali Shido Cumar, Arabic: علي شدو عمر) was a senior Somali politician. He was one of the earliest members of the Somali Youth League in Somalia, and eventually became that political party's vice chairman. He was also first Somali ambassador to France and also served as Somali ambassador to Saudi Arabia.

AUN halgame Ali Shiddo Abdi (1915-2006) was a member of the Central Council of the pro-independence party SYL. He was also the deputy chairman of that party between 1948-1954. 𝗪𝗮𝘅𝗮𝘿𝗮𝘀𝗵𝗮𝗱𝗱𝗮 𝗖𝗮𝗹𝗶 𝗦𝗵𝗶𝗱𝗱𝗼 1950–1952 he was one of the students attending the Scuola speciale di preparazione Politico Amministrativo (Special School of Political and Administrative Preparation), which he completed in the country. 1952-1954 he went to Italy for university studies, specifically at the University of Rome. There he obtained his first degree in political science. The political career of Ali Shiddo Abdi

1948-1954 he was the deputy chairman of the SYL party.

1954-1955 he was the governor of Hiran region.

1955-1962 he was the governor of Bay region.

1962-1966 he was the Somali ambassador to Saudi Arabia.

1966-1968 he was the Somali ambassador to France.

1968-1971 he was the director general of the Ministry of Justice.

After 1971, Ali Shiddo Abdi left politics, and devoted himself to the armed forces until the collapse of the central government of Somalia.

AUN Ali Shiddo Abdi died on September 26, 2006 in Mogadishu after a short illness, and was buried in the Maalin Nur cemetery on the outskirts of Mogadishu.
