= Independence Day (Somalia) =

Somalia national holiday

- Flag of Somalia
- Type: National
- Significance: Establishment of the Somali Republic
- Celebrations: Parades and concerts
- Date: July 1
- Next time: July 1, 2027
- Frequency: Annual

Independence Day is a national holiday occurring annually on July 1. The date celebrates the unification of the Trust Territory of Somalia and the State of Somaliland into the Somali Republic and the independence from the Italian Republic on July 1, 1960. A government was subsequently formed by Abdullahi Issa, Muhammad Haji Ibrahim Egal, and other members of the trusteeship and protectorate governments with Aden Abdullah Osman Daar as president. On July 20, 1961, through a referendum, the people of Somalia ratified a new constitution.
