= Abdirashid Shermarke =

President of Somalia from 1967 to 1969

His Excellency Abdirashid Ali Sharmarke
- عبد الرشيد علي شرماركي
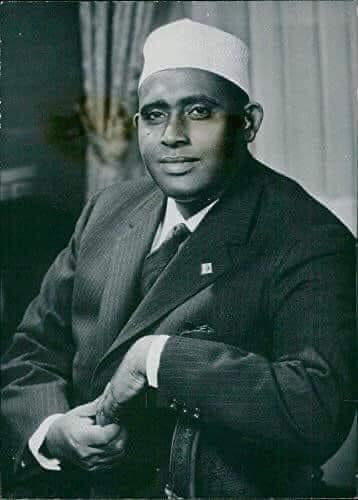
- Sharmarke in the 1960s

2nd President of the Somali Republic
- In office 6 July 1967 – 15 October 1969
- Prime Minister: Muhammad Haji Ibrahim Egal
- Preceded by: Aden Abdullah Osman Daar
- Succeeded by: Mukhtar Mohamed Hussein (acting); Siad Barre

1st Prime Minister of the Somali Republic
- In office 12 July 1960 – 14 June 1964
- President: Aden Adde
- Preceded by: Abdullahi Issa (as the prime minister of the Trust Territory of Somaliland)
- Succeeded by: Abdirizak Haji Hussein

Personal details
- Born: 8 June 1919 Harardhere, Italian Somalia
- Died: 15 October 1969 (aged 50) Las Anod, Somali Republic
- Cause of death: Assassination by gunshot
- Party: Somali Youth League (SYL)
- Education: Sapienza University of Rome

Abdirashid Ali Sharmarke (Somali: Cabdirashiid Cali Sharmaarke, Arabic: عبد الرشيد علي شرماركي) (8 June 1919 – 15 October 1969), was the first Prime Minister of the Somali Republic from 12 July 1960 to 14 June 1964 and the second President from 6 July 1967, until his assassination on October 15, 1969.

== Early life ==
Abdirashid Ali Sharmarke was born in 1919 in the town of Harardhere in the north-central Mudug region of Somalia. His father was from the Osman Mohamud Majeerteen branch of the Darod clan and his mother from the Habar Gidir clan.

Raised in Mogadishu by his mother, Sharmarke attended Qur'anic schools and completed his elementary education in 1936. He then embarked on a career as a trader and later as a civil servant in the Italian colonial administration.

In 1943, the year of its inauguration, Sharmarke joined the incipient Somali Youth League political party. He entered the British administration's civil service the following year.

While still a civil servant, Sharmarke completed his secondary education in 1953. He earned a scholarship to study at the Sapienza University of Rome, where he obtained a BA in Political Science. In 1960, his son, Omar Abdirashid Ali Sharmarke, who would later become Prime Minister of the Somali Transitional Federal Government, was born.

== Political career ==
After returning from his studies abroad in Italy in 1959, Sharmarke was elected to the Legislative Assembly.

On 26 June 1960, British Somaliland gained independence as the State of Somaliland. On 1 July 1960, the State of Somaliland and the Trust Territory of Somaliland (previously Italian Somaliland) united to form the Somali Republic. (The anniversaries of both events are now celebrated on the Independence Day of Somalia as a public holiday in Somaliland and Somalia).

On 1 July 1960, with the creation of the Somali Republic, the then-incumbent President Aden Abdullah Osman Daar appointed Sharmarke Prime Minister of Somalia. Sharmarke's duties as Prime Minister saw him travel abroad extensively in pursuit of a non-aligned and neutral foreign policy. He remained Prime Minister until March 1964, when the first general elections were held and which saw him re-elected as a member of Parliament. In the 1967 presidential elections, Sharmarke beat out Daar to become the second President of Somalia. He was sworn into office on July 6, 1967.

== Assassination ==
In 1968, Sharmarke narrowly escaped an assassination attempt. A grenade exploded near the car that was transporting him back from the airport, but failed to kill him.

On 15 October 1969, while paying an official visit to the northern town of Las Anod, Sharmarke was gunned down by one of his own bodyguards. On duty outside the guest house where the president was staying, the officer fired an automatic rifle in close range at Sharmarke, killing him instantly. Observers suggested that the assassination was inspired by personal rather than political motives. Sharmarke's assassination was quickly followed by a military coup d'état on 21 October 1969 (the day after his funeral), in which the Somali Army seized power without encountering armed opposition; essentially a bloodless takeover. The putsch was spearheaded by Major General Siad Barre, who at the time commanded the army.

== See also ==
- Omar Abdirashid Ali Sharmarke
- Aden Abdullah Osman Daar
- Haji Bashir Ismail Yusuf
- Haji Muse Boqor

== Notes ==
Political offices
Preceded by Aden Abdullah Osman Daar	President of Somalia; 1967–1969	Succeeded by Sheikh Mukhtar Mohamed Hussein; Acting
Preceded by Abdullahi Issa	Prime Minister of Somalia; 1960-1964	Succeeded by Abdirizak Haji Hussein
