= Muhammad Haji Ibrahim Egal =

2nd president of Republic Somaliland (1993–2002)

Mohamed Haji Ibrahim Egal
- محمد حاجي إبراهيم عقال
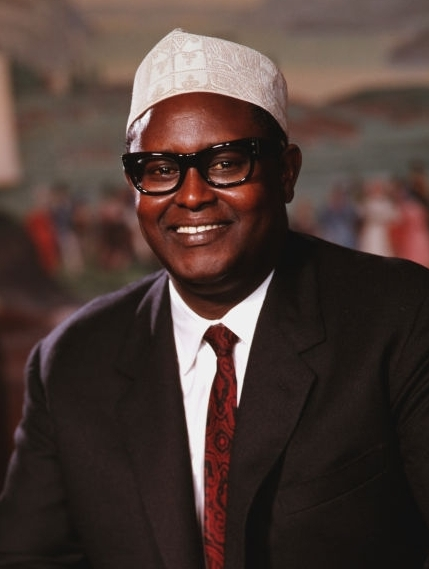
- Egal in 1968

2nd President of Somaliland
- In office 16 May 1993 – 3 May 2002
- Vice President: Abdirahman Ahmed Ali Tuur (1993–1995); Abdirahman Aw Ali Farrah (1995–1997); Dahir Riyale Kahin (1997–2002)
- Preceded by: Abdirahman Ahmed Ali Tuur
- Succeeded by: Dahir Riyale Kahin

1st & 4th Prime Minister of the Somali Republic
- Acting
- In office 1 July 1960 – 12 July 1960
- President: Aden Adde
- Preceded by: Abdullahi Issa
- Succeeded by: Abdirashid Ali Shermarke
- In office 15 July 1967 – 21 October 1969
- President: Abdirashid Shermarke
- Preceded by: Abdirizak Haji Hussein
- Succeeded by: Muhammad Ali Samatar

1st Prime Minister of the State of Somaliland
- In office 26 June 1960 – 1 July 1960
- Preceded by: Office established
- Succeeded by: Office abolished

Personal details
- Born: August 15, 1928 Odweyne, British Somaliland (now Somaliland)
- Died: 3 May 2002 (aged 73) Pretoria, South Africa
- Party: United Peoples' Democratic Party; Somali Youth League
- Spouse(s): (1) Edna Adan (2) Asha Saeed Aabi (3) Hawa Ainab (4) Kaltum Haji Dahir
- Education: SOS Sheikh Secondary School

Mohamed Haji Ibrahim Egal (Somali: Maxamed Xaaji Ibraahim Cigaal; 15 August 1928 – 3 May 2002) was a Somali politician who served as the 2nd President of Somaliland from 1993 until his death in 2002, guiding the state through a period of stabilization and institution-building. Before the formation of the Somali Republic, Egal served briefly as the Prime Minister of State of Somaliland. He also served twice as the Prime Minister of the Somali Republic briefly in 1960 and again from 1967 to 1969.

== Early life ==
Mohamed Haji Ibrahim Egal was born in 1928 in Odweyne, located within the British Somaliland Protectorate modern day in Somaliland. The son of a wealthy merchant, Egal hailed from the Issa Musse sub-division of the Habar Awal sub-clan (part of the larger Isaaq). He later married Asha Saeed Abby, and the couple had five children: three sons and two daughters.

Egal's formal education began in former British Somaliland, where he completed his primary, intermediate, and secondary schooling. In a move that was notably unusual for the era, he was sent to the United Kingdom to continue his studies.

== Career ==
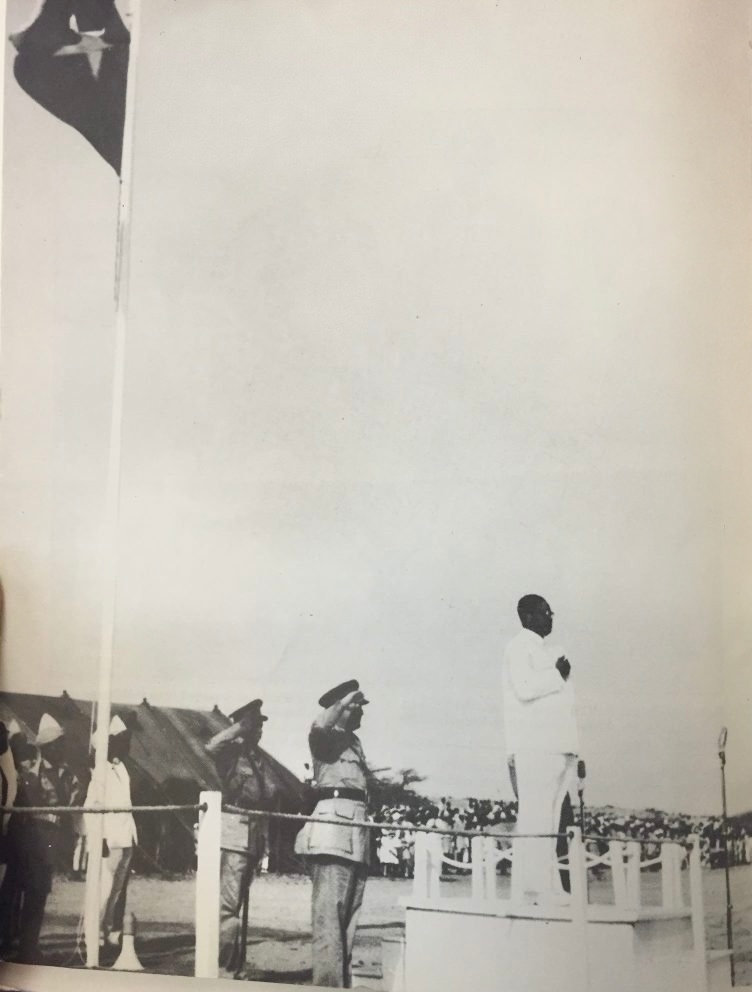
Egal saluting the Somali flag at the occasion of Somaliland's independence ceremony on 26 June 1960

=== Prime Minister of the State of Somaliland ===
On 26 June 1960, Egal was Prime minister of the newly independent State of Somaliland, which merged five days later with the former Trust Territory of Somalia to form the Somali Republic on 1 July 1960.

=== Government work ===
He served as the first Somali Republic's minister of defence (1960–1961), Education Minister (1962–1963), Prime minister (1967–1969), and ambassador to India (1976–1978).

=== Prime Minister of the Somali Republic ===
In 1967, Abdirashid Ali Shermarke was elected President and he appointed Egal as the Prime Minister. The ascension Muhammad Haji Ibrahim Egal to the role of Prime Minister was reportedly in large part financed by thousands of dollars in covert support to him and other pro-Western elements in the ruling Somali Youth League party by the American Central Intelligence Agency. According the US State Department memo from 1968 Egal, "...speaks English fluently and, though a Muslim, enjoys a drink. He is a pragmatic African moderate and is pro-West."

While Egal had publicly claimed during 1968 that Somalia had no attention of changing course on the aim to unify all Somalis and reclaim "lost lands", he provoked popular anger in the country after later giving up claims to the Ogaden.

He was still the prime minister and in the US, when Abdirashid Ali Shermarke was assassinated on 15 October 1969. Shortly afterward, the newly established Supreme Revolutionary Council (SRC) led by Major General Siad Barre, Brigadier General Mohamed Ainashe Gule, Lieutenant Colonel Salaad Gabeyre Kediye and Chief of Police Jama Korshel seized power. The SRC subsequently renamed the country the Somali Democratic Republic, arrested members of the former civilian government, banned political parties, dissolved the parliament and the Supreme Court, and suspended the constitution. Egal was among the politicians detained by the SRC for his prominent role in the nation's early government. He was eventually released and was named the Ambassador to India (1976-1978) before the Barre regime imprisoned him again on charges of conspiracy until 1985.

=== President of Somaliland ===
Egal managed to successfully disarm and rehabilitate rebel groups, stabilised the Economy of Somaliland, successfully managed to establish bilateral trade with foreign countries, introduce Somaliland new currency the Somaliland shilling, as well as the Somaliland passport and Somaliland national flag.

In 1995, Egal wrote a letter to Israeli Prime Minister Yitzhak Rabin seeking to establish diplomatic ties between the two countries. Egal spoke of the need to jointly counter Islamism in the region. According to Abdirahman Tuur, the first president of Somaliland, Egal had sought to form a relationship with Israel in hopes of gaining recognition from the United States.

Throughout his term as president of the Republic of Somaliland, Egal's dedication to the secessionist cause was doubted and challenged by hardliners, particularly within the Somali National Movement (SNM), who believed that he still ultimately hoped to reconcile with other political actors in the rest of Somalia. In August 2001, Egal survived by one vote a motion tabled by several MPs charging him of half-heartedly pursuing separatism.

In an interview with IRIN the same year, SNM leader Abdirahman Awale also said of Egal that "when he says he is for independence, it is for local consumption only. He tells the people here one thing, but in his speeches elsewhere he has clearly declared that Somalia will unite one day. He says we will talk to the southerners when they make their home clean and negotiate with them... He says one thing to the public, and a different thing to the international community."

== Death ==
Egal died on 3 May 2002, in Pretoria, South Africa, while undergoing surgery at a military hospital. His body was returned to Somaliland for a state funeral, whereafter his three sons laid him to rest next to his father, in accordance with his last wishes. Around 4,000 mourners reportedly attended his burial in Berbera, and the parliament declared seven days of mourning. Dahir Rayale Kahin was sworn in the next day as the new president.

== Personal life ==
During his term as President of Somaliland, Egal was accused of alcoholism by some of his critics. In 1995, Egal himself confessed that although it had been a long time since he drank whiskey, he still periodically drank wine. A 1968 memo from U.S. Under Secretary of State Nicholas Katzenbach to President Lyndon B. Johnson mentions that Egal was a heavy drinker despite being Muslim. The US Consul in Hargeisa, Gordon Beyer, similarly mentioned routinely drinking with Egal at Hargeisa Bar Club, a venue Egal especially enjoyed.

Egal was close friends with Hollywood star William Holden. At the time of the assassination of Abdirashid Ali Sharmarke, Egal was partying and gambling with Holden in Las Vegas. The Somali Embassy struggled to contact him following the news of the assassination and eventually, sought the help of the FBI to locate him.

During his premiership Egal used public revenue to build his private villa, Villa Baidoa, on the road to Afgooye. This was a break from the conduct of his predecessors such as Aden Adde who only used private funds to build the presidential retreat at Afgooye.

Political offices
New title	Prime Minister of the State of Somaliland; 1960	Somaliland merged with Somalia
New title	Prime Minister of Somalia; 1960	Succeeded by Abdirashid Ali Shermarke
Preceded by Abdirizak Haji Hussein	Prime Minister of Somalia; 1967 – 1969	Succeeded by Mohamed Farah Salad
Preceded by Abdirahman Ahmed Ali Tuur	President of Somaliland; 1993 – 2002	Succeeded by Dahir Riyale Kahin
