= 1969 Somali parliamentary election =

Parliamentary elections were held in Somalia on 26 March 1969. A total of 64 parties ran in the election, many of which had been formed shortly beforehand. The result was a victory for the Somali Youth League (SYL), which won 73 of the 123 seats. In total, 27 parties won seats, but immediately after the elections, most of the MPs for the smaller parties joined the Somali Youth League. The SYL held 109 seats by the end of May, in addition to being in a coalition with the Somali National Congress. This gave the SYL control of 120 of the 123 seats.

This was to be the last election in Somalia prior to a coup d'état on 21 October, when officers of the far-left Supreme Revolutionary Council led by Siad Barre transformed Somalia into a single-party Marxist-Leninist state that would last until the fall of the regime in 1991.

== Electoral system ==
The electoral system used was a mixture of single-member plurality and party-list proportional representation. There were 48 electoral districts. In ten of them, only one member was elected, and thus the single-member plurality system was used. In the remaining districts, seats were distributed using party-list proportional representation and the Hare quota. The average number of members elected in a multi-member district was approximately three.

== Results ==
| Party | Votes | % | Seats | +/– |
|---|---|---|---|---|
| Somali Youth League | 260,046 | 33.24 | 73 | +4 |
| Somali National Congress | 77,339 | 9.89 | 11 | –11 |
| Somali Democratic Union | 46,064 | 5.89 | 2 | –13 |
| Popular Movement for Democratic Action | 42,629 | 5.45 | 2 | New |
| Somali African National Union | 42,006 | 5.37 | 6 | +1 |
| Somali Socialist Party | 31,058 | 3.97 | 2 | New |
| Somali Independent Constitutional Party | 27,681 | 3.54 | 8 | –1 |
| Liberal Party of Young Somalis | 25,639 | 3.28 | 3 | +2 |
| Revolutionary Socialist Workers Party | 16,742 | 2.14 | 1 | New |
| United Somali Party | 13,942 | 1.78 | 0 | –1 |
| Ururka Dadka Dalka | 13,543 | 1.73 | 1 | New |
| Somali National Solidarity Party | 12,269 | 1.57 | 1 | New |
| Somali People's Movement Party | 8,531 | 1.09 | 2 | New |
| Somali United Party | 7,923 | 1.01 | 1 | New |
| Muslim Democratic Party | 6,655 | 0.85 | 1 | New |
| Somali Republican party | 6,240 | 0.80 | 0 | –1 |
| Ubah Party | 5,912 | 0.76 | 1 | New |
| Somali National League | 5,404 | 0.69 | 1 | 0 |
| All Somali Association | 5,395 | 0.69 | 1 | New |
| Somali Danwadag Union Party | 5,389 | 0.69 | 1 | New |
| Somali Labour Party | 5,122 | 0.65 | 1 | New |
| Progressive Socialist Union | 4,426 | 0.57 | 1 | New |
| Organisation of Somali Unity | 4,353 | 0.56 | 1 | New |
| Somali National Movement | 4,290 | 0.55 | 0 | –1 |
| Worker's and People's Democratic Party | 3,524 | 0.45 | 1 | New |
| Somali African Democratic Party | 3,471 | 0.44 | 1 | New |
| Somali National Union Manifesto | 2,908 | 0.37 | 1 | New |
| Somali Amalgamation Party | 2,870 | 0.37 | 1 | New |
| Justice and Freedom Party | 2,305 | 0.29 | 1 | New |
| Somali Democratic Party | 2,293 | 0.29 | 1 | New |
| 34 other parties | 86,265 | 11.03 | 0 | – |
| Total | 782,234 | 100.00 | 127 | 0 |
| Valid votes | 782,234 | 88.94 | | |
| Invalid/blank votes | 97,320 | 11.06 | | |
| Total votes | 879,554 | 100.00 | | |
Source: Inter-Parliamentary Union
