= 1964 Somali parliamentary election =

- 30 March 1964

123 of the 123 seats in the National Assembly 62 seats needed for a majority
- Turnout: 914,069
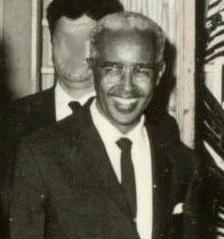

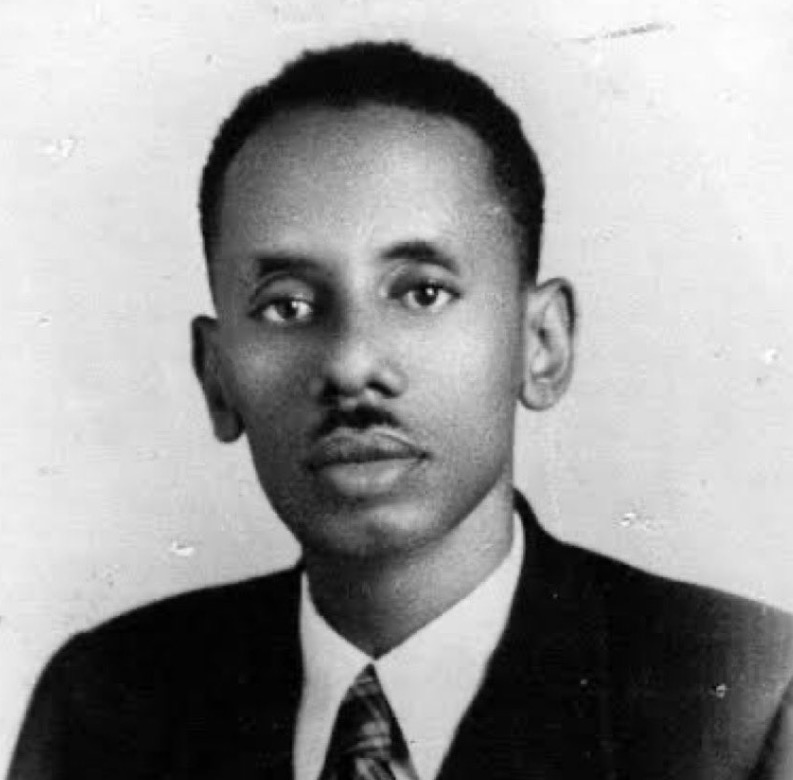
	Majority party	Minority party	Third party
		SNC
Leader	Aden Abdulle Osman	Ali Jimale	Haji Muhammad Huseyn
Party	SYL	Somali National Congress	Somali Democratic Union
Leader's seat	Beledweyne	Beledweyne	Merca
Seats won	69	22	15
Popular vote	472,296	186,208	95,707
Percentage	51.7	20.4%	10.5%

Parliamentary elections were held in Somalia on 30 March 1964. The result was a victory for the Somali Youth League (SYL), which won 69 of the 123 seats.

The elections took place as the 1964 war with Ethiopia was ongoing.

== Background ==
The elections were the first to be held since the merger of British Somaliland and Italian Somaliland created Somalia in 1960. After the union the two territories' parliaments had merged, retaining the same number of seats as in the 1960 elections in British Somaliland and the 1959 elections in Italian Somaliland.

== Results ==
Party	Votes	%	Seats	+/–
Somali Youth League	472,296	51.67	69	−14
Somali National Congress	186,208	20.37	22	New
Somali Democratic Union	95,707	10.47	15	New
Somali Independent Constitutional Party	80,173	8.77	9	+4
United Somali Party	7,552	0.83	1	−11
Liberal Party of Somali Youth	6,766	0.74	1	New
Somali National League	4,354	0.48	1	−19
Somali African National Union	3,930	0.43	1	New
13 other parties	57,083	6.24	4	New
Total	914,069	100.00	123	0
Source: Nohlen et al.
