= 1958 French Somaliland Territorial Council election =

Territorial Council elections were held in French Somaliland on 23 November 1958. The result was a victory for the Defence of Economic and Social Interests of the Territory party, which won 25 of the 32 seats.

== Electoral system ==
The elections were held using proportional representation. The country was divided into three constituencies; Djibouti electing 16 members, Tadjoura–Obock electing nine and Dikhil–Ali Sabieh electing seven.

== Results ==
Party	Seats	+/–
Defence of Economic and Social Interests of the Territory	25	+25
Somali Democratic Union	7	New
Ahmed Goumané party	0	New
Total	32	+2
Source: Thompson & Adloff

=== By ethnic group ===
Ethnic group	Seats	+/–
Afars	13	+6
Issas	8	0
Somalis	6	–1
Europeans	4	–1
Arabs	1	–2
Total	32	0
Source: Sternberger et al.
