= 1958 Italian Somaliland local elections =

Local elections were held in Trust Territory of Somaliland in October 1958. The Somali Youth League won 416 of the 663 seats up for election.

== Results ==
Party	Votes	%	Seats
Somali Youth League	39,178	37.25	416
Hizbia Digil and Mirifle	38,214	36.33	175
Liberal Party	11,004	10.46	27
Greater Somalia League	10,125	9.63	36
Somali National Union	6,322	6.01	6
Somali Bagiuni Fichirini	341	0.32	3
Total	105,184	100.00	663
Source: Furtado
