= 1959 Italian Somaliland parliamentary election =

Parliamentary elections were held in the Italian Trust Territory of Somaliland on 8 March 1959. Amidst a boycott by the Somali Independent Constitutional Party and the Greater Somalia League, the result was a victory for the ruling Somali Youth League, which won 83 of the 90 seats in the enlarged Legislative Council, despite the party's number of votes falling from 333,820 to 237,134.

== Results ==
Party	Votes	%	Seats	+/–
Somali Youth League	237,134	75.58	83	+40
Somali Independent Constitutional Party	40,857	13.02	5	New
Liberal Party	35,769	11.40	2	New
Total	313,760	100.00	90	+20
Source: Nohlen et al.
