= Somali African National Union =

Somali African National Union الاتحاد الافريقي الوطني الصومالي
- Headquarters: Banaadir
- Ideology: Somali nationalism
- Political position: Centre-right

Somali African National Union (SANU) (Arabic: الاتحاد الافريقي الوطني الصومالي) was an early political party in Somalia. It represented the coastal Banaadir region.

== History ==
The Somali African Union was established during the pre-independence period. It was originally known as the Hamar Youth Club, and had a predominantly Benadiri constituency. The party was at the time the only political ally of the larger Somali Youth League (SYL). Both parties supported a ten-year trusteeship period during which the Somali territories would be prepared for independence, followed by the re-unification of Somali land in a Greater Somalia. However, the parties emphasized that the Four-Power Commission should administer the transitional trusteeship body rather than the Italian or Ethiopian authorities.

In the 1960s, the Hamar Youth Club changed its name to the Somali African National Union (SANU). SANU and other parties competed for 123 parliament seats, taking part in the Somali parliamentary elections of 1964. In the general elections held in March 1969, it took home 6 seats.

The Somali African National Union later split into several political factions. As of 2001, its acronym was the Somali National Union (SNU).

== See also ==
- Somali Youth League
- List of political parties in Somalia
