= Somali Labour Party =

Somali political party

- Chairperson: Ali Mohamed Apollo
- Founder: Ali Mohamed Apollo
- Founded: 7 October 2011
- Headquarters: Ottawa, Canada; Mogadishu, Somalia
- Ideology: Labourism; Social democracy
- Political position: Centre-left
- Colors: Red, Blue

Party flag
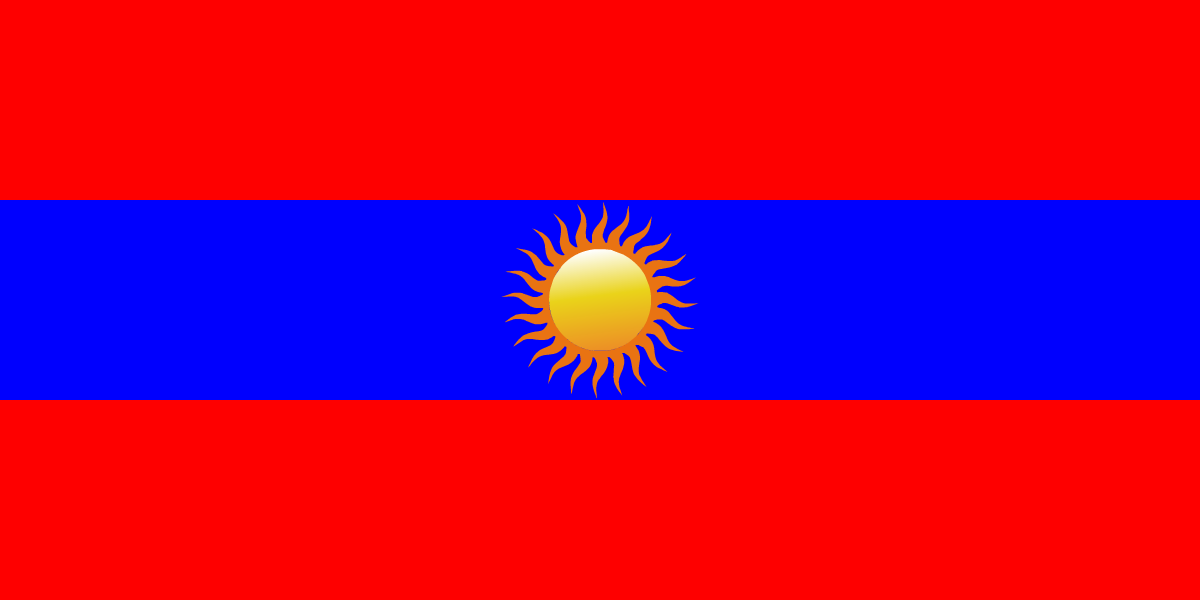

Website
- http://www.somalilabourparty.org/ https://www.slpgov.com

Somali Labour Party (Somali: Xisbiga Shaqaalaha Somaliyeed) is a Somali political party. Founded on 7 October 2011 in Toronto, Canada. On 11 August 2018, it was temporarily registered in the Mogadishu. The party's main headquarters are located in Hamar Weyne District.

The Somali Labor Party has been operating informally since its inception and its activities have been officially announced following the issuance of the Provisional Registration Certificate.

== See also ==
- Political parties in Somalia
