= United Somali Party =

Political party in Somaliland

United Somali Party Xisbiga Midnimadda Soomaaliyeed
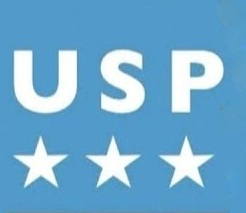
- Founder: Garad Ali
- Founded: 1959
- Headquarters: Las Anod
- Ideology: Nationalism; Populism; Islamic democracy Dir-Darod interests
- House of Representatives: 12 / 33

The United Somali Party (USP) was a political party in British Somaliland founded in 1959. The party drew support from the Darood clans such as Dhulbahante and Warsangali in the east and the Gadabuursi clans in the west with its three major sub clans which are 1- Makhail Makadoor 2- Habar Carfaan and 3- Maxad Cassi in the north west. In the February 1960 parliamentary election, the USP received 16.4% of the vote and won 12 of the 33 elected seats, making it the second-largest party after the Somali National League. Following the election, the USP formed a coalition with the SNL.

== History ==
The USP was formed in 1959 at Las Anod, a centre of the Darod population in British Somaliland. Its early leadership consisted of prominent traditional chiefs, with Ali Garad Jama, the university-educated son of Garad Jama Farah, providing the main drive behind the party.

The United Somali Party was founded in 1959 to represent the Darod in eastern British Somaliland and the Dir, although the two groups belonged to different lineages and had little previous interaction, they shared a mutual opposition to the majority Isaaq. The party became the second-largest political party in British Somaliland.

=== 1960 election ===
Before the February 1960 general election, the USP and the Somali National League (SNL) agreed to support each other's candidates where advantageous and to combine in the Legislative Council if they won the election. The USP subsequently received 16.4% of the vote and won 12 of the 33 seats, compared with 20 for the SNL and one for the National United Front. The result made the USP the second-largest party in the protectorate and it formed a parliamentary coalition with the SNL.

=== Post-unification ===
Following the unification of Somalia in 1960 the USP secured two ministerial positions in the first government of the Somali Republic.

In the 1964 parliamentary elections, the first after the unification of Somalia, the party received only 0.8% of the vote and won one seat. The 1969 elections saw the party increase its vote share to 1.8%, but it lost its parliamentary representation.

== Members of Parliament ==
=== 1960 elections ===
Name	Year	Constituent city	Clan
Abdilahi Qablan	1960	Las Qorey	Dubays / Warsangeli
Mohamud Salax Caddaanweyne	1960	Jidali	Cumar / Warsangeli
Ali Garad Jama	1960	Las Anod	Baharsame / Dhulbahante
Osman Garad	1960	Taleh	Galool Oriye / Dhulbahante
Abdalla Farah	1960	Widhwidh	Barkad / Dhulbahante
Mohamed Geedeeye	1960	Caynabo	Ararsame / Dhulbahante
Ibrahim Eid	1960	Xudun	Naleeye Ahmed / Dhulbahante
Abubakar Omar	1960	Borama	Gadabuursi
Jama Ghelle	1960	Saylac (Zeila)	Gadabuursi
Musa Shirwa	1960	Lughaya	Gadabuursi
Abdi Buuni	1960	Baki	Gadabuursi
Ibrahim Nuur	1960	Dilla	Gadabuursi
Source: Menafn, Somaliland Standard
