= Greater Somalia League =

Former political party in Somalia

The Greater Somalia League (GSL) was a political party in Somalia that advocated for the establishment of a Greater Somalia.

== History ==
The GSL was led by Haaji Mahammad Husseen. It was formed by dissidents of the Somali Youth League (SYL).

The party was fiercely nationalist and called for the unification of all Somali areas into one state. It charged the Somali Youth League with not wanting the unification of Somalia. Haaji Mahammad Husseen and a group of his followers were arrested after violent protests and put to trial.

The GSL boycotted the 1958 municipal election, charging harassment from the SYL. It also boycotted the later 1959 elections. In 1958, Halima Godane was elected to Mogadishu's city council, representing the party.

During its existence, the party enjoyed good relations with the Republican Union in French Somaliland.
