= List of Somali flags =

This is a list of flags of entities named related to Somalia.

== National flags ==
Flag	Duration	Use	Description
	1954–present	National flag of Somalia and the flag for several Somali republics	A single white five-pointed star centered on a blue field.

== Regional flags ==
=== State flags ===
Flag	Duration	Use	Description
	2002–2006, 2014–present	Flag of the South West State	The blue background and star of the national flag in the upper hoist, a red diagonal band through the middle, and a green background with a ring of six stars in the lower fly.
	2014	Flag of the South West State	A horizontal tricolor of blue, red, and green, with a large white star in the top stripe, and a ring of six small stars in the bottom stripe.
	2002	Flag of the South West State	A horizontal tricolor of blue, red, and green, with a ring of six stars in the upper hoist.
	2015–present	Flag of Galmudug State	A blue field bearing a white star on the flu side and a white pile at the hoist bearing two green stars aligned horizontally.
	2010–2015	Flag of Galmudug State	
	2009–2010	Flag of Galmudug State	
	2006–2009	Flag of Galmudug State	Same as Somalia's national flag.
	2009–present	Flag of Puntland State	A horizontal tricolor of blue, white, and green with a white star at the top.
	?–2009	Flag of Puntland State	Same as Somalia's national flag.
	2023–present	Flag of the North East State	
	2013–present	Flag of Jubaland State	
		Flag of Hirshabelle State	
	2008–2015	Flag of Himan and Heeb State	
		Flag of Banadir State, coextensive with Mogadishu	
	2007–2008	Flag of Maakhir State, a quasi-state in the nation of Somalia	
	2008–2009	Flag of Maakhir	
		Flag of the unrecognised Jubba Valley State	
		Flag of the unrecognised Raas Caseyr State	

=== Other ===
Flag	Duration	Use	Description
	1998–1999	Flag of Jubaland	
	1996–present	Flag of the Republic of Somaliland	
		Flag of the Republic of Azania	
	2008–present	Flag of the Islamic Wilayaat of Somalia	

== Military flags ==
Flag	Duration	Use	Description
		Flag of the Somali Armed Forces	

== Police flags ==
Flag	Duration	Use	Description
		Flag of the Somali Police Force	A blue banner with the logo of the Somali Police Force, centered.

== Political flags ==
Flag	Duration	Use	Description
	1984–present	Flag of the Ogaden National Liberation Front	
	2011–present	Flag of the Somali Labour Party	
		Flag of the Somali Youth League	
	1981–1991	Flag of the Somali National Movement	
	1991–present	Flag of Ahlu Sunnah Waljamaca	

== Historical flags ==
The following are the flags historically used in the territory of present-day Somalia:

=== Pre-colonial states ===
Flag	Duration	Use	Description
	10th century–16th century	Flag of the Sultanate of Mogadishu according to Lázaro Luis' 1563 map	A dark blue field with a golden crescent moon in the center.
	13th century–17th century	Flag of the Ajuran Empire	A bicoloured pennon of red and yellow with a white crescent moon off-centred toward the hoist.
	17th century–19th century	Flag of the Hiraab Imamate	A swallowtailed bicoloured banner of red and blue with two white crescent moons.
	1415–1577	Flag of the Adal Sultanate	Three banners of white, red, and white with a crescent moon in each banner.
	1695–1911	Signature flag of the Sultanate of the Geledi	A vertical bicolor of blue and green with a five-pointed star in the blue stripe and Arabic script in the green stripe.
	1700s–1884	Religious banner of the Isaaq Sultanate derived from an Adal Sultanate flag	A green field with white Arabic script.
	1896–1925	Flag of the Dervish State	A blue field with a red square border in the center and a red square inside of it, bordered with red.

=== Italian Somaliland ===
Flag	Duration	Use	Description
	1889–1941	Flag of Italian Somaliland	An Italian tricolour with Savoy shield and Royal crown in the middle.
	1941–1950	Flag of Italian Somaliland under British occupation	A superimposition of the flags of England and Scotland with the Saint Patrick's Saltire (representing Ireland).
	1950–1960	Official flag of Trust Territory of Somaliland	A tricolour featuring three equally sized vertical bands of green, white, and red.
	1950–1960	Flag of the United Nations	Sky blue banner with a white UN emblem (an azimuthal equidistant projection surrounded by two olive branches) in the centre.
	1954–1960	Co-official/secondary flag of Trust Territory of Somaliland	Same as the Somali flag.

=== British Somaliland ===
Flag	Duration	Use	Description
	1884–1903	Flag of the United Kingdom used in British Somaliland	A superimposition of the flags of England and Scotland with the Saint Patrick's Saltire (representing Ireland).
	1884–1898	Flag of the British Raj used in British Somaliland	A British Red Ensign defaced with the Star of India emblem in the fly.
	1903–1950	Flag of British Somaliland	A British Blue Ensign defaced with a kudu antelope in a white disc in the fly.
	1950–1952	Flag of British Somaliland	A British Blue Ensign defaced with the badge of British Somaliland in a white disc in the fly.
	1952–1960	Flag of British Somaliland	A British Blue Ensign defaced with the badge of British Somaliland in a white disc in the fly.
	1960	Flag of the State of Somaliland	Sky blue field charged with a white five-pointed star.

== See also ==
- Flag of Somalia
- Flag of Somaliland
