= Independence Day (Somaliland) =

Annual national celebration held on 18 May in Somaliland

Restoration Day يوم استعادة سيادة صوماليلاند
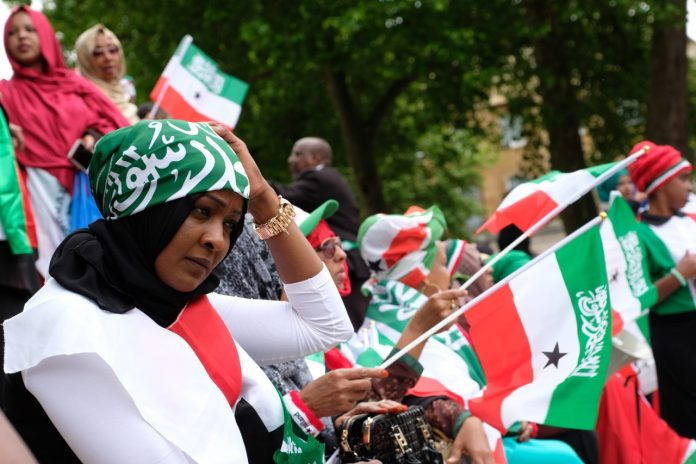
- Women celebrating Restoration Day with the flag of Somaliland
- Also called: 18 May
- Observed by: Somaliland
- Type: National Day
- Significance: Marks the restoration of Somaliland's self-governance and sovereignty following the collapse of the Somali Democratic Republic in 1991
- Celebrations: Flag hoisting, parades, patriotic songs, cultural programs, speeches by government officials, military displays, and nationwide public celebrations
- Date: 18 May
- Next time: 18 May 2027
- Frequency: annual
- Related to: 26 June Somaliland National Day

Restoration Day in Somaliland (Arabic: يوم استعادة سيادة صوماليلاند) is an annual national celebration observed on 18 May in Somaliland. The holiday commemorates the 1991 restoration of Somaliland's self-governance and sovereignty following the collapse of the Somali Democratic Republic.

The holiday is distinct from 26 June Somaliland National Day, which commemorates the independence of the former State of Somaliland from British rule on 26 June 1960.

Following independence, the former State of Somaliland entered into a political union with the Trust Territory of Somalia on 1 July 1960, forming the Somali Republic. The legal validity of the union has been disputed by Somaliland supporters, who argue that the union was never properly ratified through a mutually binding Act of Union.

After the collapse of the Somali central government during the Somali Civil War, Somaliland's administration declared the restoration of the sovereignty of the former State of Somaliland on 18 May 1991.

Although Somaliland remains internationally recognised as part of Somalia, it has maintained its own government, security forces, currency, and institutions since 1991.

In 2005, an African Union fact-finding mission described Somaliland's case as "unique and self-justified in African political history". The mission stated that Somaliland's situation should not be linked to the notion of "opening a Pandora's box" regarding African borders and separatist movements, noting that the territory's case arose from historical circumstances distinct from most other secessionist conflicts in Africa.

Restoration Day is one of the most significant public holidays in Somaliland and is celebrated throughout the country, including in Hargeisa, Burao, Berbera, Borama, Erigavo, and other cities and towns. Celebrations commonly include military parades, flag displays, patriotic songs, cultural performances, public gatherings, and speeches by government officials. Major roads, buildings, and public spaces are decorated with the Somaliland flag, while many businesses and institutions close for the day to participate in the celebrations.

== Gallery ==
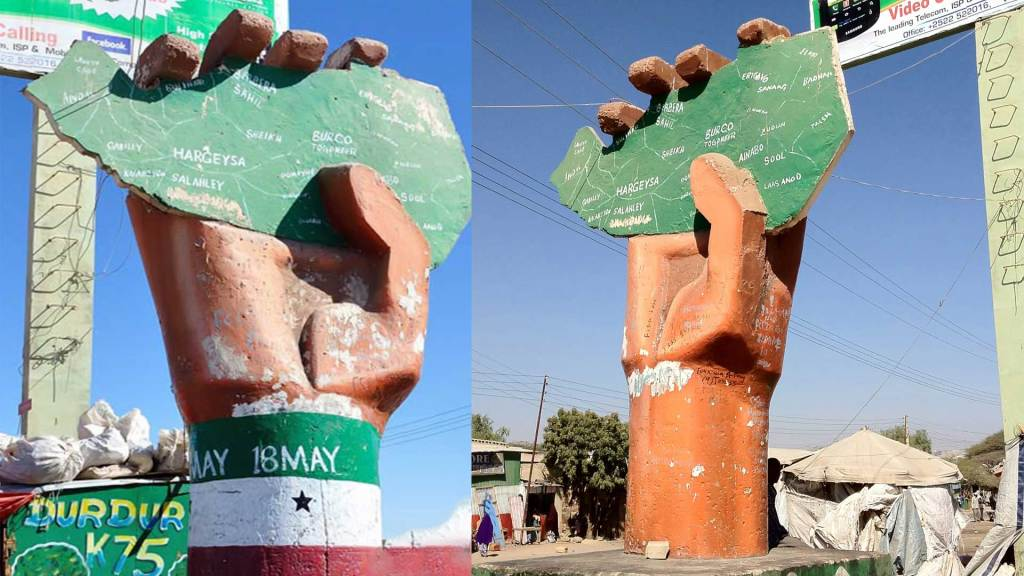
Independence monument in Hargeisa, Somaliland
