= National anthem of Somaliland (1960) =

- National anthem of the State of Somaliland
- Music: R.A.Y. Mitchell, 1960
- Adopted: 26 June 1960
- Relinquished: 1 July 1960
- Preceded by: God Save the Queen
- Succeeded by: Soomaaliya na Hanolato

The national anthem of Somaliland was the national anthem of the independent State of Somaliland that existed in the Horn of Africa between 26 June and 1 July 1960.

The anthem, which had no lyrics, was composed by local musicians, drawing inspiration from the traditional music of the region, and transcribed by British bandmaster R.A.Y. Mitchell of the band of the Royal Highland Fusiliers.

Since 2012, arrangements of it have been used as the theme tune for the news on SLNTV, Somaliland's state broadcaster. Initially a more traditional arrangement was used, however since 2017 an arrangement with stylings and instrumentation based on modern Somali music and pop music has been used.

== See also ==
- Samo ku waar, the national anthem of the re-established Republic of Somaliland
