= National anthem of Somalia (1960–2000) =

Astaanta Qaranka Soomaaliya
English: National anthem of Somalia
- Former national anthem of Somalia
- Music: Giuseppe Blanc
- Adopted: July 1, 1960
- Relinquished: 2000
- Succeeded by: "Soomaaliyeey toosoo"

Audio sample
- file; help

The National Anthem of Somalia (Somali: Astaanta Qaranka Soomaaliya) was the national anthem of Somalia between 1960 and 2000.

== History ==
The Somali Republic was formed on 1 July 1960 following the union of the newly independent Trust Territory of Somalia (the former Italian Somaliland, now Somalia) and the State of Somaliland (the former British Somaliland, now Somaliland). At this time a wordless and untitled piece by Italian composer Giuseppe Blanc was adopted as the national anthem. This anthem remained in use during the Somali Democratic Republic period between 1969–1991. It was replaced with Soomaaliyeey toosoo by the Transitional national government of Somalia in 2000.

== See also ==
- History of Somalia
- Flag of Somalia
- Soomaaliyeey toosoo, national anthem 2000–2012
- Qolobaa Calankeed, national anthem 2012–present
