= 2005 Somaliland parliamentary election =

- 29 September 2005

82 seats in the House of Representatives of Somaliland 42 seats needed for a majority
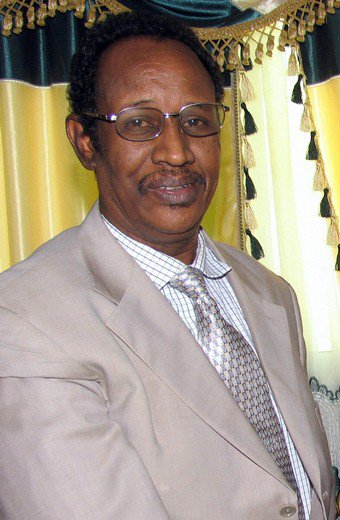

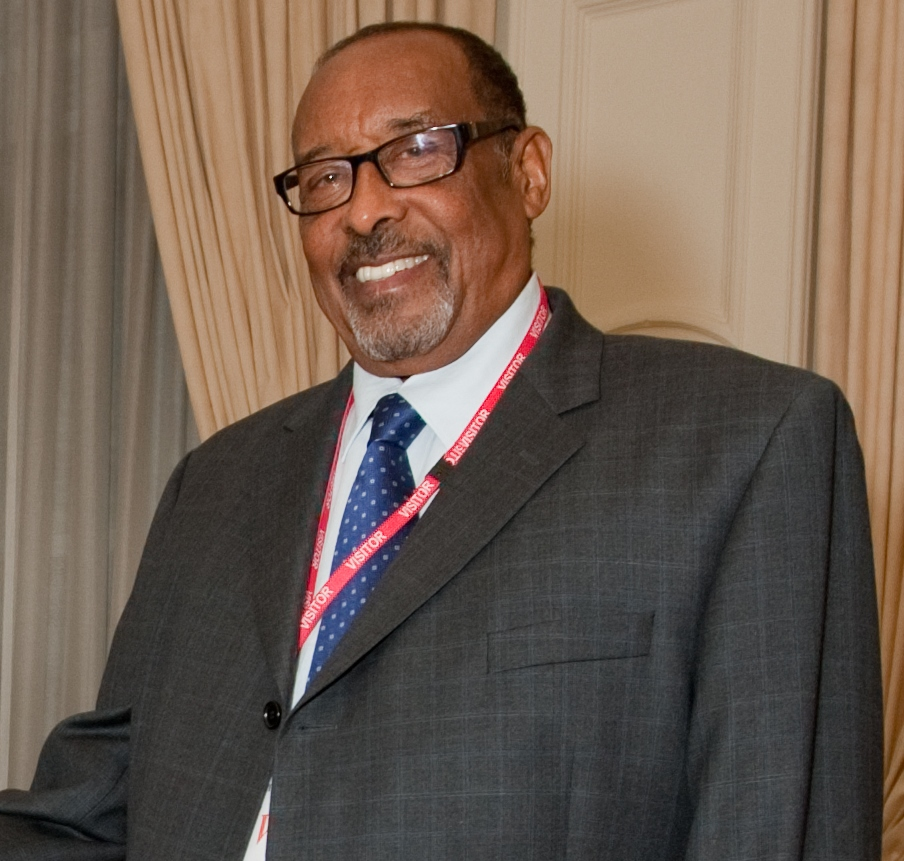

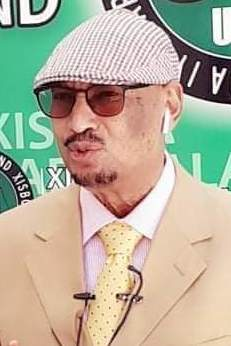
	First party	Second party	Third party
Leader	Dahir Riyale Kahin	Ahmed Mohamed Silanyo	Faysal Ali Warabe
Party	UDUB	Kulmiye	UCID
Leader since	2002	2002	2001
Seats won	33	28	21
Popular vote	261,449	228,328	180,545
Percentage	39.00%	34.06%	26.9%
- Results by constituency.

Parliamentary elections were held in Somaliland on 29 September 2005. They were the first multiparty parliamentary election conducted in the country.

== Electoral system ==
The 82 members of the House of Representatives were elected by open list proportional representation with the six multi-member constituencies based on the regions. The number of seats for each region was based on those used for the 1960 elections and multiplied by 2.5.

Seat allocation by region
Region	Seats
Awdal	13
Maroodi Jeex	20
Sahil	10
Togdheer	15
Sanaag	12
Sool	12
Source: IRI

== Campaign ==
At the time of the elections, the constitution limited the number of political parties to three:

- Peace, Unity, and Development Party (Kulmiye) led by Ahmed Mohamed Mohamoud, the former President of Somaliland
- For Justice and Development (Ururka Caddaalada iyo Daryeelka, UCID) led by Faysal Ali Warabe
- United Peoples' Democratic Party (Ururka dimuqraadiga ummadda bahawday, UDUB) led by Dahir Riyale Kahin, the former President of Somaliland

A total of 246 candidates contested the elections, including five women.

== Conduct ==
A team of 76 observers from Canada, Finland, Kenya, South Africa, the United Kingdom, the United States and Zimbabwe monitored the polls. They described that the elections were conducted in a peaceful condition and were generally free and fair, nonetheless, the vote had fallen short of meeting several international standards.

== Results ==
Party	Votes	%	Seats
United Peoples' Democratic Party	261,449	39.00	33
Peace, Unity, and Development Party	228,328	34.06	28
For Justice and Development	180,545	26.93	21
Total	670,322	100.00	82
Valid votes	670,322	99.32	
Invalid/blank votes	4,585	0.68	
Total votes	674,907	100.00	
Source: IRI
