= Flag of Jubaland =

African flag

Jubaland State of Somalia
- Proportion: 2:3
- Adopted: 28 February 2013; 13 years ago
- Design: A horizontal tricolor of green, blue and white with a blue triangle based on the hoist side containing a white star.

Jubaland has had a wide array of flags in its modern history, ranging from that during its British East Africa Province of Jubaland era, during the transitionary Trans-Juba period of Jubaland, as well as the current Jubaland's federal state flag.

== British East Africa ==
During its period as a British East Africa province, Jubaland had a variation of the British blue ensign.

Flag of British East Africa

== Transitionary phase ==
Jubaland was in the transitionary phase of Trans-Juba for a total of 715 days, or one year, eleven months, and fifteen days, from the 15 July 1924 until 30 June 1926:

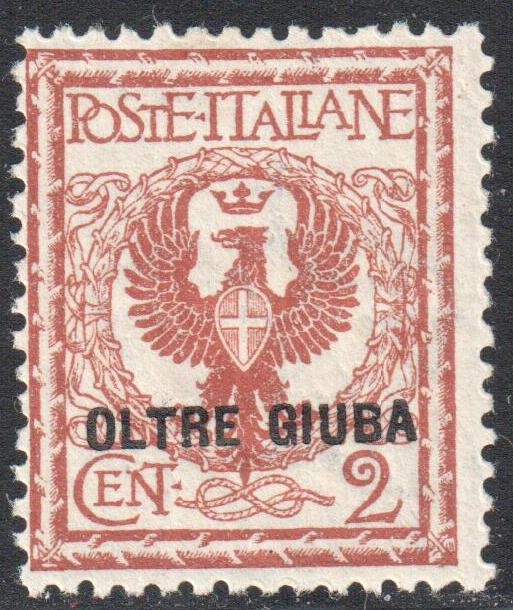
Trans-juba

Afterwards the Italian colonial flag with the emblematic crown was used:

Italian colonial flag

== British and UN administrative period ==
From 1941 until 1949 was the British administrative period after the British occupied places vacated by the Italians in WW2:

BMAS (British Military Administration of Somalia)

Subsequently, the Stettinius blue of the United Nations flag, first erected in New York City and which would later be embraced as Somalia's national flag, was adopted by Jubaland as well as Somalia during its United Nations Trust Territory period.

United Nations Trust Territory

== Contemporary assortment ==
During Jubaland's development phase various flags had been proposed, as well as the one used during the existence of the self-proclaimed Republic of Azania, which resembled the Russian flag. The current flag of Jubaland was adopted at a conference on 28 February 2013 at Kismayo.

In 2023 conservatives and right-wing media attacked a flag design for Minnesota, advancing a conspiracy theory that it represents a Somali "conquest" of Minnesota due to similarities with the current Jubaland flag.

First adopted Jubaland flag

Jubaland (interim Azania period; see Flag of Azania)

Current Jubaland flag
