= Azania (Somalia) =

Self-proclaimed entity (2011-2013)

Azania: Azania (Somali); أزانيا (Arabic)
- Flag

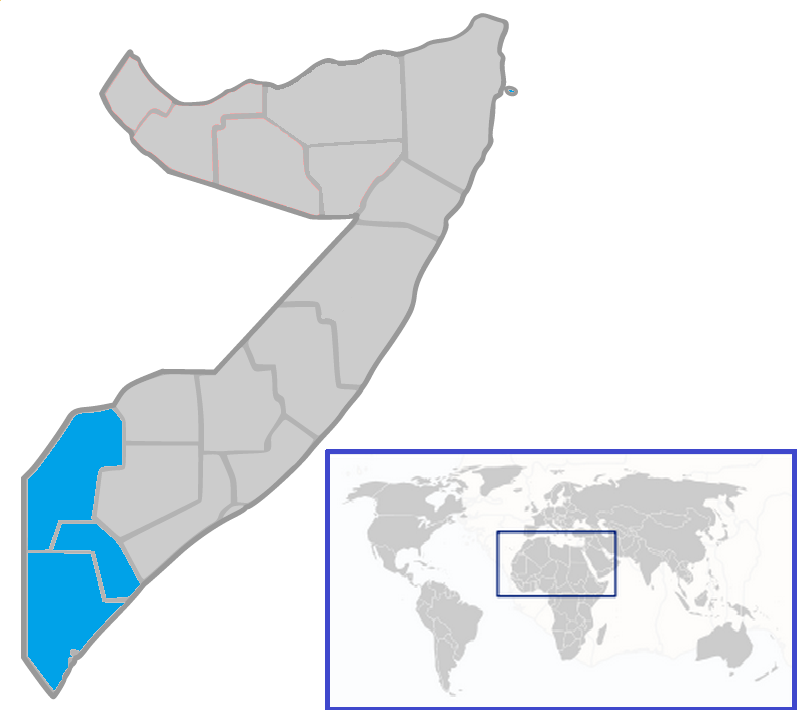
- Capital: Dhobley; Garbahare
- Largest city: Dhobley, Jamame, Kismayo
- Official languages: Somali; Arabic
- Demonym: Somali
- Government: Autonomous presidential republic
  - President: Mohamed Abdi Mohamed Gandhi
  - Vice President: Abdiaziz Osman Mohamud

Establishment
  - Proclaimed: 3 April 2011
  - Dissolved: 15 May 2013
- Currency: Somali shilling (SOS)
- Time zone: UTC+3 (EAT)
  - Summer (DST): UTC+3 (not observed)
- Calling code: +252 (Somalia)
- ISO 3166 code: SO
- Internet TLD: .so
Preceded by	Succeeded by
Jubaland	Jubaland
- The map shows the territories (blue) claimed by Azania.

Azania (Somali: Azaaniya, Arabic: أزانيا), officially the Republic of Azania (Somali: Dawladda Azaaniya), was a self-proclaimed autonomous state of Jubaland in southern Somalia that existed from 2011 to 2013. A group of Somali politicians proclaimed the creation of Azania on 3 April 2011 in Nairobi, with Mohamed Abdi Mohamed Gandhi as President. Abdiaziz Osman Mohamud as Vice President. The state's main intentions were to contest al-Shabaab, which largely controlled Jubaland.

The Government of Kenya supported the creation of Azania to create a buffer state between Kenya and Somalia, and to train and legitimize Azanian militias to fight against al-Shabaab in Jubaland. Kenya further launched Operation Linda Nchi in October 2011, sending in the Kenya Defence Forces to combat al-Shabaab in Jubaland.

Various players in Jubaland, contested the Government of Azania's legitimacy. Azania had little de facto control over its territory between al-Shabaab, Kenya, and other Somali militias. Azania disappeared from notice after delegates formed a new Jubaland government on 15 May 2013, with Raskamboni Movement leader Ahmed Mohamed Islam Madobe as President.

== Background ==
The country of Somalia has been in civil war since 1991, splitting into zones of influence. The group al-Shabaab controlled Jubaland, the region of Somalia that borders Kenya. Al-Shabaab had initiated the 2010 Kampala bombings as revenge for Uganda's support of the African Union Mission to Somalia (AMISOM) and the Transitional Federal Government of Somalia (TFG) . In order to combat terrorism and to resettle Somali refugees who had fled to Kenya, starting around 2010, Kenya sought to create a buffer state between itself and al-Shabaab in Jubaland, on the other side of the Kenya-Somalia border. To that end, Kenya trained about 2,500 fighters under Mohamed Abdi Mohamed (Gandhi), the former Minister of Defence in the TFG. Kenya also lent support to Ahmed Mohamed Islam and the Raskamboni Movement.

== Etymology ==
The name "Azania" is a historical name for various regions of Africa. According to President Gandhi, a trained anthropologist and historian, Azania was selected as the name for the new administration because of its historical importance, as "Azania was a name given to Somalia more than 2,500 years ago and it was given by Egyptian sailors who used to get a lot of food reserves from the Somali Coast. Its origin is [an] Arabic word meaning the land of plenty."

== Declaration of independence ==
On 3 April 2011, after several days of fighting with Kenyan air support, the TFG and the Raskamboni Movement took Dhobley, a town few kilometers from the Kenyan border, from al-Shabaab. On the same day, a Nairobi conference declared the state of Azania (sometimes also referred to as Jubaland) and named Mohamed Abdi Mohamed "Gandhi" to be the President. Gandhi declared that Azania's top priority was to fight al-Shabaab. "Our aim of establishing this administration is to first liberate these regions," he said. "We are not breaking away from Somalia."

Azania's control of Dhobley was contested by a rival Kenya-backed militia, the Raskamboni Movement, which had also fought to take Dhobley. While the Azania project was largely supported by Kenyan intellectual and political circles, Raskamboni had support among Kenyan-Somali officers. In May 2011, TFG officials welcomed a delegation from Azania to Dhobley. However, Raskamboni commanders refused to attend the lunch and a short gun battle erupted between the Azania and Raskamboni groups. Later, a Raskamboni spokesman claimed that there was no conflict with Azania. As of September, both Azania and Raskamboni had forces contesting Dhobley.

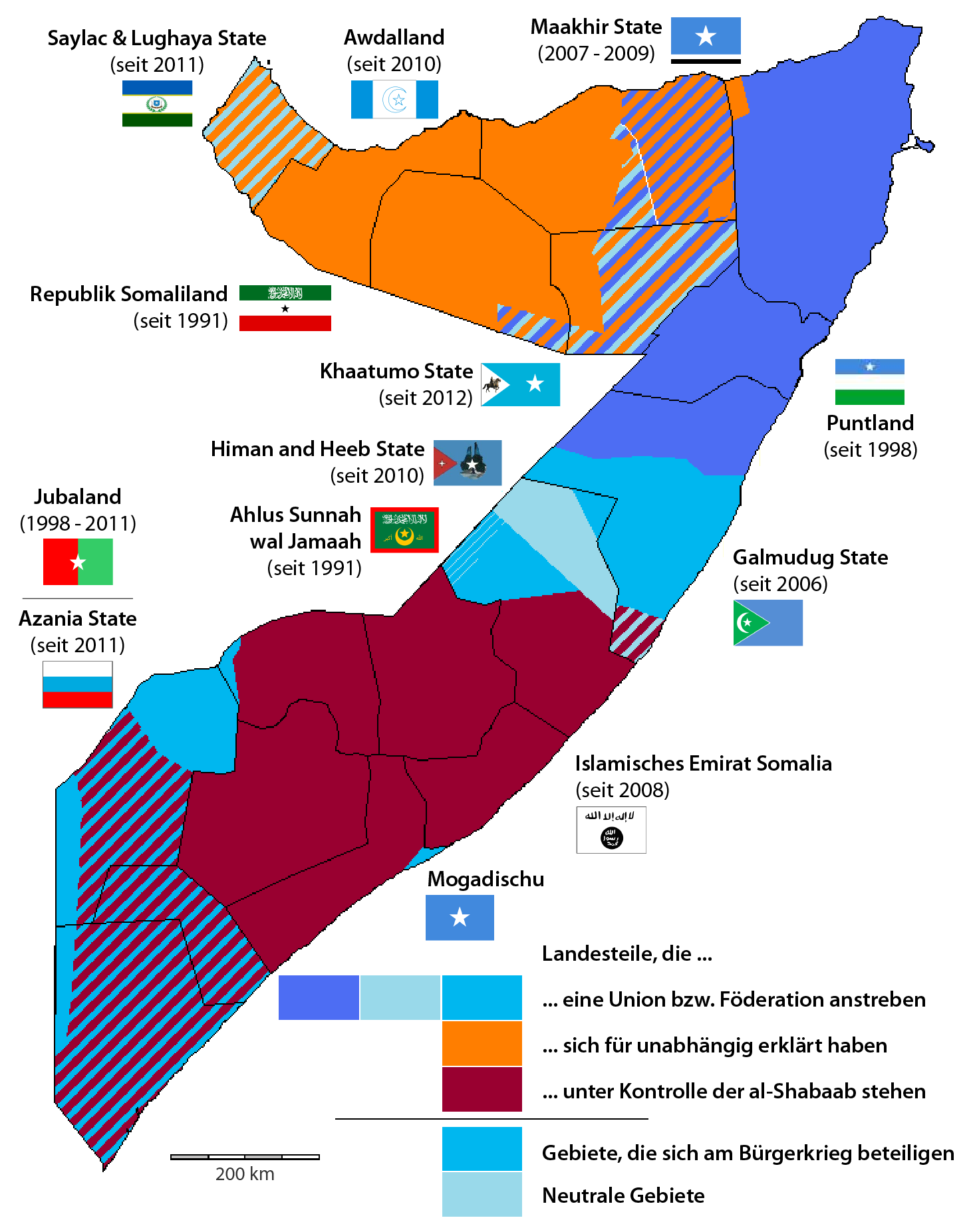
Map of the political situation in Somalia at the time of the proclamation of Azania (in German)

However, Ahlu Sunna Waljamaa'a (ASWJ) also refused to recognize the Azania administration. On 29 June 2011, Mohamed Abdi Kalil, the governor of Gedo region for the TFG, accused the Azania government of having links to al-Shabab and, moreover, fighting alongside them against the TFG.

== International reaction ==
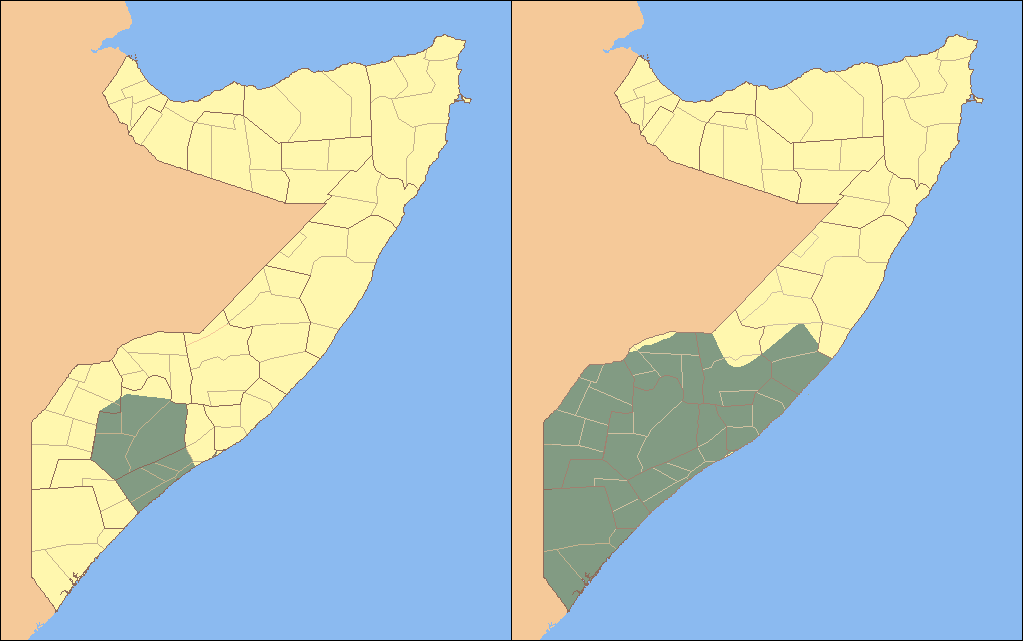
Territorial acquisitions of Harakat al-Shabaab from 31 January 2009 to December 2010

Kenya: Kenya supported Azania and hoped that it would be able to protect the Kenya from the prevailing anarchy in Somalia.

Somalia: The TFG, which aimed to unify Somalia under one government, condemned Azania's declaration of independence.

Ethiopia: The Ethiopian authorities also opposed the creation of this state, as, in their opinion, this could lead to increased separatist sentiment in the ethnic-Somali region of Ogaden.

== Further events ==
In October 2011, Kenya launched Operation Linda Nchi of the Kenyan army (with the support of Ethiopia and the TFG), ending in 2012 with the partial ousting of al-Shabaab and the capture of Kismayo.

By November 2011, Kenya had withdrawn support of Azania due to military under-performance and objections from Ethiopia.

On 15 May 2013, a new autonomous state of Jubaland was proclaimed, headed by Ahmed Mohamed Islam Madobe, the leader of the Raskamboni Movement. The state of Azania was not mentioned afterwards.

== See also ==
- Jubaland
- Ahmed Mohamed Islam
- Mohamed Abdi Mohamed
- Raskamboni Movement
