= Qolobaa Calankeed =

National anthem of Somalia

English: Every nation has its own flag
- Flag of Somalia
- National anthem of Somalia
- Also known as: Qolobaa Calankeedu waa ceynoo
- Lyrics: Hussein Aw-Farah Dubbad (Jubunqtani), 1959
- Music: Abdullahi Qarshe, 1959
- Adopted: 1 August 2012
- Preceded by: “Soomaaliyeey toosoo”

Audio sample
- U.S. Navy Band abridged instrumental version (equivalent to the chorus followed by the first two lines of the chorus / a verse): file; help

"Qolobaa Calankeed" (pronounced [qolobaː ʕalankeːd]; Wadaad script: قلبا علنكئد; English: "Every nation has its own flag") is the national anthem of Somalia. Written and composed by Abdullahi Qarshe, it was adopted on 1 August 2012 with the passage of the Somali national constitution, in which it is enshrined. It replaced "Soomaaliyeey toosoo", which had been in use since 2000. "Soomaaliyeey toosoo" is often still used as a de facto national anthem.

== Lyrics ==
Somali original (Somali Latin alphabet)

Chorus:
(𝄆) Qolobaa (Note: Sometimes written qolabaa [qo.la.baː] or qolaba [qo.la.baː].) calankeedu,
waa ceynoo, (𝄇)
Innaga keenu waa,
Cirkoo kala (Note: Sometimes written kale [ka.le].) ee,
aan caadna lahayn,
Ee caashaqaye.

I
(𝄆) Xiddigyahay caddi waad,
Naa ciidamisee, (𝄇)
Carradaa keligaa
adow curadee,
cadceedda sideeda,
caan noqo ee!

Chorus

II
(𝄆) Cashadaad dhalataa (Note: Sometimes written Cishadaad dhalataad [ʕi.ʃa.daːd ɖa.la.taːd].)
caloosheennee, (Note: Sometimes written calooshaydii [ʕa.loː.ʃaj.diː].) (𝄇)
Sidii culaygii
cidaad marisee,
Allow ha ku celin,
"Cawooy!" dhahe ee

Chorus

III
(𝄆) Shanteena cududood
Cadkii ka maqnaa (𝄇)
Adow celiyow
Nacaawimayee
Waa calaf cimrigu
Isku keen simayee

Somali original (Osmanya script)

Chorus:
(𝄆) 𐒎𐒙𐒐𐒙𐒁𐒛 𐒋𐒖𐒐𐒖𐒒𐒏𐒜𐒆𐒚,
𐒓𐒛 𐒋𐒗𐒕𐒒𐒝, (𝄇)
𐒘𐒒𐒒𐒖𐒌𐒖 𐒏𐒜𐒒𐒚 𐒓𐒛,
𐒋𐒘𐒇𐒏𐒝 𐒏𐒖𐒐𐒗 𐒜,
𐒛𐒒 𐒋𐒛𐒆𐒒𐒖 𐒐𐒖𐒔𐒖𐒕𐒒𐒝,
𐒜 𐒋𐒛𐒉𐒖𐒎𐒖 𐒜.

I
(𝄆) 𐒄𐒘𐒆𐒘𐒌𐒕𐒖𐒔𐒖𐒌 𐒋𐒖𐒆𐒆𐒘 𐒓𐒛𐒆,
𐒒𐒛 𐒋𐒕𐒆𐒖𐒑𐒘𐒈𐒜, (𝄇)
𐒋𐒖𐒇𐒇𐒖𐒆𐒛 𐒏𐒖𐒐𐒌𐒛
𐒛𐒆𐒘𐒌𐒖 𐒚 𐒋𐒚𐒇𐒖𐒆 𐒜
𐒋𐒖𐒆𐒋𐒜𐒆𐒖 𐒈𐒘𐒆𐒜𐒆𐒖
𐒐𐒖 𐒋𐒛𐒒 𐒒𐒙𐒎𐒙 𐒜𐒕

Chorus

II
(𝄆) 𐒋𐒘𐒉𐒖𐒆𐒛𐒆 𐒊𐒖𐒐𐒖𐒂𐒛𐒆
𐒋𐒖𐒐𐒝𐒉𐒖𐒕𐒆𐒕 (𝄇)
𐒈𐒘𐒆𐒕 𐒋𐒚𐒐𐒖𐒕𐒌𐒕
𐒋𐒘𐒆𐒛𐒆 𐒑𐒖𐒇𐒘𐒈𐒜
𐒔𐒖 𐒏𐒚 𐒋𐒗𐒐𐒘𐒒
𐒋𐒖𐒓𐒙𐒕 𐒊𐒖𐒔𐒗 𐒜

Chorus

III
(𝄆) 𐒉𐒔𐒖𐒒𐒂𐒜𐒒𐒖 𐒋𐒚𐒆𐒚𐒆𐒝𐒆
𐒋𐒖𐒆𐒏𐒕 𐒏𐒖 𐒑𐒖𐒎𐒒𐒛 (𝄇)
𐒛𐒆𐒙𐒓 𐒋𐒗𐒐𐒘𐒕𐒙𐒓
𐒒𐒖𐒋𐒛𐒓𐒘𐒑𐒖𐒕𐒜
𐒓𐒛 𐒋𐒖𐒐𐒖𐒍 𐒋𐒘𐒑𐒇𐒘𐒌𐒚
𐒙𐒈𐒏𐒚 𐒏𐒜𐒒 𐒈𐒘𐒑𐒖𐒕𐒜

Somali original (Wadaad's writing)

Chorus:
(𝄇) قلبا علنكئد
وا عينو (𝄆)
انغ كئن وا
عركو كل أى
أى عاشق أى
حدغيهي عدواد

١
(𝄇) حدغيهي عد واد
نا عيدمسي (𝄆)
عردا كلغا
ادغ او عرد أى
عدعئد سدئد
ل عان نق أىي

Chorus

٢
(𝄇) عشداد طلتاد
علوشيدى (𝄆)
سدى عليغى
عداد مرسئ
ه ك علن
عوي طه أى

Chorus

٣
(𝄇) شنتين عددود
عدكي ك مقنا (𝄆)
ادو عليو
نعاوميي
وا علف عمرگ
اسك كين سميي

IPA transcription (Note: See Help:IPA, Somali Latin alphabet and Somali phonology.)

(𝄆) [qo.lo.baː ʕa.lan.keː.du]
[waː ʕej.noː] (𝄇)
[in.na.ga keː.nu waː]
[ʕir.koː ka.la eː]
[aːn ʕaːd.na la.hajn]
[eː ʕaː.ʃa.qa.jeː]

1
(𝄆) [ħid̪.d̪ig.ja.haj ʕad.di waːd]
[naː ʕiː.da.mi.seː] (𝄇)
[ʕar.ra.daː ke.li.gaː]
[a.dow ʕu.ra.deː]
[ʕad.ʕeːd.da si.deː.da]
[ʕaːn no.qo eː]

Chorus

2
(𝄆) [ʕa.ʃa.daːd ɖa.la.taː]
[ʕa.lowː.ʃeːn.naː] (𝄇)
[si.diː ʕu.laj.giː]
[ʕi.daːd ma.ri.seː]
[al.low ha ku ʕe.lin]
[ʕa.woːj ɖa.he eː]

Chorus

3
(𝄆) [ʃan.t̪eːna ʕu.du.doːd]
[ʕad.kiː ka maq.naː] (𝄇)
[a.dow ʕe.li.jow]
[na.ʕaː.wi.ma.jeː]
[waː ʕa.laf ʕim.ri.gu]
[is.ku keːn si.ma.jeː]

Official English translation

Chorus:
(𝄆) Any nation's flag,
bears its own colour (𝄇)
The sky (above us),
does ours look like
Defects it has none;
love it with candor

I
(𝄆) Oh you White Star,
at your service we are (𝄇)
Superior you are,
in any part of our land
Be famous oh Star,
like the sun (of the far)

Chorus

II
(𝄆) On the day you arose,
our hearts you have (𝄇)
Purified with pureness,
(Oh you our flag)
Lord may not dim you,
pray we in this night

Chorus

III
(𝄆) The detached part of,
our forces of five (𝄇)
I beseech from God,
their return you cause
This fate that wrote,
for us to meet now

== See also ==
- History of Somalia
- Flag of Somalia
- National anthem of Somalia (1960–2000), the Somali national anthem from 1960 to 2000
- "Soomaaliyeey toosoo", the Somali national anthem from 2000 to 2012
