= 1959 British Somaliland parliamentary election =

Parliamentary elections were held in British Somaliland on 18 March 1959, the first elections in the territory. They were boycotted by the Somali National League, allowing the moderate National United Front to win a majority of the elected seats.

== Background ==
The Legislative Council was established in 1957, and initially consisted of the Governor, 3 ex officio members, five government officials and six members appointed by the Governor. Constitutional reforms in 1958 increased the council to 30 members; the Governor, 15 officials, two appointed members and 12 elected members.

== Electoral system ==
The 12 elected members were elected from six two-member constituencies. Three urban constituencies (Hargeisa, Berbera and Burao) had direct elections, whilst the members in the three rural constituencies were elected by the shirs (open councils).

In the rural constituencies all men over the age of 21 were allowed to participate in the shirs. In urban areas people could qualify to vote if they owned or rented land or a house, owned a registered car, 10 camels or cattle or 100 sheep, owned a trade licence, or had been in public service or employment for at least two years. Only 2,508 people registered to vote in the three urban constituencies.

Candidates were required to own or rent land worth at least 5,000 shillings, a monthly income of at least 300 shillings or individual ownership of at least 10 camels or cows or 100 sheep, or family ownership of at least 40 camels or cattle or 400 sheep, or own an agricultural licence.

== Campaign ==
The elections were boycotted by the Somali National League, who had demanded an elected majority in the Legislative Council. The party also claimed the British authorities would rig the vote to prevent it winning. Seven of the 12 seats were uncontested, resulting in no vote taking place.

== Results ==
Party	Votes	%	Seats
National United Front			7
Other parties			5
Total			12
Total votes	8,014	–	
Registered voters/turnout		86	
Source: Sternberger et al.
