= Mohamed Abdi Mohamed =

Somali geologist, anthropologist, historian, and politician (1949–2021)

Mohamed Abdi Mohamed (Gandhi) محمد عبدي محمد
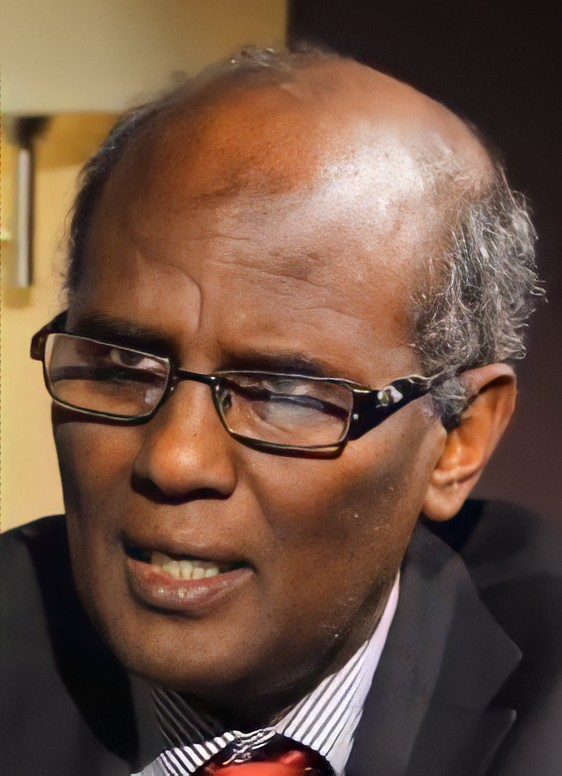

Ambassador of Somalia to Canada
- In office 17 July 2014 – 18 April 2021
- Prime Minister: Abdiweli Sheikh Ahmed

Minister of Defence of Somalia
- In office February 2009 – 12 November 2010
- Prime Minister: Omar Abdirashid Ali Sharmarke
- Preceded by: Nur Hassan Hussein
- Succeeded by: Abdihakim Mohamoud Haji-Faqi

Personal details
- Born: 1949 Somalia
- Died: 18 April 2021 (aged 71–72)
- Party: Transitional Federal Government

Mohamed Abdi Mohamed (Gandhi) (Somali: Maxamed Cabdi Maxamed «Gaandi», Arabic: محمد عبدي محمد; 1949 – 18 April 2021) was a Somali geologist, anthropologist, historian and politician. He was the former Minister of Defense of Somalia, and the former President of Azania (Jubbaland). In July 2014, Gandhi was appointed Somalia's Ambassador to Canada.

== Biography ==
Professor Mohamed Abdi Xaji-Mohamed, nicknamed "Gandhi", was a candidate for Somali president 2021. He was a Somali politician, scholar, writer & double Ph.D., holder. He served as a Somali member of Parliament since 2009. Professor Gandhi previously served as a Defense Secretary and Minister of Air and Transportation in the Somali Transitional Federal Government.

From childhood, Mohamed was a great student and managed to memorize the Koran at an early age. He excelled in his elementary schooling as well. He was accepted to the most prestigious high school at the time, Jamal Abdelnazer High School, in the Somali capital of Mogadishu, where he graduated as an honor student in 1970. He was one of the top students in his high school and the entire country for that year and was awarded a full scholarship to go to France for higher education.

He arrived in France in October 1972 to attend Besançon University. There he majored in geology and graduated with a B. A. in September 1976. He continued to acquire his Master of Science in Geology in 1979. He obtained his Ph.D. in applied geology in June 1983. The title of his thesis was "Study of Geology and Hydrogeology of the Central Somalia Basin (Somali Democratic Republic)". After graduation, Gandhi started lecturing at the same university.

Prof. Gandhi pursued another major (history and civilization of antiquity) and received his second Ph.D. in 1990. Through that decade, the professor continued lecturing at the University of Besançon, France. Prof. Gandhi received his Certificate in Anthropology of Space, March 1992, at the University of New Lisbon, in Portugal under the Erasmus exchange. In addition to that, he received a Higher Degree in Research (HDR) from Besançon University in Besançon, France. Prof. Gandhi was awarded an International Baccalaureate Diploma from the French Academy, and served as a senior program advisor of UNDP Somalia in Disarmament, Demobilization, and Reintegration (DDR).

Prof. Mohamed Abdi Gandhi was an active participant in the Somali peace process and was a Lead Consultant in Mapping the Somali Civil Society. He chaired the Technical Committee at the Arta Somali Peace process in Arta, Djibouti, and Somali Peace and Reconciliation Conference held in Kenya.

Mohamed Abdi Mohamed was an accomplished author; he has published 12 books and more than 50 scientific articles in various academic journals. He has also edited three studies.

Gandhi recently announced that he would be contesting the upcoming President Election 2021 in Somalia.

=== Professional activities ===
During his studies in France, Prof. Gandhi returned every year in Somalia to teach and support as a Professor in the Departments of History and Geology at the University of Mogadishu. Since 1987 Professor was a consultant to the National Museum of Somalia (since 1988), which he had set the task of identifying and classifying ancient manuscripts (especially those held by the Sheikhs and clan leaders) to build a directory of literary (oral or written) and objects of art. Prof. Gandhi was the co-founding member of the Association Somali Peace Line, Paris, 1996.

Prof. Gandhi worked as a consultant to "Doctors Without Borders" from Switzerland, Spain, and other international organizations between Jan 2006-Feb 2007, where they built schools and training centers for nurses' clinics in Kulbiyoow, Lower Jubba, and the surrounding area where his beloved mother was born. Besides, Professor Gandhi built a mosque and education center for the midwife-nurse clinic to remember his beloved mother.

Professor Gandhi worked as Consultant Expert to UNESCO between 1995 and 1998, where he wrote many books and articles, including:

- Somali Translation of Poems for a Poetry of Anthology of African sub-Saharan Africa, published in 1995 under the direction of Bernard Magnier who was conducting an inventory of intellectuals and nongovernmental organizations Somali opening for peace in Somalia published 10/25/1995.
- "How to involve women in the Somali peace process," Program for Culture of Peace, UNESCO published 1998.
- "Women and the Somali Peace" Program for Culture of Peace, UNESCO published 1998.
- "Dictionary of the People", companies from Africa, America, Asia and Oceania, under the direction of Jean-Christophe Tamisier, and Larousse-Bordas, 1998.

Professor Gandhi was an Associate Member of the Institute of Science and Techniques of the Ancient World (ISTA), CNRS, ESA 6048 (since 1992), he was still a supervisor of the research.

Prof. Gandhi worked as Research Officer 1st Class March 1999-February 2001 IRD: at the Institute of Development Research (formerly ORSTOM).

Gandhi was the Technical Committee Chairman for the Conference for Peace held at Arta in Djibouti (Republic of Djibouti), from March to September 2000.

- Consultant for UNOPS, Somali Civil Protection Program 2001 and consultant advisor to the UNDP.

Senior Program Advisor, SCPP, UNDP, 2002.

- Principal Consultant Mapping of Somali Civil Society Organizations, NOVIB, Somalia, 2002.
- Representative of civil society in the peace process in El-Doret and Nairobi (Kenya), October 2002 to November 2004.

Administrative activities: Creation of "Somali Studies" in France and Europe edition of collected works. Co-founding member of the French Association of Somali Studies (established 1986) and the European Association of Somali Studies (established 1990). To bring together researchers "Somaliazation" Europe, these associations have organized several seminars and cultural events. Professor Gandhi was responsible for preparing the following events: The first conference of Somali Studies, Paris, IMA, 11–13 July 1988 in collaboration with Mrs. Danièle Kintz and Mr. Osman Omar Rabah;

Second Conference of Somali Studies, Besançon, 8–11 October 1990 and accompanying exhibitions (Dole and Besançon); Forum: "The civil war in Somalia: When and How? Why?", Paris, IMA, 7–8 April 1992; Forum: "Peace and Reconciliation in Somalia," Paris, IMA, 15–17 April 1993; Congress of Somali Studies on the theme "For a Culture of Peace in Somalia," Paris, 25–27 October 1995.

During his time as a Defense Minister, Professor Gandhi organized and held a meeting in Washington, D.C. that he aimed to bring together former high-ranking officers from the military, police, custodial and intelligence services for in-depth discussions on both the historical background of the Somali security forces and on the re-establishment and the strengthening of the capacity of the security sector institutions in Somalia. He proposed a 36 thousand strong army led by former Somali senior military to revive the Somali nationhood.

== Political career ==
=== Minister of Defense ===
On February 21, 2009, Gandhi was appointed Somalia's Minister of Defense by the nation's then head of government, Prime Minister Omar Abdirashid Ali Sharmarke. He held the position until November 10, 2010.

=== President of Azania ===
On April 3, 2011, the establishment of a new autonomous region in southern Somalia was announced. Referred to as Azania (formerly Jubaland), the nascent polity was led by Gandhi, who was serving as its first President. According to President Gandhi, Azania was selected as the name for the new administration because of its historical importance, as "Azania was a name given to Somalia more than 2,500 years ago and it was given by Egyptian sailors who used to get a lot of food reserves from the Somali Coast[...] Its origin is [an] Arabic word meaning the land of plenty."

Gandhi's first stated policy initiative was to remove the Al Shabaab group of militants from the territory.

Gandhi held President of Jubaland's position until May 15, 2013, when Ahmed Mohamed Islam was elected to the office.

=== Ambassador of Somalia to Canada ===
In July 2014, Gandhi was appointed Somalia's new Ambassador to Canada. The first such envoy in over two decades, he headed the Somali federal government's reopened embassy in Ottawa, Ontario.
