= Mohammed Awale Liban =

Somali scholar, and the designer of the flag of Somalia

- محمد عوالي ليبان

Chief of Staff to the President of Somalia
- In office 1960–1967
- President: Aden Abdulle Osman

Director General of Personnel
- In office 1967–1969
- President: Abdirashid Ali Sharmarke

Personal details
- Born: 1919 Galkayo, Italian Somalia
- Died: June 5, 2001 Toronto, Canada
- Party: Somali Youth League
- Occupation: Scholar

Hagi Mohammed Awale Liban (Somali: Maxamed Cawaale Liibaan, Arabic: محمد عوالي ليبان) was a Somali scholar. He is noted for having designed the flag of Somalia in 1954. Liban also later served as the Chief of Cabinet of the Presidency in the nascent Somali Republic during the Aden Adde administration. Under President Abdirashid Ali Sharmarke, he was director general of personnel, that is, the head of the civil service. He retired after the military coup and, in 1991, emigrated to Canada.

== Biography ==
Awale was a nationalist who served in all Somali governments up until 1964. He maintained good relationships with the administration of Aden Abdule Osman

Awale hailed from the Reer Maxamuud, Majerteen clan, who are predominantly based in Mudug region. His nephew is Abukar Awale 'Qaad-diid', a prominent Somali who passionately campaigns against Qaad and highlights its ill effects both within Somalia and with diaspora.

== Somali flag ==
In 1949, the United Nations decided that Somalia would be under the control of Italy as a trusteeship for ten years. Three other countries, Egypt, Philippines, and Colombia, were part of a United Nations commission sent to advise the trusteeship in Somalia. In April 1950, Italy took over from the British military administration. In early 1954, the Italian trusteeship, along with the United Nations advisory council, created a legislative council. This council included Somalis, Italians, Arabs, and Indians. Their job was to prepare laws for Somalia during the trusteeship. Members of this council were chosen by political parties, foreign communities, and other organizations, not by elections.

Mohamed Awale Liban was chosen by the Somali Labor Trade Union. When the council discussed creating a national flag for Somalia, Liban suggested that only the Somali members should decide on the flag. His suggestion was accepted, and a Somali chairman, Sheikh Omar, was chosen to lead the meeting. The debate on the flag was postponed until the next day.

That night, Liban went home and designed a flag. It was blue with a white star in the middle. Each point of the star represented the five Somali regions (Greater Somalia) that had been divided by colonial powers.

The next day, Liban presented the flag to the council. One member cheered and clapped for five minutes when Liban revealed the design. The chairman praised Liban for creating such a beautiful flag in less than 24 hours. Liban explained that the blue stood for the United Nations, which had helped Somalia on its path to independence. The white represented peace and prosperity, and the star symbolized the five Somali regions consist (British Somaliland, French Somaliland now Djibouti, Somali Region, Northern Frontier District and Italian Somaliland).

== Death ==
On June 5, 2001, Mohamed Awale Liban died in Toronto, Canada.
