= Flag of Somalia =

Federal Republic of Somalia
- Use: National flag and ensign
- Proportion: 2:3
- Adopted: 12 October 1954; 72 years ago
- Design: A single white five-pointed star centered on a blue field
- Designed by: Mohammed Awale Liban

The national flag of Somalia (Note: Somali: Calanka Soomaaliya; Arabic: العلم الصومالي, romanised: aleilm Alsuwmaliu) was adopted on October 12, 1954, and was designed by Mohammed Awale Liban. The flag was initially used within the Trust Territory of Somaliland before being adopted by the short-lived State of Somaliland and the Somali Republic. It is an ethnic flag for the Somali people. The white five-pointed star represents the five regions in which the Somalis reside.

== History ==
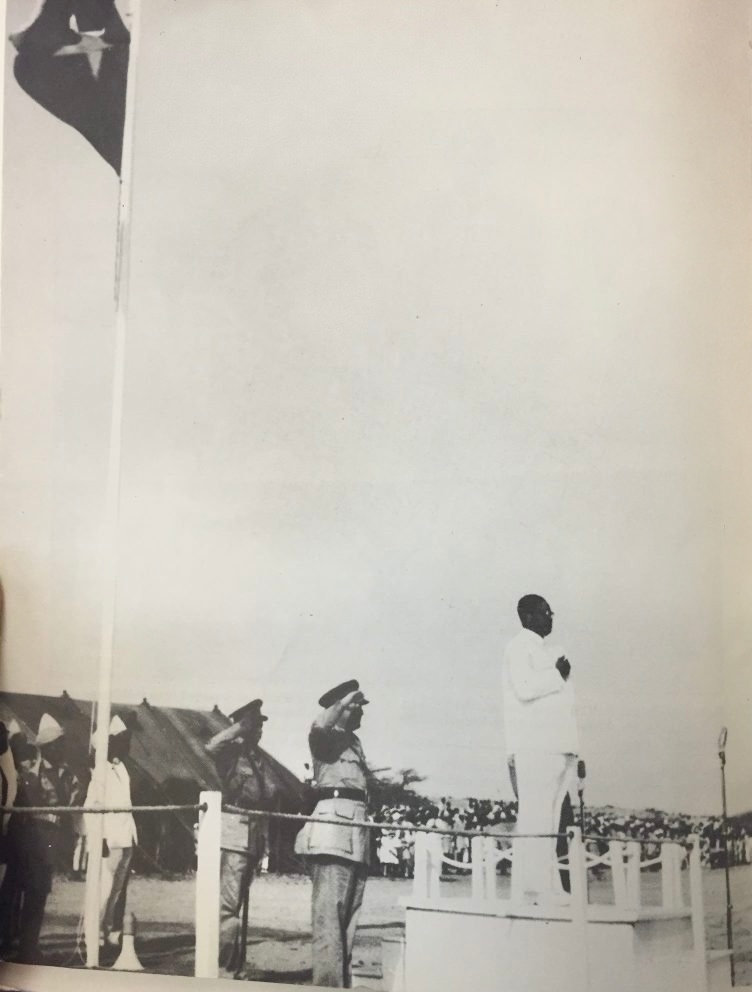
Somali flag at the Independence celebrations for State of Somaliland (currently under the de facto Republic of Somaliland control) on 26 June 1960

Beginning in the mid-19th century, areas in the Horn of Africa populated by Somalis were divided between Ethiopia, France, Great Britain, and Italy. Soon after the creation of the UN Trust Territory of Somaliland during 1950, the Somali Youth League persistently advocated for the creation of a national flag. This was rejected by Italian administrators of the Trusteeship until 1954, when a debate was opened in the territorial council. The SYL, being the most popular political organization in the country, initially sought to use their party's flag, but was rejected outright by rival parties. A deadlock ensued until it was broken by the Somali scholar Mohammed Awale Liban who suggested a different symbol from the ones proposed. Liban personally conceived of and designed the flag which was approved by the territorial council on 12 October 1954. A flag of the same design was also used by the short-lived independent State of Somaliland between 26 June 1960 and 1 July 1960.

=== In the Republic of Somaliland ===
Public display of the flag of Somalia is strictly prohibited in the self-declared Republic of Somaliland since 1991. SSC-Khatumo, which occupies the eastern territory it claims, still uses the Somali flag.

== Characteristics ==
Somalia's coat of arms

As an ethnic flag, the five-pointed white Star of Unity in its center represents the main five areas where the Somali ethnic group form the indigenous majority: Djibouti (former French colony), Somaliland (former British protectorate), the Somali region in formerly Italian Ethiopia, the North Eastern Province in formerly British Kenya, and Somalia (former Italian colony). It now officially denotes the sky as well as the Gulf of Aden, Guardafui Channel and the Somali Sea, which flank the country. The blue color of the flag was selected in tribute to the United Nations who helped to form the country of Somalia during its status as a trust territory from 1950–1960.

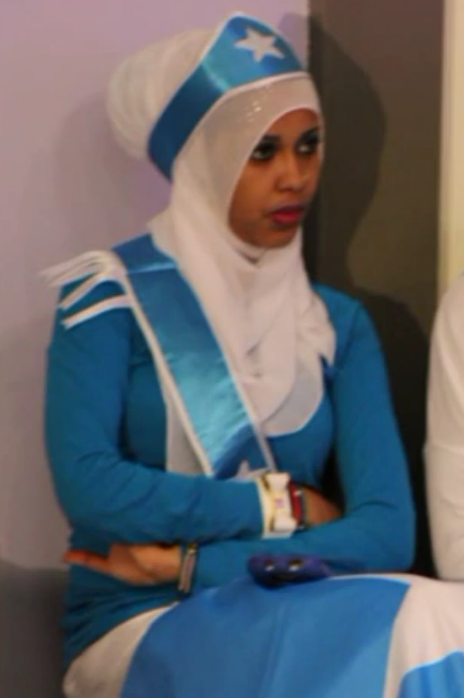
Somali woman wearing a Somali flag dress.

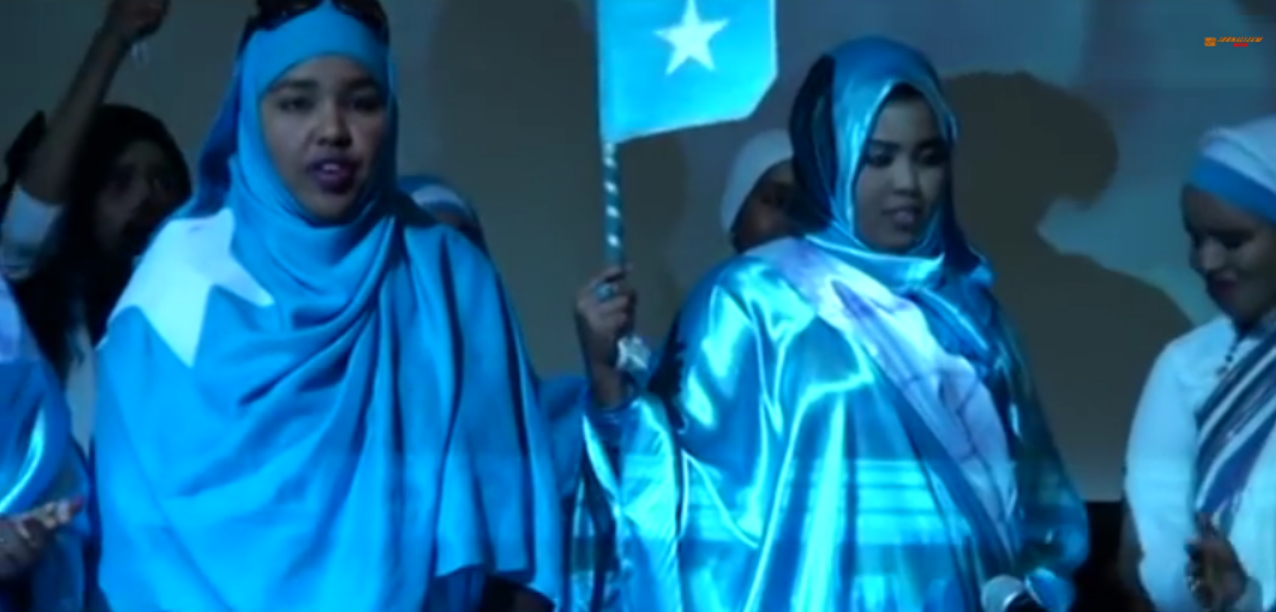
Somali women at a Khatumo State launch ceremony wearing the Somali flag.

=== Colors ===
Somalia	Sky blue	White
RGB	65/143/222	255/255/255
Hexadecimal	#418FDE	#FFFFFF
CMYK	71/36/0/13	0/0/0/0

== Historical flags ==
The following are the flags historically used in the territory of present-day Somalia:

=== Pre-colonial states ===
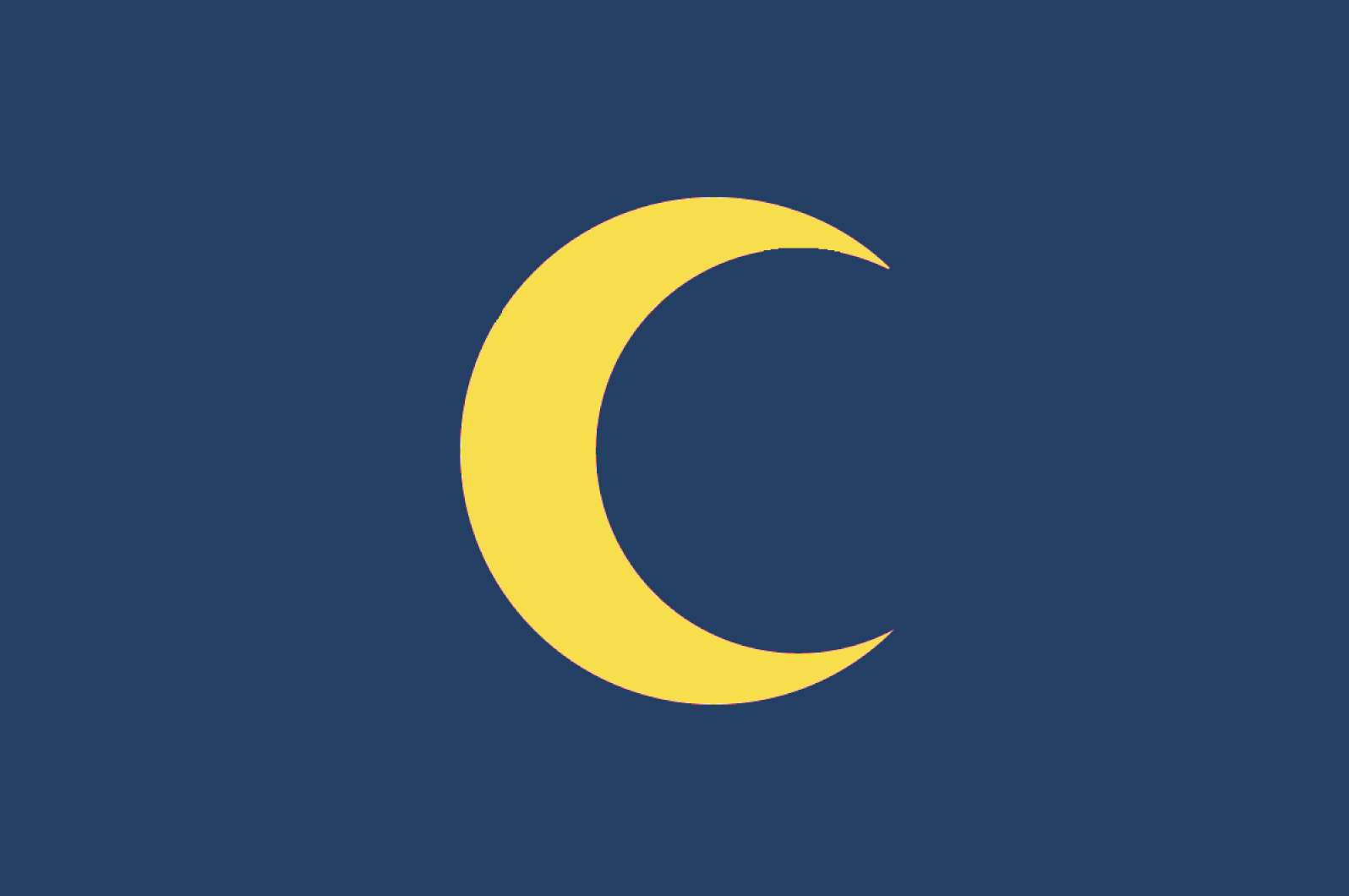
flag of the Sultanate of Mogadishu (10th century–16th century)

Flag of the Ajuran Empire (13th century–17th century)

Flag of the Adal Sultanate (1415–1577)

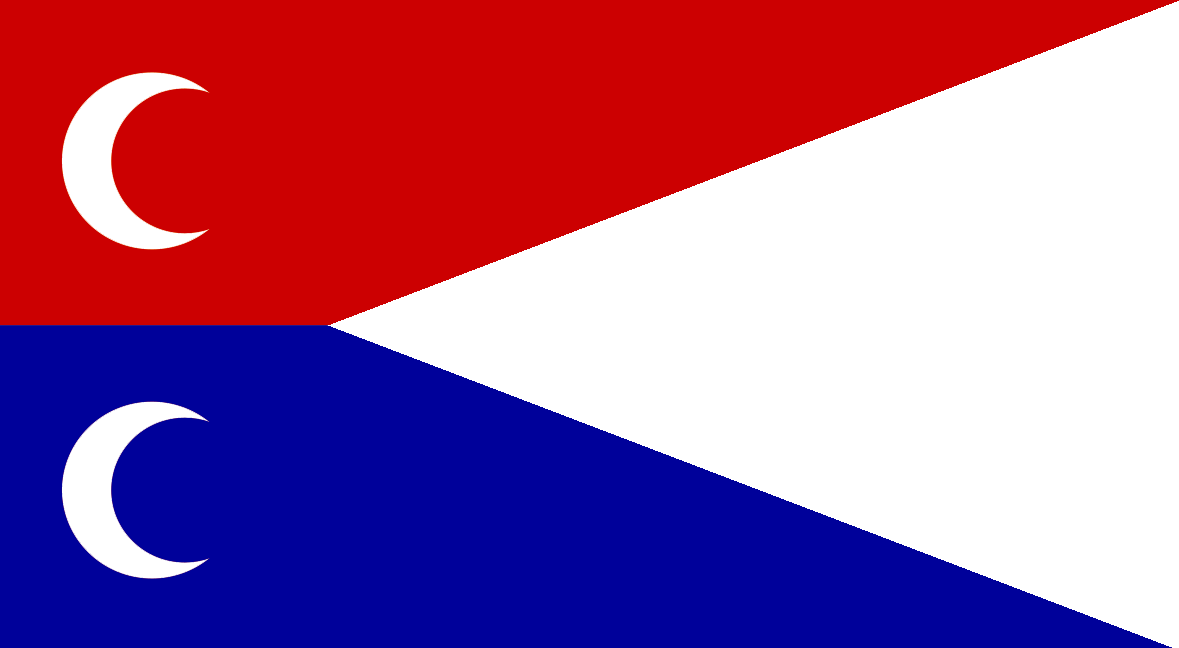
Flag of the Hiraab Imamate (17th century–19th century)

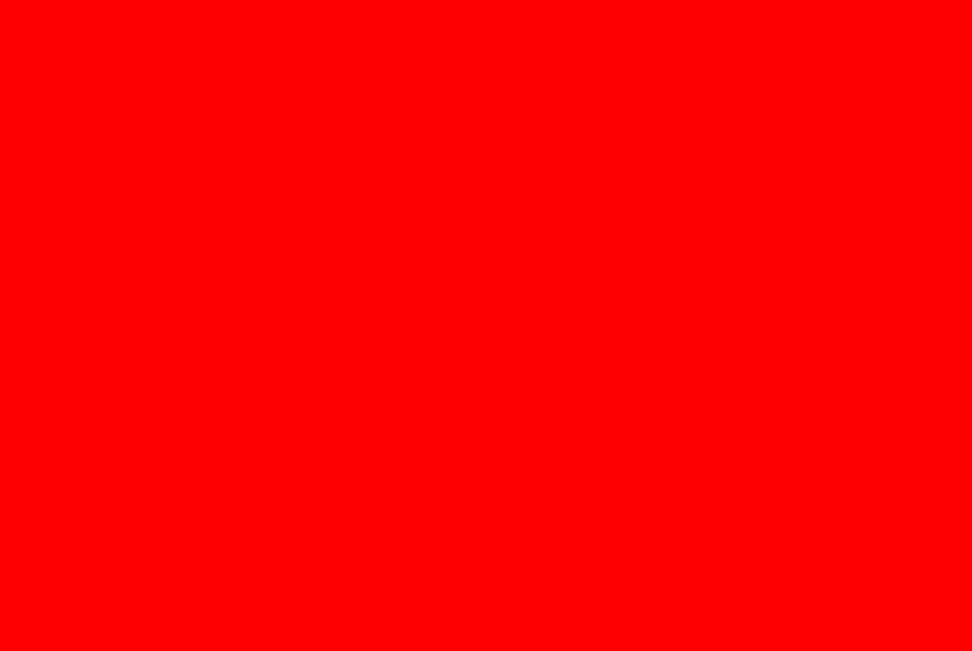
Flag of the Majeerteen Sultanate (1648–1927)

Religious banner of the Isaaq Sultanate derived from an Adal Sultanate flag (1700s–1884)

=== Italian Somalia ===
Flag of Italian Somaliland (1889–1941)

Flag of Italian Somaliland under British occupation (1941-1950)

Flag of Italy used in the Trust Territory of Somaliland (1950–1960)

Flag of the United Nations (1950–1960)

Co-official/secondary flag of Trust Territory of Somaliland (1954–1960)

=== British Somaliland ===
Flag of the United Kingdom used in British Somaliland (1884–1903)

Flag of the British Raj used in British Somaliland (1884–1898)

Flag of British Somaliland (1903–1950)

Flag of British Somaliland (1950–1952)

Flag of British Somaliland (1952–1960)

Flag of State of Somaliland (26 June 1960 – 1 July 1960)

== Subnational flags ==
=== Federal Member States ===
Flag of Banaadir

Flag of Galmudug

Flag of Hirshabelle

Flag of Jubaland

Flag of Somaliland (claimed)

Flag of North East

Flag of Puntland

Flag of South West

== See also ==
=== Related articles ===
- Coat of arms of Somalia
- List of Somali flags
- "Soomaaliyeey toosoo", former national anthem
- "Qolobaa Calankeed", current national anthem
- History of Somalia
- Flag of Somaliland

=== Similar flags ===
- Bonnie Blue flag
- Flag of Minnesota
- Flag of the Republic of West Florida
- Flag of Vietnam
