= Soomaaliyeey toosoo =

2000–2012 national anthem of Somalia

Soomaaliyeey Toosoo
English: Somalis, Wake Up
- National anthem of Somalia
- Lyrics: Ali Mire Awale was the author and partly Yusuf Haji Adam, 1947
- Adopted: July 1, 2000
- Relinquished: August 1, 2012
- Preceded by: National anthem of Somalia
- Succeeded by: "Qolobaa Calankeed"

"Soomaaliyeey Toosoo" ("Somalis, Wake Up") was the national anthem of Somalia from 2000 until August 2012. It was adopted by the Transitional National Government, replacing the unnamed former national anthem.

Though contested, the majority believe the lyrics of the earlier Somali national anthem were composed by Yusuf Haji Adam and Ali Mire Awale.

== History ==
"Soomaaliyeey Toosoo" is a well-known Somali song that dates from the early 1940s. It was first composed by Yusuf Haji Adam and Ali Mire Awale, sometime in the 1940s.

It was sung to mark independence day on July 1, 1960, and was regularly performed by children in the mornings at schools. "Soomaaliyeey Toosoo" was officially adopted in July 2000 to mark the 40th anniversary of Somali independence.

In August 2012, following the endorsement of Somalia's new Provisional Constitution, "Soomaaliyeey Toosoo" was replaced as the national anthem by "Qolobaa Calankeed".

== Lyrics ==
Original Somali lyrics (1947)

Soomaliyeey Toosoo
Toosoo isku tiirsada eey
Hadba kiina taag daraneey
Taageera weligiineey.

Chorus

Sharcigay isku kiin tolayoo
Luuqadaa tu waaxid ahoo
Arligiina taaka ahoo
Kuma kala tegeysaanee

Tiro adhi ah oo dhaxalaa
Sideed laydiin soo tubayoo
Ninba toban la meel marayoo
Cadowgiin idiin talin oo

Tulud geel ah oo dhacan baad
Toogasho u badheedhanee
Ma dhulkeeni oo tegey baan
cidi dhagax u tuurayneey

Qaran aan hubkuu tumayo
Tooreyda dhaafayn oo
Oo aan taar samayn karin
Uur ku taallo weynaa

Hadba waxaan laa ooyaayoo
ilmadu iiga qubaneysaa
Ikhtiyaar nin loo diidoo
La addoon sadaan ahayee

Another version also existed, which is a longer variant.

Somali original

Soomaaliyey toosoo,
Toosoo isku tiirsadaye,
Hadba kiina taag darane'e!
Taageera weligiinee hee!
Qaar baa qabriga galayo,
Qaar baa bad lagu qabaye,
Qaar baa qurbaha degayo'o,
Qaribaaya dhaqankiiye'e!
Ummadeena kala qubataa,
Qalbiga uga ooyaayoo'oo,
Qaxarkiyo dhibta badan baa,
Quudba qaadan waayee hee hee!
Soomaaliyey toosoo,
Toosoo isku tiirsadaye hee,
Hadba kiina taag darane'e!
Taageera weligiinee!
Sida aadmiga kale'e,
Aayaha ma derisnaaye'e?
Mise ururo kala raaciyaa!
Aarsashaan ku maqanahaye'e?
Qorigiyo qabiil daran baa!
Qarankeenii baabiiyo'oo!
Naga dhigay qaxooti baxoo!
Quudhsadaan aduunyada'e!
Soomaaliyey toosoo,
Toosoo isku tiirsadaye,
Hadba kiina taag darane'e!
Taageera weligiine'ee!
Calankeena dahabka'a iyo,
Ciideena dooga ahee!
Inagaa dirir ku aaseynoo,
Is dilnaa ma dowbaa'ee?
Maalintaan kurbada bi'inee,
Gobonimo kow nidhiye'e,
Konton sanee ku buuxdaayoo,
Mana hadhin haraadkiiye!
Soomaaliyey toosoo,
Toosoo isku tiirsadaye,
Hadba kiina taag darane'e!
Taageera weligiine'ee!
Bal hadaaynaan is daba qabanin,
Waan dabar go'aynaayoo,
Ummaddoo shisheeyaa baa!
Carigeena soo dagaye'ee!
Calanyahow tilmaam wacan baa,
Midabkaagu taam ku yahoo,
Xidigtii na tirinaysaa,
Dhexda kaaga sii taala'e!
Soomaaliyey toosoo,
Toosoo isku tiirsadaye,
Hadba kiina taag darane'e!
Taageera weligiine'ee!
Dad walaala aanu nahayo!
Waa laysku keen diraye'e!
Nacabkeenii inoo daran baa!
Dabina inaga'o dhigaye'e!
Ina dhaaf asaageynoo!
Inala degan adduunyadu'e,
Dhimashiyo mid uun nololeed!
Dhan uun ma isku raacnaaye'e!
Soomaaliyey toosoo,
Toosoo isku tiirsadaye,
Hadba kiina taag darane'e!
Taageera weligiine'ee!
Waxa aan la ooyaayoo!
Ilmadu iga qubaysaa!
Iqtiyaar nin loo diidoo!
La adoonsadaan ahaye'e!
Dumarkiy ocarruurtii baa!
La dareersanaayaayoo!
Duniday baryaayaanee!
Ma dareemin weliye'e!
Soomaaliyey toosoo,
Toosoo isku tiirsadaye,
Hadba kiina taag darane'e!
Taageera weligiine'ee!

Osmanya script

𐒈𐒝𐒑𐒛𐒐𐒘𐒕𐒗𐒕 𐒂𐒝𐒈𐒝,
𐒂𐒝𐒈𐒝 𐒘𐒈𐒏𐒚 𐒂𐒕𐒇𐒈𐒖𐒆𐒖𐒕𐒗,
𐒔𐒖𐒆𐒁𐒖 𐒏𐒕𐒒𐒖 𐒂𐒛𐒌 𐒆𐒖𐒇𐒖𐒒𐒗𐒀𐒗!
𐒂𐒛𐒌𐒜𐒇𐒖 𐒓𐒗𐒐𐒘𐒌𐒕𐒒𐒜 𐒔𐒜!
𐒎𐒛𐒇 𐒁𐒛 𐒎𐒖𐒁𐒇𐒘𐒌𐒖 𐒌𐒖𐒐𐒖𐒕𐒙,
𐒎𐒛𐒇 𐒁𐒛 𐒁𐒖𐒆 𐒐𐒖𐒌𐒚 𐒎𐒖𐒁𐒖𐒕𐒗,
𐒎𐒛𐒇 𐒁𐒛 𐒎𐒚𐒇𐒁𐒖𐒔𐒖 𐒆𐒗𐒌𐒖𐒕𐒙𐒀𐒙,
𐒎𐒖𐒇𐒘𐒁𐒛𐒕𐒖 𐒊𐒖𐒎𐒖𐒒𐒏𐒕𐒕𐒗𐒀𐒗!
𐒚𐒑𐒑𐒖𐒆𐒜𐒒𐒖 𐒏𐒖𐒐𐒖 𐒎𐒚𐒁𐒖𐒂𐒛,
𐒎𐒖𐒐𐒁𐒘𐒌𐒖 𐒚𐒌𐒖 𐒝𐒕𐒛𐒕𐒝𐒀𐒝,
𐒎𐒖𐒄𐒖𐒇𐒏𐒘𐒕𐒙 𐒊𐒘𐒁𐒂𐒖 𐒁𐒖𐒆𐒖𐒒 𐒁𐒛,
𐒎𐒓𐒆𐒁𐒖 𐒎𐒛𐒆𐒖𐒒 𐒓𐒛𐒕𐒜 𐒔𐒜 𐒔𐒜!
𐒈𐒝𐒑𐒛𐒐𐒘𐒕𐒗𐒕 𐒂𐒝𐒈𐒝,
𐒂𐒝𐒈𐒝 𐒘𐒈𐒏𐒚 𐒂𐒕𐒇𐒈𐒖𐒆𐒖𐒕𐒗 𐒔𐒜,
𐒔𐒖𐒆𐒁𐒖 𐒏𐒕𐒒𐒖 𐒂𐒛𐒌 𐒆𐒖𐒇𐒖𐒒𐒗𐒀𐒗!
𐒂𐒛𐒌𐒜𐒇𐒖 𐒓𐒗𐒐𐒘𐒌𐒕𐒒𐒜!
𐒈𐒘𐒆𐒖 𐒛𐒆𐒑𐒘𐒌𐒖 𐒏𐒖𐒐𐒗𐒀𐒗,
𐒛𐒕𐒖𐒔𐒖 𐒑𐒖 𐒆𐒗𐒇𐒘𐒈𐒒𐒛𐒕𐒗𐒀𐒗?
𐒑𐒘𐒈𐒗 𐒚𐒇𐒚𐒇𐒙 𐒏𐒖𐒐𐒖 𐒇𐒛𐒋𐒘𐒕𐒛!
𐒛𐒇𐒈𐒖𐒉𐒛𐒒 𐒏𐒚 𐒑𐒖𐒎𐒖𐒒𐒖𐒔𐒖𐒕𐒗𐒀𐒗?
𐒎𐒙𐒇𐒘𐒌𐒘𐒕𐒙 𐒎𐒖𐒁𐒕𐒐 𐒆𐒖𐒇𐒖𐒒 𐒁𐒛!
𐒎𐒖𐒇𐒖𐒒𐒏𐒜𐒒𐒕 𐒁𐒛𐒁𐒕𐒕𐒙𐒀𐒝!
𐒒𐒖𐒌𐒖 𐒊𐒘𐒌𐒖𐒕 𐒎𐒖𐒄𐒝𐒂𐒘 𐒁𐒖𐒄𐒝!
𐒎𐒓𐒊𐒈𐒖𐒆𐒛𐒒 𐒖𐒆𐒓𐒒𐒕𐒖𐒆𐒖𐒀𐒗!
𐒈𐒝𐒑𐒛𐒐𐒘𐒕𐒗𐒕 𐒂𐒝𐒈𐒝,
𐒂𐒝𐒈𐒝 𐒘𐒈𐒏𐒚 𐒂𐒕𐒇𐒈𐒖𐒆𐒖𐒕𐒗,
𐒔𐒖𐒆𐒁𐒖 𐒏𐒕𐒒𐒖 𐒂𐒛𐒌 𐒆𐒖𐒇𐒖𐒒𐒗𐒀𐒗!
𐒂𐒛𐒌𐒜𐒇𐒖 𐒓𐒗𐒐𐒘𐒌𐒕𐒒𐒗𐒀𐒜!
𐒋𐒖𐒐𐒖𐒒𐒏𐒜𐒒𐒖 𐒆𐒖𐒔𐒖𐒁𐒏𐒖𐒀𐒖 𐒘𐒕𐒙,
𐒋𐒕𐒆𐒜𐒒𐒖 𐒆𐒝𐒌𐒖 𐒖𐒔𐒜!
𐒘𐒒𐒖𐒌𐒛 𐒆𐒘𐒇𐒘𐒇 𐒏𐒚 𐒛𐒈𐒗𐒕𐒒𐒝,
𐒘𐒈 𐒆𐒘𐒐𐒒𐒛 𐒑𐒖 𐒆𐒙𐒓𐒁𐒛𐒀𐒜?
𐒑𐒛𐒐𐒘𐒒𐒂𐒛𐒒 𐒏𐒚𐒇𐒁𐒖𐒆𐒖 𐒁𐒘𐒀𐒘𐒒𐒜,
𐒌𐒙𐒁𐒙𐒒𐒘𐒑𐒙 𐒏𐒙𐒓 𐒒𐒘𐒊𐒘𐒕𐒗𐒀𐒗,
𐒏𐒙𐒒𐒂𐒙𐒒 𐒈𐒖𐒒𐒜 𐒏𐒚 𐒁𐒓𐒄𐒆𐒛𐒕𐒝,
𐒑𐒖𐒒𐒖 𐒔𐒖𐒊𐒘𐒒 𐒔𐒖𐒇𐒛𐒆𐒏𐒕𐒕𐒗!
𐒈𐒝𐒑𐒛𐒐𐒘𐒕𐒗𐒕 𐒂𐒝𐒈𐒝,
𐒂𐒝𐒈𐒝 𐒘𐒈𐒏𐒚 𐒂𐒕𐒇𐒈𐒖𐒆𐒖𐒕𐒗,
𐒔𐒖𐒆𐒁𐒖 𐒏𐒕𐒒𐒖 𐒂𐒛𐒌 𐒆𐒖𐒇𐒖𐒒𐒗𐒀𐒗!
𐒂𐒛𐒌𐒜𐒇𐒖 𐒓𐒗𐒐𐒘𐒌𐒕𐒒𐒗𐒀𐒜!
𐒁𐒖𐒐 𐒔𐒖𐒆𐒛𐒕𐒒𐒛𐒒 𐒘𐒈 𐒆𐒖𐒁𐒖 𐒎𐒖𐒁𐒖𐒒𐒘𐒒,
𐒓𐒛𐒒 𐒆𐒖𐒁𐒖𐒇 𐒌𐒙𐒀𐒖𐒕𐒒𐒛𐒕𐒝,
𐒚𐒑𐒑𐒖𐒆𐒆𐒝 𐒉𐒘𐒉𐒜𐒕𐒛 𐒁𐒛!
𐒋𐒖𐒇𐒘𐒌𐒜𐒒𐒖 𐒈𐒝 𐒆𐒖𐒌𐒖𐒕𐒗𐒀𐒜!
𐒋𐒖𐒐𐒖𐒒𐒕𐒖𐒔𐒙𐒓 𐒂𐒘𐒐𐒑𐒛𐒑 𐒓𐒖𐒋𐒖𐒒 𐒁𐒛,
𐒑𐒘𐒆𐒖𐒁𐒏𐒛𐒌𐒚 𐒂𐒛𐒑 𐒏𐒚 𐒕𐒖𐒔𐒝,
𐒄𐒘𐒆𐒘𐒌𐒂𐒕 𐒒𐒖 𐒂𐒘𐒇𐒘𐒒𐒖𐒕𐒈𐒛,
𐒊𐒗𐒄𐒆𐒖 𐒏𐒛𐒌𐒖 𐒈𐒕 𐒂𐒛𐒐𐒖𐒀𐒗!
𐒈𐒝𐒑𐒛𐒐𐒘𐒕𐒗𐒕 𐒂𐒝𐒈𐒝,
𐒂𐒝𐒈𐒝 𐒘𐒈𐒏𐒚 𐒂𐒕𐒇𐒈𐒖𐒆𐒖𐒕𐒗,
𐒔𐒖𐒆𐒁𐒖 𐒏𐒕𐒒𐒖 𐒂𐒛𐒌 𐒆𐒖𐒇𐒖𐒒𐒗𐒀𐒗!
𐒂𐒛𐒌𐒜𐒇𐒖 𐒓𐒗𐒐𐒘𐒌𐒕𐒒𐒗𐒀𐒜!
𐒆𐒖𐒆 𐒓𐒖𐒐𐒛𐒐𐒖 𐒛𐒒𐒚 𐒒𐒖𐒔𐒖𐒕𐒙!
𐒓𐒛 𐒐𐒖𐒕𐒈𐒏𐒚 𐒏𐒜𐒒 𐒆𐒘𐒇𐒖𐒕𐒗𐒀𐒗!
𐒒𐒖𐒋𐒖𐒁𐒏𐒜𐒒𐒕 𐒘𐒒𐒝 𐒆𐒖𐒇𐒖𐒒 𐒁𐒛!
𐒆𐒖𐒁𐒘𐒒𐒖 𐒘𐒒𐒖𐒌𐒖𐒀𐒙 𐒊𐒘𐒌𐒖𐒕𐒗𐒀𐒗!
𐒘𐒒𐒖 𐒊𐒛𐒍 𐒖𐒈𐒛𐒌𐒗𐒕𐒒𐒝!
𐒘𐒒𐒖𐒐𐒖 𐒆𐒗𐒌𐒖𐒒 𐒖𐒆𐒆𐒓𐒒𐒕𐒖𐒆𐒚𐒀𐒗,
𐒊𐒘𐒑𐒖𐒉𐒘𐒕𐒙 𐒑𐒘𐒆 𐒓𐒒 𐒒𐒙𐒐𐒙𐒐𐒜𐒆!
𐒊𐒖𐒒 𐒓𐒒 𐒑𐒖 𐒘𐒈𐒏𐒚 𐒇𐒛𐒋𐒒𐒛𐒕𐒗𐒀𐒗!
𐒈𐒝𐒑𐒛𐒐𐒘𐒕𐒗𐒕 𐒂𐒝𐒈𐒝,
𐒂𐒝𐒈𐒝 𐒘𐒈𐒏𐒚 𐒂𐒕𐒇𐒈𐒖𐒆𐒖𐒕𐒗,
𐒔𐒖𐒆𐒁𐒖 𐒏𐒕𐒒𐒖 𐒂𐒛𐒌 𐒆𐒖𐒇𐒖𐒒𐒗𐒀𐒗!
𐒂𐒛𐒌𐒜𐒇𐒖 𐒓𐒗𐒐𐒘𐒌𐒕𐒒𐒗𐒀𐒜!
𐒓𐒖𐒄𐒖 𐒛𐒒 𐒐𐒖 𐒝𐒕𐒛𐒕𐒝!
𐒘𐒐𐒑𐒖𐒆𐒚 𐒘𐒌𐒖 𐒎𐒚𐒁𐒖𐒕𐒈𐒛!
𐒘𐒎𐒂𐒘𐒕𐒛𐒇 𐒒𐒘𐒒 𐒐𐒝 𐒆𐒕𐒆𐒝!
𐒐𐒖 𐒖𐒆𐒝𐒒𐒈𐒖𐒆𐒛𐒒 𐒖𐒔𐒖𐒕𐒗𐒀𐒗!
𐒆𐒚𐒑𐒖𐒇𐒏𐒘𐒕 𐒙𐒋𐒖𐒇𐒇𐒓𐒇𐒂𐒕 𐒁𐒛!
𐒐𐒖 𐒆𐒖𐒇𐒜𐒇𐒈𐒖𐒒𐒛𐒕𐒛𐒕𐒝!
𐒆𐒚𐒒𐒘𐒆𐒖𐒕 𐒁𐒖𐒇𐒕𐒛𐒕𐒛𐒒𐒜!
𐒑𐒖 𐒆𐒖𐒇𐒜𐒑𐒘𐒒 𐒓𐒗𐒐𐒘𐒕𐒗𐒀𐒗!
𐒈𐒝𐒑𐒛𐒐𐒘𐒕𐒗𐒕 𐒂𐒝𐒈𐒝,
𐒂𐒝𐒈𐒝 𐒘𐒈𐒏𐒚 𐒂𐒕𐒇𐒈𐒖𐒆𐒖𐒕𐒗,
𐒔𐒖𐒆𐒁𐒖 𐒏𐒕𐒒𐒖 𐒂𐒛𐒌 𐒆𐒖𐒇𐒖𐒒𐒗𐒀𐒗!
𐒂𐒛𐒌𐒜𐒇𐒖 𐒓𐒗𐒐𐒘𐒌𐒕𐒒𐒗𐒀𐒜!

Wadaad's script

سأوماليييي تأوسأو,
تأوسأو يسكو تىٓرسديي,
هدب كىٓن تاغ درني'ي!
تاغىر ويليغىٓنى هى!
قار با قبريغ غليو,
قار با بد لغو قبيي,
قار با قوربه ديغيو'و,
قريباي طقنكىٓيي'ي!
أوممدىن كل قوبتا,
قلبيغ وغ أويايأو'أو,
قحركييو طيبت بدن با,
قوٓدب قادن وايى هى هى!
سأوماليييي تأوسأو,
تأوسأو يسكو تىٓرسديي هى,
هدب كىٓن تاغ درني'ي!
تاغىر ويليغىٓنى!
سيد ادميغ كلي'ي,
ايه م ديريسنايي'ي?
ميسي ورورو كل راعييا!
ارسشان كو مقنهيي'ي?
قوريغييو قبىٓل درن با!
قرنكىنىٓ بابىٓيو'أو!
نغ طيغي قحأوتي بحأو!
قوٓطسدان دوٓنيد'ي!
سأوماليييي تأوسأو,
تأوسأو يسكو تىٓرسديي,
هدب كىٓن تاغ درني'ي!
تاغىر ويليغىٓني'ى!
علنكىن طبك' ييو,
عىٓدىن دأوغ هى!
إنغا ديرير كو اسيينأو,
إس ديلنا م دووبا'ى?
مالينتان كوربد بي'ينى,
غوبونيمو كوو نيطييي'ي,
كونتون سنى كو بوٓحدايأو,
من هطين هرادكىٓيي!
سأوماليييي تأوسأو,
تأوسأو يسكو تىٓرسديي,
هدب كىٓن تاغ درني'ي!
تاغىر ويليغىٓني'ى!
بل هداينان يس دب قبنين,
وان دبر غو'ينايأو,
أوممددأو شيشىيا با!
عريغىن سأو دغيي'ى!
علنيهوو تيلمام وعن با,
ميدبكاغو تام كو يهأو,
حيديغتىٓ ن تيرينيسا,
طيحد كاغ سىٓ تال'ي!
سأوماليييي تأوسأو,
تأوسأو يسكو تىٓرسديي,
هدب كىٓن تاغ درني'ي!
تاغىر ويليغىٓني'ى!
دد ولال انو نهيو!
وا ليسكو كىن ديريي'ي!
نعبكىنىٓ ينأو درن با!
دبين ينغ'و طيغيي'ي!
إن طاف ساغيينأو!
إنل ديغن ددوٓنيدو'ي,
طيمشييو ميد وٓن نولولىد!
طن وٓن م يسكو راعنايي'ي!
سأوماليييي تأوسأو,
تأوسأو يسكو تىٓرسديي,
هدب كىٓن تاغ درني'ي!
تاغىر ويليغىٓني'ى!
وح ان ل أويايأو!
إلمدو يغ قوبيسا!
إقتييار نين لأو دىٓدأو!
ل دأونسدان هيي'ي!
دومركيي وعرروٓرتىٓ با!
ل درىرسنايايأو!
دونيدي بريايانى!
م درىمين ويلييي'ي!
سأوماليييي تأوسأو,
تأوسأو يسكو تىٓرسديي,
هدب كىٓن تاغ درني'ي!
تاغىر ويليغىٓني'ى!

== See also ==
- History of Somalia
- Flag of Somalia
- National anthem of Somalia (1960–2000)
- Qolobaa Calankeed, the national anthem 2012–present
