= Transitional National Government of Somalia =

Government of Somalia from 2000 to 2004

Transitional National Government of the Republic of Somalia
- 2000–2004
- Flag Coat of arms
- Anthem: (2000); Heesta calanka Soomaaliya (2000–2004); Soomaaliyeey toosoo
- Capital: Mogadishu
- Common languages: Somali · Arabic · Italian
- Religion: Sunni Islam
- Government: Provisional government
- President
  - 2000–2004: Abdiqasim Salad Hassan
- History
  - Somalia National Peace Conference: 20 April 2000
  - Transitional charter: 14 October 2004
- ISO 3166 code: SO
Preceded by	Succeeded by
Interim Government of Somalia	Transitional Federal Government of Somalia

The Transitional National Government (TNG) was the internationally recognized central government of Somalia from 2000 to 2004.

== Overview ==
The TNG was established in 20 April–5 May 2000 at the Somalia National Peace Conference held in Arta, Djibouti. In principle, the Transitional National Charter, which gave rise to the TNG, recognized de facto regional autonomy and the existence of new entities in the north of the former Somalia, home to relatively homogeneous clans. In some parts of Somalia, however, decentralization meant state authority disintegrated.

Somalia's powerful neighbor, Ethiopia, immediately opposed the TNG, fearing that it would renew claims on the Ogaden region. Ethiopia supported groups in Somalia that resisted the TNG, actively sponsoring the formation of opposition alliances to preserve its strategic interests. Most notably, it sponsored the creation of a powerful warlord coalition called the Somalia Reconciliation and Restoration Council (SRRC) which was founded in Ethiopia during mid-2001. The SRRC served as the main political and military opposition to the TNG. The emergence of the TNG alarmed Puntland's ruling government, who feared that a reunified Somalia would be oriented to the south. In January 2001, Abdullahi Yusuf Ahmed requested the United Nations 'review its decision' to recognize the TNG and protested to the Arab League about support being given to the government. Yusuf also joined the Ethiopian warlord coalition in order to undermine the TNG. After the 9/11 attacks, the Ethiopian government openly accused the TNG leadership of being Islamic extremists who were pro-Bin Laden and the SRRC called on the international community to intervene in Somalia and set up a transitional government akin to Afghanistan.

Concurrent to the formation of the transitional government, the various Islamic Courts that had emerged to challenge the hegemony of Somali warlords in Mogadishu unified their militias into a single combat force in 2000. This signified the emergence of the first major non-warlord affiliated Somali armed force in the city. When the TNG was established that same year, the momentum of the Islamic Courts was slowed as they opted to support the TNG. The chairman of the Islamic Courts was elected as a member of the Transitional National Assembly. Openly threatened by warlords, the Courts protected the President Abdiqasim Salad Hassan during his return to the capital in August 2000, and soon handed over their heavy weaponry to the newly formed TNG. During 2001 the TNG gradually absorbed the Islamic courts and their militia, ceasing function by the years end.

According to Le Sage, the TNG in 2002 had all of the organs of a national government, including executive and judicial structures as well as a parliament, a police force and standing army. However, its institutions remained very weak on account of a dearth of basic office equipment, lack of territorial control, and inability to raise tax revenue. Due to these limitations, the TNG was unable to provide basic social services. Ministers and legislators also often expressed frustration at being shut out of the real decision-making process, and of often receiving irregular and limited salaries. As such, Le Sage argues that the public officials served more as symbols of the potential for a broad-based, national government. The TNG's internal problems led to the replacement of the prime minister four times in three years, and the administrative body's reported bankruptcy in December 2003. Its mandate ended at the same time.

A strong Somali state not dependent on Addis Ababa was perceived as a security threat to the Ethiopian state, and consequently the Ethiopian government heavily backed the formation of the Transitional Federal Government (TFG) in 2004 and the presidency of Abdullahi Yusuf on the grounds that he would give up Somalia's long standing claim to the Ogaden. According to academics Ashley Elliot and Georg-Sebastian Holzer, "Ethiopia’s success in undermining the nascent interim government proved that Addis Ababa effectively exercised the power of veto over the political direction of its disorderly neighbour."

On October 10, 2004, legislators elected Abdullahi Yusuf Ahmed as the first president of the transitional federal government (TFG), the TNG's successor. He received 189 votes from the TFG Parliament, while the closest contender, erstwhile Somali ambassador to Washington Abdullahi Ahmed Addou, got 79 votes in the third round of voting. The then incumbent President of Somalia, TNG leader Abdiqasim Salad Hassan, peacefully withdrew his candidature.

== History ==
=== 2000 ===
- Somalia National Peace Conference (SNPC) or Djibouti Conference, held in Arta, Djibouti, on April 20 – May 5, 2000. The name Transitional National Government (TNG) was selected for the initiative at this time.
- Election of Abdiqasim Salad Hassan as president by clan representatives

=== 2001 ===
- National Commission for Reconciliation and Property Settlement

=== 2002 ===
- 2002 Somali Reconciliation Conference held in Eldoret, Kenya
- Appointment of General Ismail Qasim Naji as the leader of the army in January 2002. The army in March 2002 numbered 2,010 men and 90 women.
- Mutinies in early 2002.

== Leaders and members ==
- Abdiqasim Salad Hassan – President
- Gen. Ismail Qasim Naji – Army commander (Somali Armed Forces)
- Ali Khalif Galaydh – 1st Prime Minister, October 8, 2000 – October 28, 2001
- Osman Jama Ali – 2nd Prime Minister, briefly held post October 28 – November 12, 2002
- Hassan Abshir Farah – 3rd Prime Minister, 12 November 2002 – December 8, 2003
- Mohamed Abdi Yusuf – 4th Prime Minister, December 31, 2003 – November 3, 2004
- Ali Mahdi Muhammad – MP in the TNG
- Rasack Yousuf – MP in the TNG
- Abdirahman Omar – MP in the TNG
- Mahamed Saeed – MP in the TNG
- Sheikh Ibrahim – MP in the TNG
