= Flag of Galmudug =

Regional state flag in Somalia

Galmudug
- Proportion: 5:3
- Adopted: 17 June 2015
- Design: White triangle bearing two green stars facing horizontally on a light blue field bearing a large white star on the fly.

The current flag of Galmudug was adopted on 17 June 2015.

Initially, it flew the Somali flag, but sometimes above the star a white inscription “State Somaliyya” was added. The second flag used was white with the arms in center. These arms were the Somali national arms between laurel branches, and below a blue ribbon with the white letters GMS. The third flag was light blue with green triangle at the hoist, fimbriated in white, bearing within a white crescent and star.

On this was changed the flag to a new design which comprises horizontal stripes of yellow, blue, and green. In the blue central stripe is a white five pointed star.

== Gallery ==
One of flag version of Galmudug (14 August 2006 – 3 February 2009)

Galmudug also used the flag of Somalia between 2006 and 2009

Flag of Galmudug (3 February 2009 – 8 July 2010)

Flag of Galmudug (8 July 2010 – 17 June 2015)
