= Independence Day (State of Somaliland) =

Annual holiday and celebration of liberation in the State of Somaliland

- Flag of the State of Somaliland
- Observed by: Somaliland
- Significance: Establishment of the State of Somaliland
- Date: 26 June
- Next time: 26 June 2026
- Frequency: annual

Independence Day of Somaliland is an annual celebration and a public holiday in Somaliland and neighbouring Somalia that commemorates the proclamation of independence of the short-lived independent State of Somaliland on 26 June 1960.

In the late 19th century, the territories of what is now Somalia and Somaliland were divided between Britain and Italy. During the Second World War, British Somaliland was invaded by Italian troops, but the British eventually regained control of it. After the war, British Somaliland remained a British protectorate, but it was decided that British Somaliland and the Trust Territory of Somaliland (formerly Italian Somaliland) would be united as a single independent state after a prolonged transition period.

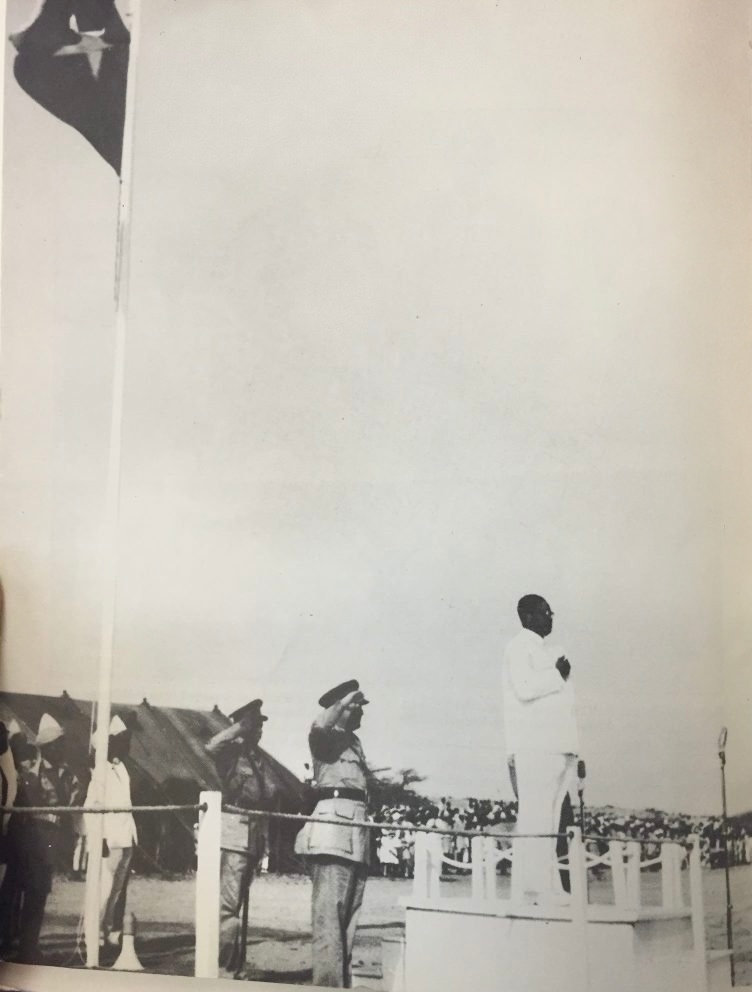
Somaliland Flying for the first time: The White and Blue Somali Flag at the Independence Celebrations on 26 June 1960 Prime Minister of the State of Somaliland and second president of Somaliland Muhammad Haji Ibrahim Egal salutes the flag.

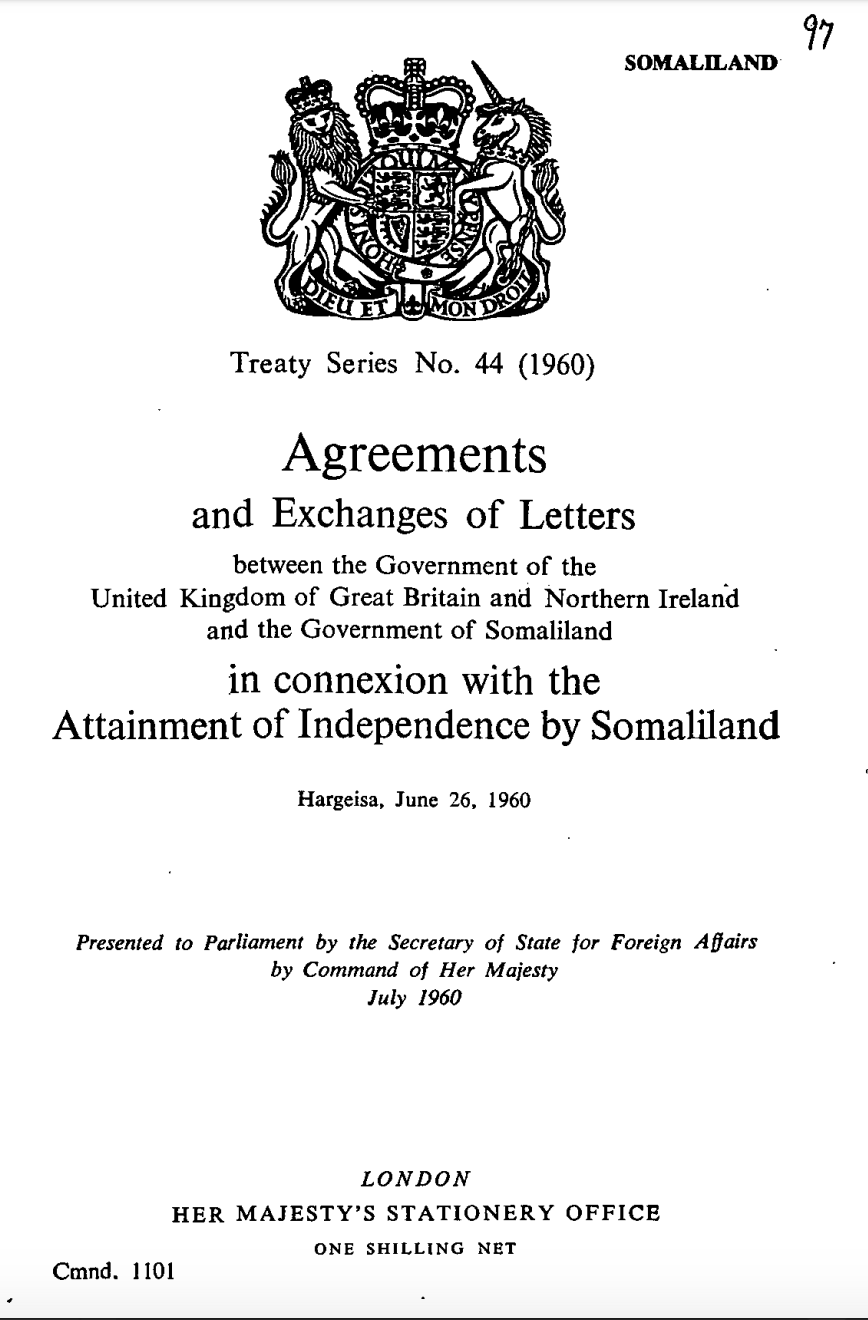
Agreements and Exchanges of Letters between the Government of the United Kingdom of Great Britain and Northern Ireland and the Government of Somaliland in connexion with the Attainment of Independence by Somaliland

On 26 June 1960, British Somaliland gained independence as the State of Somaliland. On 1 July, the country united with the former Italian Somaliland to become the Somali Republic. The anniversaries of both events are now celebrated as public holidays in Somaliland and Somalia.

On 18 May 1991, a revived Republic of Somaliland "reaffirmed" sovereignty over State of Somaliland from the Somali Democratic Republic. Since 1991, Somaliland has been a self-declared sovereign state that is recognised as an autonomous independent region of Somalia by the international community. Its government regards its territory as the successor state to the State of Somaliland, and seeks full international recognition as the Republic of Somaliland.
