= Dhobley (Gedo Region) =

Dhobley Liboya Somali
- Town
- Location in Somalia.
- Coordinates: 2°30′0″N 42°19′46″E
- Country: Somalia
- Region: Gedo

Government
  - Type: Federal parliamentary republic
- Time zone: UTC+3 (EAT)

Dhobley is a town in Afmadow District, Lower Juba, Somalia in Jubaland State.
