= Flag of the South West State =

Koonfur Galbeed
- Proportion: 5:3
- Adopted: 2014
- Design: The blue background and star of Somalia's flag in the upper hoist, a red diagonal band through the middle, and a green background with a ring of six stars in the lower fly.
- Designed by: Mohamed Issack Abdi

The current flag of Koofur Orsi or Koonfur Galbeed state was adopted in 2014. The first flag of South West State of Somalia was adopted in April 2002.

== History ==
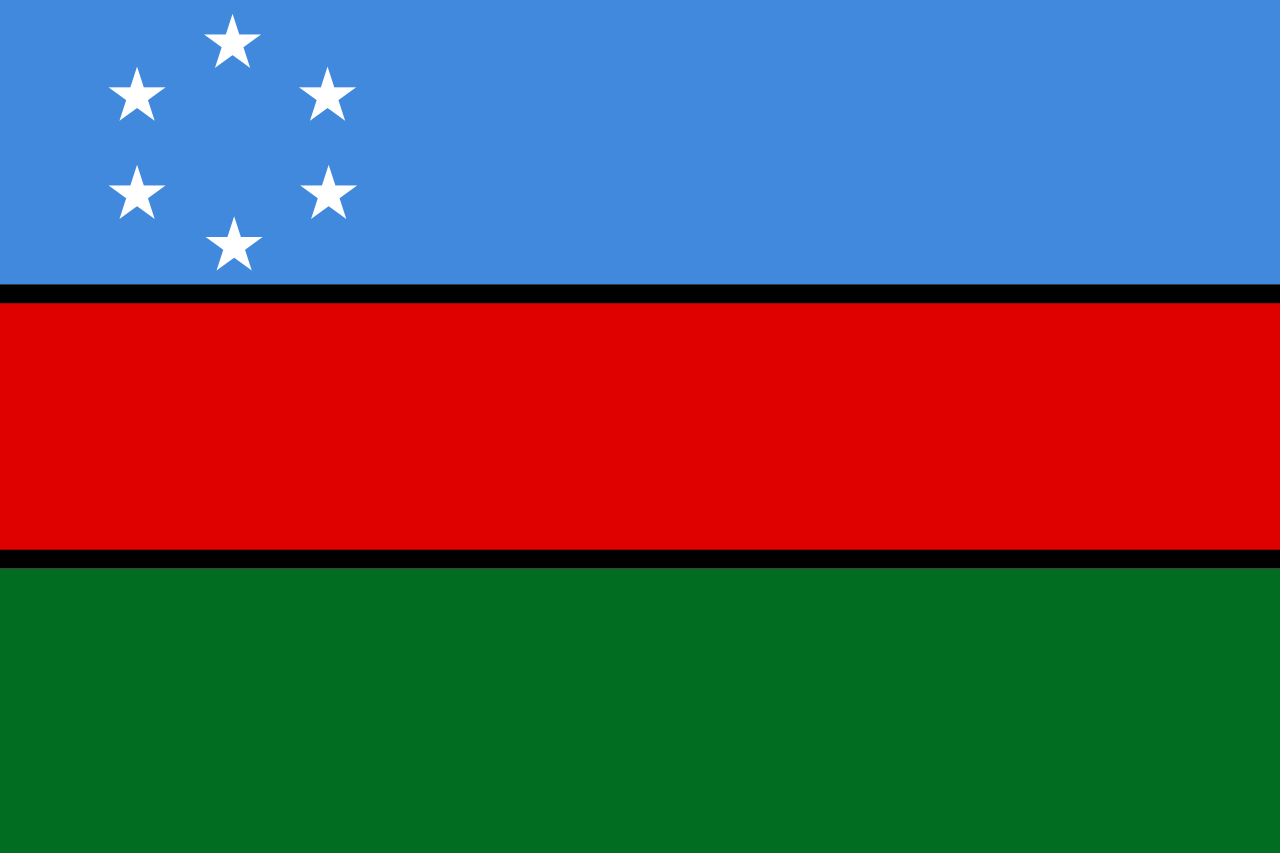
Flag in use from 2002 to 2014

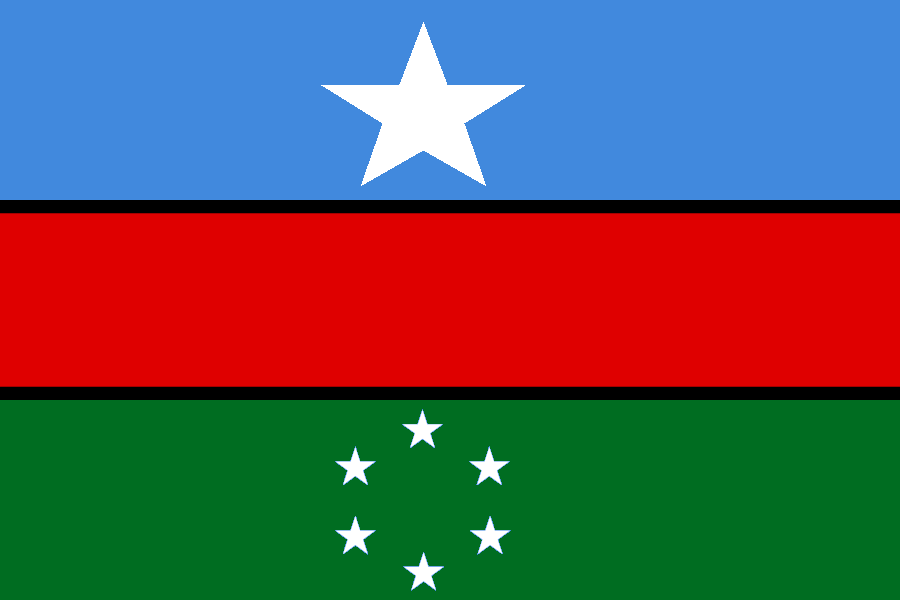
Flag in use for a few months in 2014
