= Flag of Puntland =

Puntland
- Use: Civil and state flag
- Proportion: 2:3
- Adopted: 22 December 2009; 16 years ago
- Design: A horizontal tricolor of blue, white and green with a white star at the top.

The state flag of Puntland, an autonomous state in northeastern Somalia, was adopted on 22 December 2009.

== History ==
Following the creation of Puntland in 1998, the autonomous state initially used a variation of the flag of Somalia as its provincial flag. The constitution of Puntland called for the autonomous state to have its own flag and anthem, as part of Somalia. As a result, a new flag and anthem were proposed.

On 22 December 2009, the House of Representatives of Puntland introduced a new state flag. It was the first time in the autonomous state's 11-year history that it had adopted distinctive state symbols. The flag design was decided on by a commission consisting of government officials and local intellectuals which included Dr. Jima'ale, the Minister of Constitution and Federal Affairs of Puntland.

An anthem proposed at the same time as the new flag was not adopted by the House of Representatives of Puntland.

The autonomous state also had an emblem designed at the same time as the flag. This consists of a shield in the colours of the Puntland flag. Occupying the centre white section is a dhiil which is a traditional milk storage container. This is used to symbolise peace and milk. The top portion of the shield is gold-edged. On either side of the shield is a horse on its hind legs standing on a spear. There are two leaves in the centre and a gold-colored cloth hanging from the spear which has Puntland written on it.

== Colors and symbolization ==
The Puntland flag consists of three colours: white, blue and green. The blue stripe with the white star in the centre at the top of the flag symbolises the flag of Somalia, the white stripe in the centre of the flag represents peace and stability in the region and the green stripe at the bottom of the flag symbolises the natural wealth of the Puntland State of Somalia.

== Different flags ==
Flag of Puntland used prior to December 2009 (the same as the Flag of Somalia)

The Coat of arms of Puntland

Flag attributed to West Puntland, a semi-autonomous area in Galkayo District previously known as Tanadland
