= State of Somaliland =

1960 short-lived state in the Horn of Africa

State of Somaliland Qaranka Soomaaliland (Somali) دولة صوماليلاند (Arabic) Ṣūmālīlānd
- 1960
- Flag
- Anthem: National anthem of Somaliland
- Location of Somaliland
- Status: Sovereign; Independent state
- Capital: Hargeisa
- Common languages: Somali; English
- Religion: Sunni Islam
- Demonym: Somali
- Government: Unitary parliamentary republic
  - Prime Minister: Muhammad Haji Ibrahim Egal
- Legislature: Legislative Assembly
- History
  - Independence from the United Kingdom: 26 June 1960
  - Unification with the Trust Territory of Somaliland to form the Somali Republic: 1 July 1960

Area
  - Total: 176,120 km^{2} (68,000 sq mi) (69th)

Population
  - 1960 estimate: 650,000
- Currency: East African shilling
Preceded by	Succeeded by
British Somaliland	Somali Republic
- Today part of: Somalia; Somaliland

Somaliland, officially known as the State of Somaliland (Somali: Qaranka Soomaaliland), was a sovereign and independent country that existed for five days in 1960. It gained independence from the United Kingdom on 26 June 1960 and on 1 July 1960, together with the Trust Territory of Somaliland which gained independence from Italy and ended its UN trusteeship under Italian administration on the same day, they formed the Somali Republic.

== History ==
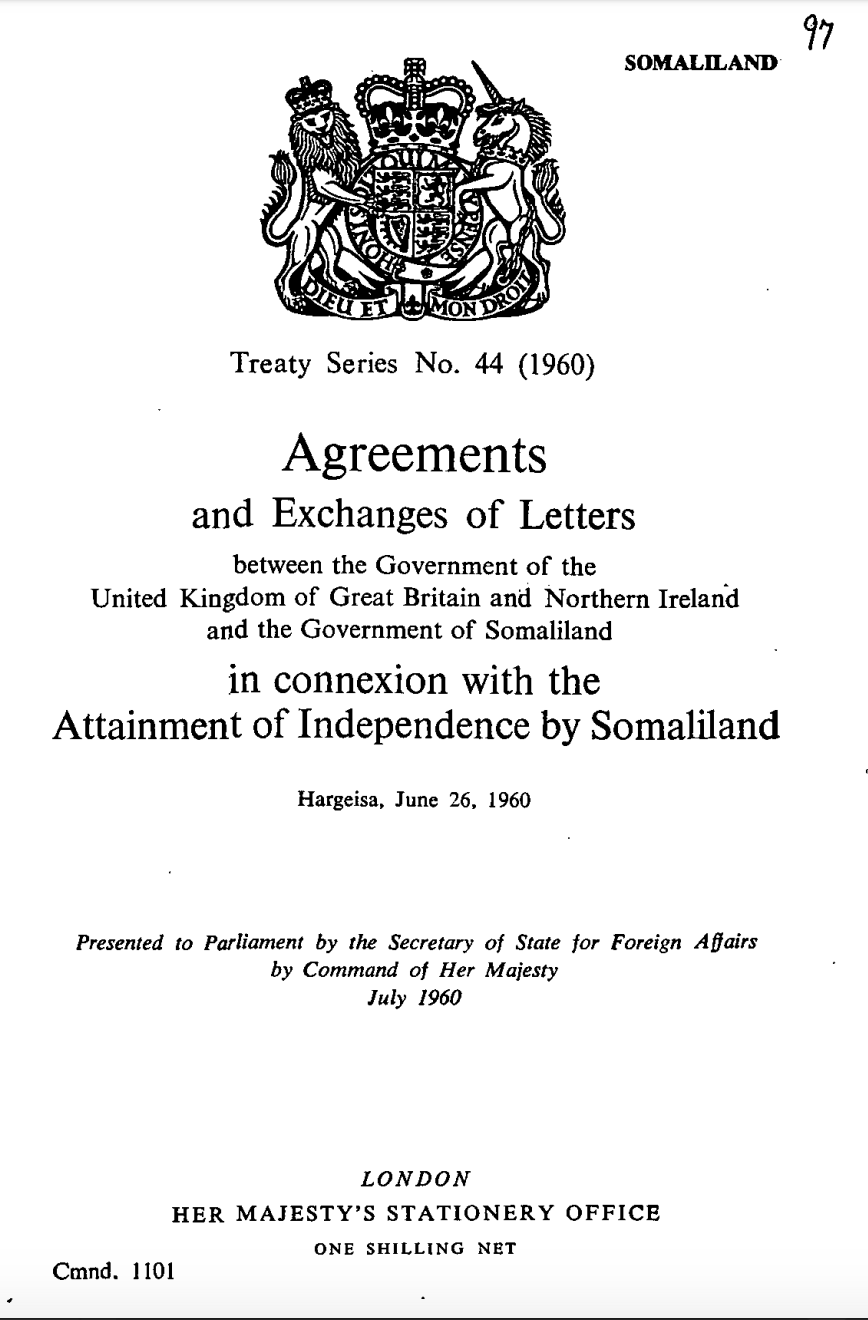
Agreements and Exchanges of Letters between the Government of the United Kingdom and the Government of Somaliland in connexion with the Attainment of Independence by Somaliland

Initially the British government planned to delay the protectorate of British Somaliland independence in favour of a gradual transfer of power. The arrangement would allow local politicians to gain more political experience in running the protectorate before official independence. However, strong pan-Somali nationalism and a landslide victory in the earlier elections encouraged them to demand independence and unification with the Trust Territory of Somaliland under Italian Administration.

The British stated that it would be prepared to grant independence to the then protectorate of British Somaliland, with the intention that the territory would unite with the Trust Territory of Somaliland. The Legislative Council of British Somaliland passed a resolution in April 1960 requesting independence and union with the Trust Territory of Somaliland, which was scheduled to gain independence on 1 July that year. The legislative councils of both territories agreed to this proposal following a joint conference in Mogadishu.

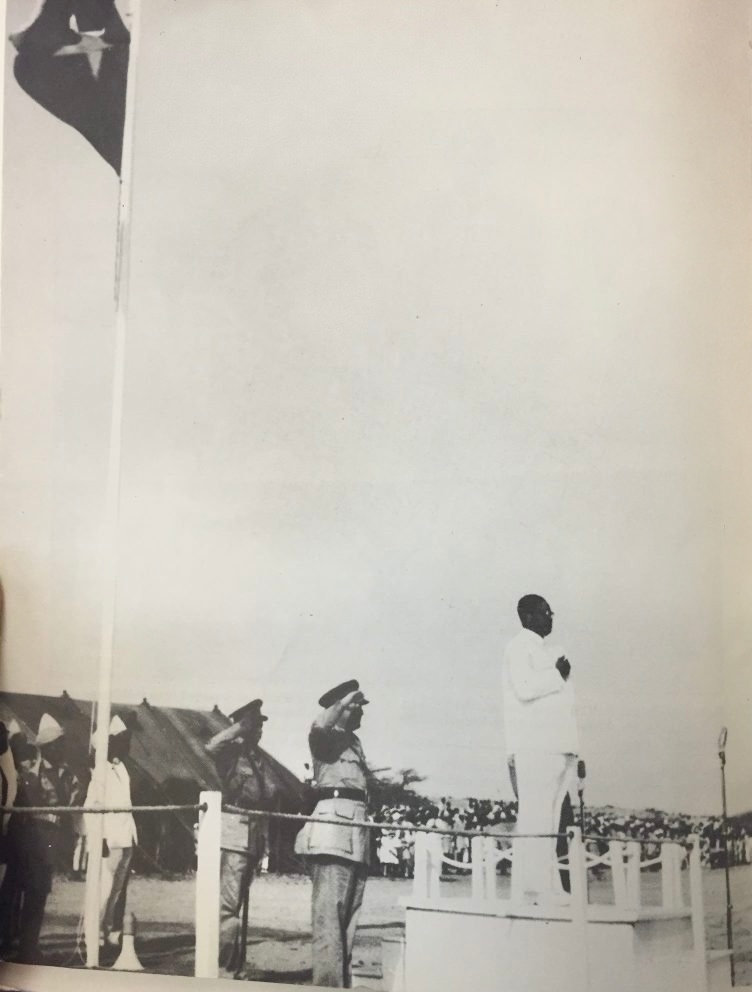
Somaliland flying the Somali Flag at the Independence ceremony on 26 June 1960. The then Prime Minister of the State of Somaliland Muhammad Haji Ibrahim Egal salutes the flag.

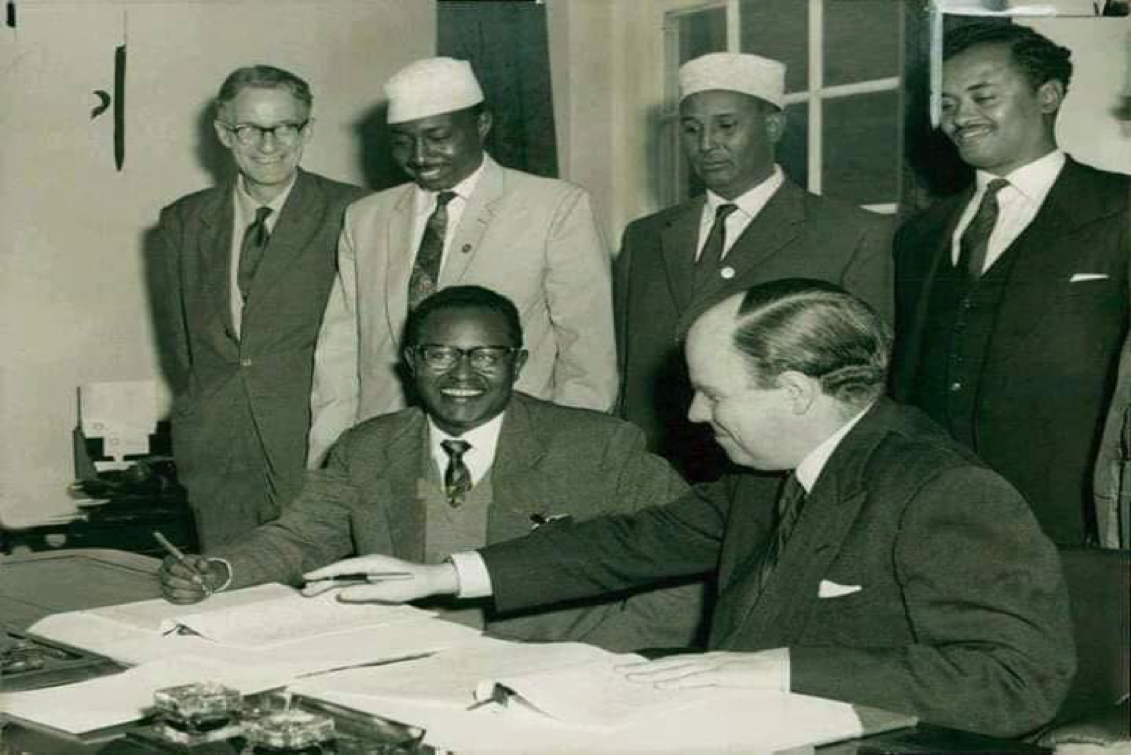
The Somaliland Protectorate Constitutional Conference, London, May 1960 in which it was decide that 26 June be the day of Independence, and so signed on 12 May 1960. Somaliland Delegation: Mohamed Haji Ibrahim Egal, Ahmed Haji Dualeh, Ali Garad Jama& Haji Ibrahim Nur. From the Colonial Office: Ian Macleod, D. B. Hall, H. C. F. Wilks (Secretary)

Muhammad Haji Ibrahim Egal, who had previously served as an unofficial member of the former British Somaliland protectorate's Executive Council and the leader of Government Business in the Legislative Council, became the prime minister of Somaliland.

On 26 June 1960, the former British Somaliland protectorate obtained independence as Somaliland. The following day, on 27 June 1960, the newly convened Somaliland Legislative Assembly passed a bill that would formally allow for the union of Somaliland with the Trust Territory of Somaliland, which was set for independence on 1 July 1960.

There were also fears of clashes with populations in Ethiopia.

Following unification on 1 July 1960, a government was formed by Abdullahi Issa, with Abdulcadir Muhammed Aden as President of the Somali National Assembly, Aden Abdullah Osman Daar as President and Abdirashid Ali Shermarke as Prime Minister, later to become President (from 1967 to 1969). On 20 July 1961, and through a popular referendum, the Somali people ratified a new constitution, which was first drafted in 1960. The constitution was widely regarded as unfair in the former Somaliland, however, and over 60% of the northern voters were against it in the referendum. Regardless, it was signed into law. Widespread dissatisfaction spread among the north's population, and British-trained officers attempted a revolt to end the union in December 1961. Their uprising failed, and Somaliland continued to be marginalized by the south during the next decades.

== Diplomatic recognition ==
During its existence, Somaliland received international recognition from 33 countries, that included the United Kingdom, the United States, China, Egypt, Ethiopia, France, Ghana, Israel, Libya and the Soviet Union.

Queen Elizabeth II sent the following message to the people of Somaliland to mark independence day:

"I, my Government and my people in the United Kingdom, wish you well on this day of independence. The connection between our people goes back some 130 years and British administration of the Protectorate for 60 years. I look forward to a continuing and enduring friendship between our two countries."

The United States Secretary of State Christian Herter sent a congratulatory message, and the United Kingdom signed several bilateral agreements with Somaliland in Hargeisa on June 26, 1960.

United States Secretary of State Christian Herter sent the following letter:

June 26, 1960
Their Excellencies,

Council of Ministers of Somaliland, Hargeisa.

Your Excellencies: I extend my best wishes and congratulations on the achievement of your independence. This is a noteworthy milestone in your history, and it is with pleasure that I send

my warmest regards on this happy occasion.

Christian A. Herter

Secretary of State, United States of America.

== Governance ==
=== Constitution of Somaliland ===
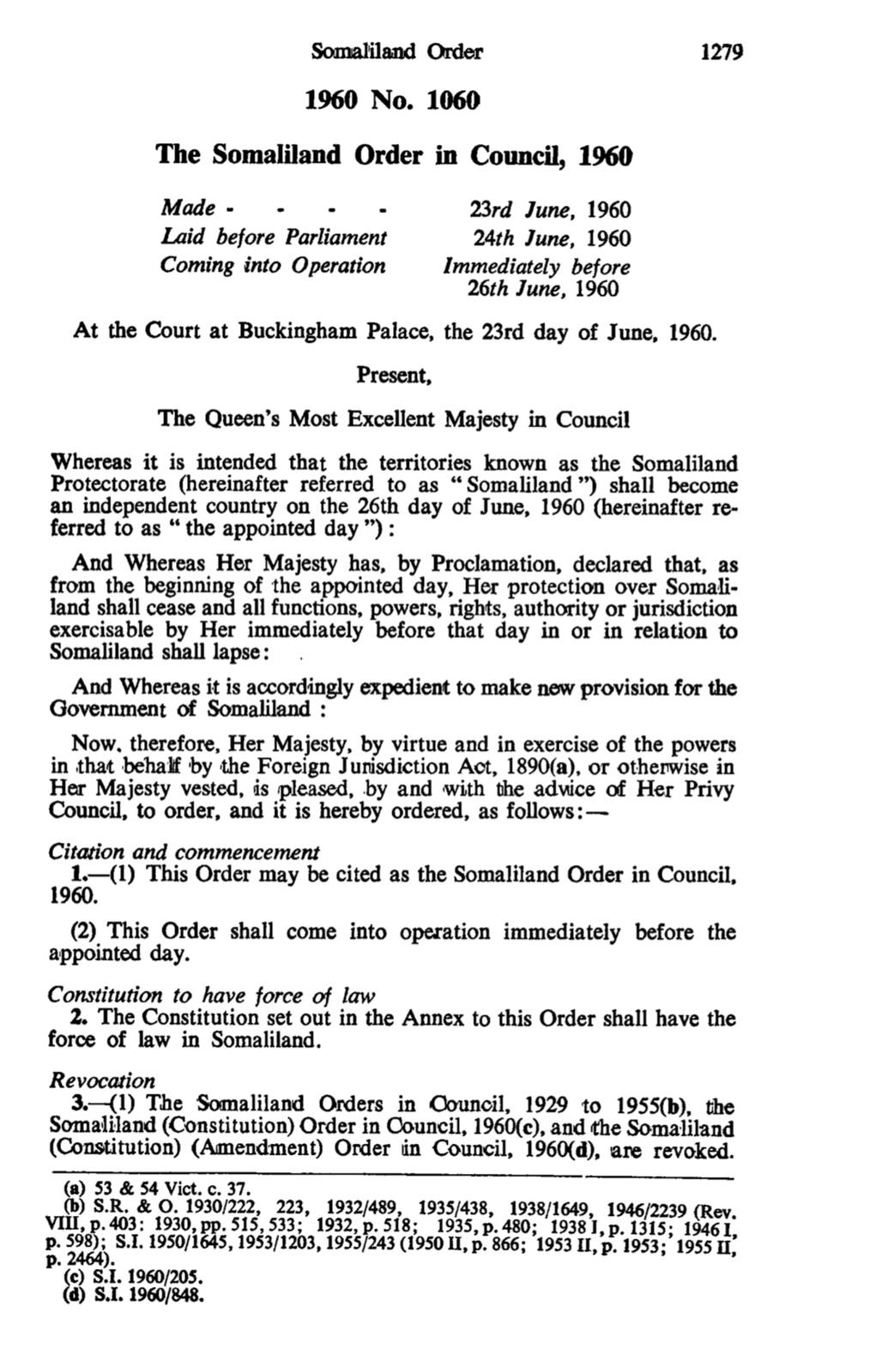
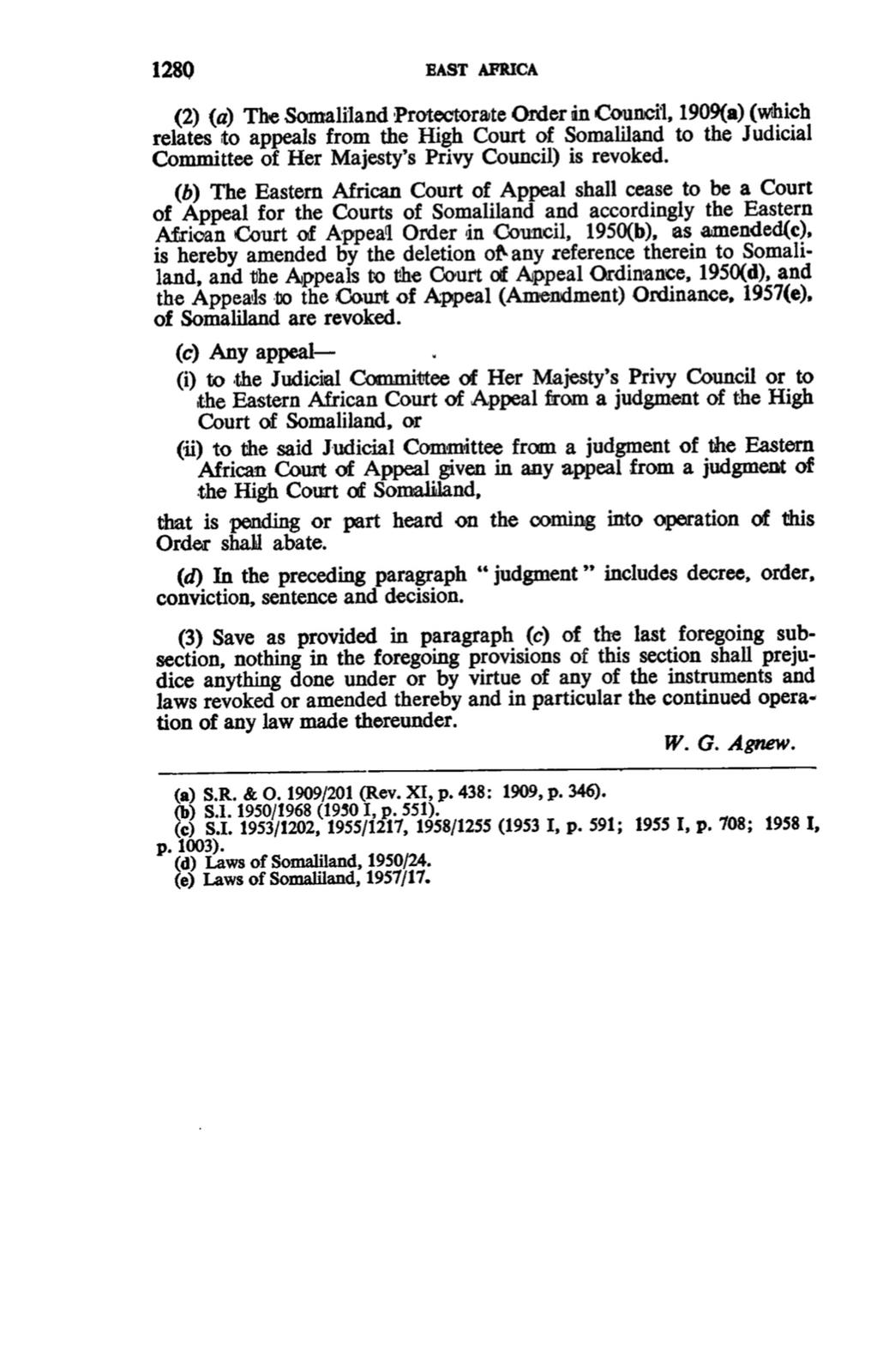
Somaliland Order in Council (S.I. No. 1060 of 1960)

The system of governance for Somaliland was established by the Constitution of Somaliland which was enacted by the Somaliland Order in Council 1960 (SI 1960/1060) made by Queen Elizabeth II of the United Kingdom on 23 June 1960.

The Order in Council explicitly stated that "Somaliland shall become an independent country on the 26 day of June, 1960" and that British protection over Somaliland would lapse on the same date. The introduction to the constitution defined Somaliland's territory as being all the territory of the British Somaliland Protectorate.

The constitution established three branches of government following the Westminster system:

- The Council of Ministers which was led by the Prime Minister and included four other ministers.
- The Legislative Assembly which had 33 members and was presided over by a Speaker.
- The High Court which was made up of a number of Judges determined by the Council of Ministers.

=== Prime Minister of Somaliland ===
Muhammad Haji Ibrahim Egal was the first and only holder of the office.

No.	Portrait	Name (Birth–Death)	Election	Term of office		
No.	Portrait	Name (Birth–Death)	Election	Took office	Left office	Time in office
1		Muhammad Haji Ibrahim Egal (1928 – 2002)	1960	26 June 1960	1 July 1960	5 days

=== Somaliland Council of Ministers ===
The Council of Ministers had five members:

Name	Designation
Mohamed Ibrahim Egal	Prime Minister
Garad Ali Garad Jama	Minister
Ahmed Haji Dualeh	Minister
Hajji Yusuf Iman	Minister
Hajji Ibrahim Nur	Minister

=== Somaliland Legislative Assembly ===
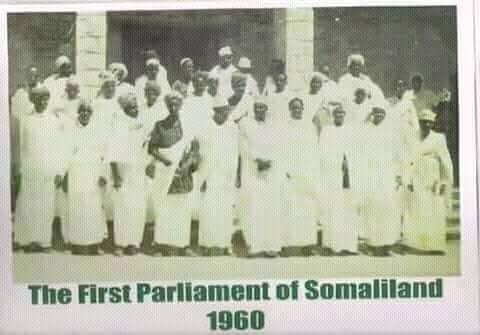
Members of the Legislative Assembly elected in February 1960

The Somaliland Legislative Assembly had 33 members (MLAs), including an ex-officio Speaker. Members of the legislative assembly were elected in February 1960 from 33 single-member constituencies.

Party	MLAs
Somali National League	20
National United Front	1
United Somali Party	12
Speaker	1
Total	34

== Use as a legal precedent for the Republic of Somaliland ==
Today's re-established Republic of Somaliland functions as a de facto independent state and regards itself as the legal successor to the State of Somaliland. However, unlike the former State of Somaliland, it has not gained widespread diplomatic recognition as a country, instead being treated as an autonomous region within Somalia. As of 26 December 2025, Israel is the only United Nations member state that recognises the Republic of Somaliland as an independent sovereign state.
