= 1960 British Somaliland parliamentary election =

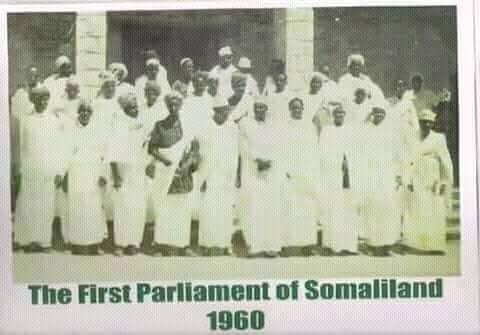
The first Parliament of Somaliland in 1960

Parliamentary elections were held in British Somaliland on 17 February 1960. The result was a victory for the Somali National League (SNL), which won 20 of the 33 seats in the Legislative Council.

== Background ==
Although a Legislative Council had been elected in 1959, a new constitution led to the Council having an elected majority; 33 elected seats and three government officials.

== Electoral system ==
The 33 elected members of the Council were elected in single-member constituencies by first-past-the-post voting.

== Results ==
Party	Votes	%	Seats	+/–
Somali National League	42,395	52.10	20	New
National United Front	20,249	24.89	1	−6
United Somali Party	13,350	16.41	12	New
Somali Youth League	4,626	5.69	0	New
Other parties	746	0.92	0	−
Total	81,366	100.00	33	+21
Source: Nohlen et al.
