= Flag of Azania =

Azania
- Use: Civil and state flag
- Proportion: 2:3
- Adopted: 3 April 2011
- Design: A horizontal tricolor of white, blue and red.

The flag of Azania was the state flag of Azania, an autonomous region in southwestern Somalia. The flag of Azania was similar to the one that previously existed in Russia from 1991 to 1993. It differed only in the aspect ratio, 2:3 instead of 1:2.

== History ==
There is no accurate and reliable information confirming which previous flag Azania had. However, it is known that on 13 March 2011, even before the official declaration of independence of state entity, the flag of Azania was established, completely identical to the current flag of Russia, in the center of which there is an elephant (it existed until 25 March when the elephant emblem was removed). There is also alleged information that the previous flag of Azania consisted of horizontal blue, red and green stripes and was similar to the flag of Azerbaijan. It is a combination of the colors of the South West State of Somalia, although there is no reliable information in primary sources about the variants of this original flag (hinting at the intention to lead not three, but six provinces, including South West State).

== Colors ==
The Azania flag consists of three colors: white, blue and red.
