= Ethiopian–Somali conflict =

Territorial and political dispute

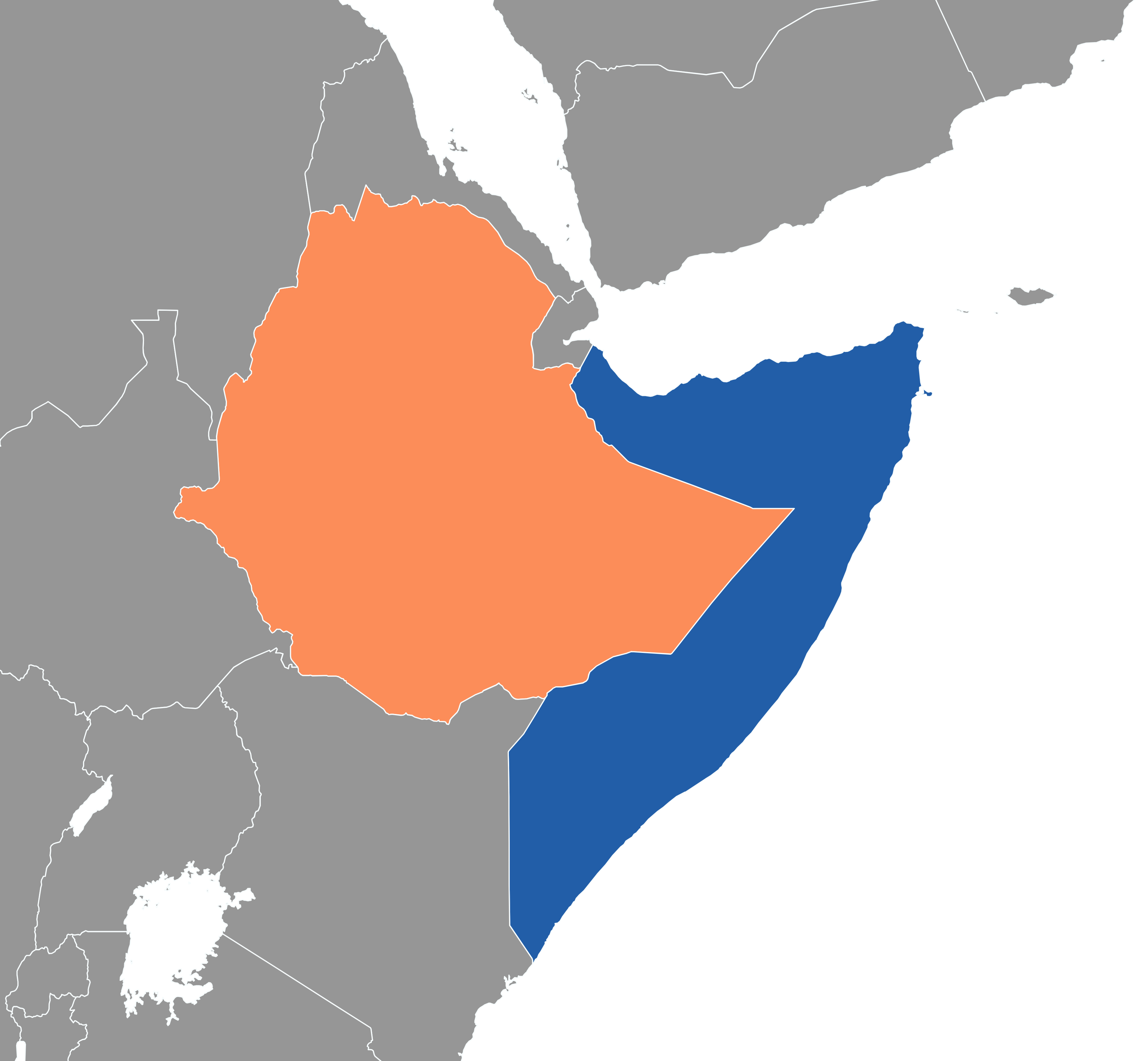
- Ethiopia (orange) and Somalia (blue)
Date	1328 – present
Location	Horn of Africa
Status	Ongoing

Belligerents
Ethiopia	Somalia

Casualties and losses
Unknown	Unknown

The Ethiopian–Somali conflict is a territorial and political dispute between Ethiopia, Somalia, and insurgents in the area.

Originating in the 1300s, the present conflict stems from the Ethiopian Empire's expansions into the Somali-inhabited Ogaden region during the late 19th century. It escalated further when the Ogaden and Haud territories were transferred to Ethiopia by Britain after World War II. In the decades following, Somali desires for self-determination and/or unification under a Greater Somalia have culminated in numerous insurgencies and several wars. However, because of the Somali Civil War and the lack of a functioning central government since the collapse of the Democratic Republic of Somalia in 1991, Ethiopia has the upper hand militarily and economically.

== Background ==
In the 14th and 15th centuries, the Christian rulers of Abyssinia in the Ethiopian highlands became increasingly interested in proselytizing the coastal lands where Islam flourished, particularly in what is now northern Somalia, which was populated by Muslim Somali and other ethnic groups. This interest was particularly focused on what is now northern Somalia, with the goal of achieving sea access. The Ethiopian Empire sought to control the trades routes from ports such as Zeila.

Both religious and economic motives were the impetus for Abyssinian incursions in the regions, as the rapid spread of Islam along the vital Zeila trade route was viewed as an existential threat to its existence. Abyssinian military expeditions were dispatched southeastward from the highlands over the decades to achieve these goals, ultimately serving as a significant unifying force among the Somali and other Muslim nationalities.

Before the Abyssinian attack on the Sultanate of Ifat, which was then controlling the Zeila trade route, Muslims and Christians in the horn had largely coexisted peacefully since the spread of Islam to the region, as the Muslims had a deep respect for Najashi, the Abyssinian ruler of the Kingdom of Axum, who had sheltered some of the earliest companions of the Prophet from persecution. The Ethiopian–Somali conflict effectively began in 1328 when the Abyssinians under Amda Seyon invaded Ifat. While the Muslim coalitions had initial successes, internal conflict resulted in their defeat. During the reign of Amda Seyon's son, Sayfa Arad, the Muslims began coalescing behind the Adal Sultanate and launching counter offensives.

=== 1500s ===
During the 16th century, as the number and scale of Abyssinian raiding parties grew, Somali territories experienced increasing plunder and destruction. According to Prof. Richard Greenfield, "Eventually, the harassed Somali people retaliated." In 1529, in response to escalating Ethiopian raids on the Adalite frontier during a succession crisis, the leader of Adal, Imam Ahmad ibn Ibrahim al-Ghazi (also known as Ahmad Gurey or Gragn), launched a campaign to eliminate Abyssinian rule over all Muslim lands and neutralize the Abyssinian threat by bringing these territories under Muslim control. This marked a strategic shift from a primarily defensive stance to an offensive approach.

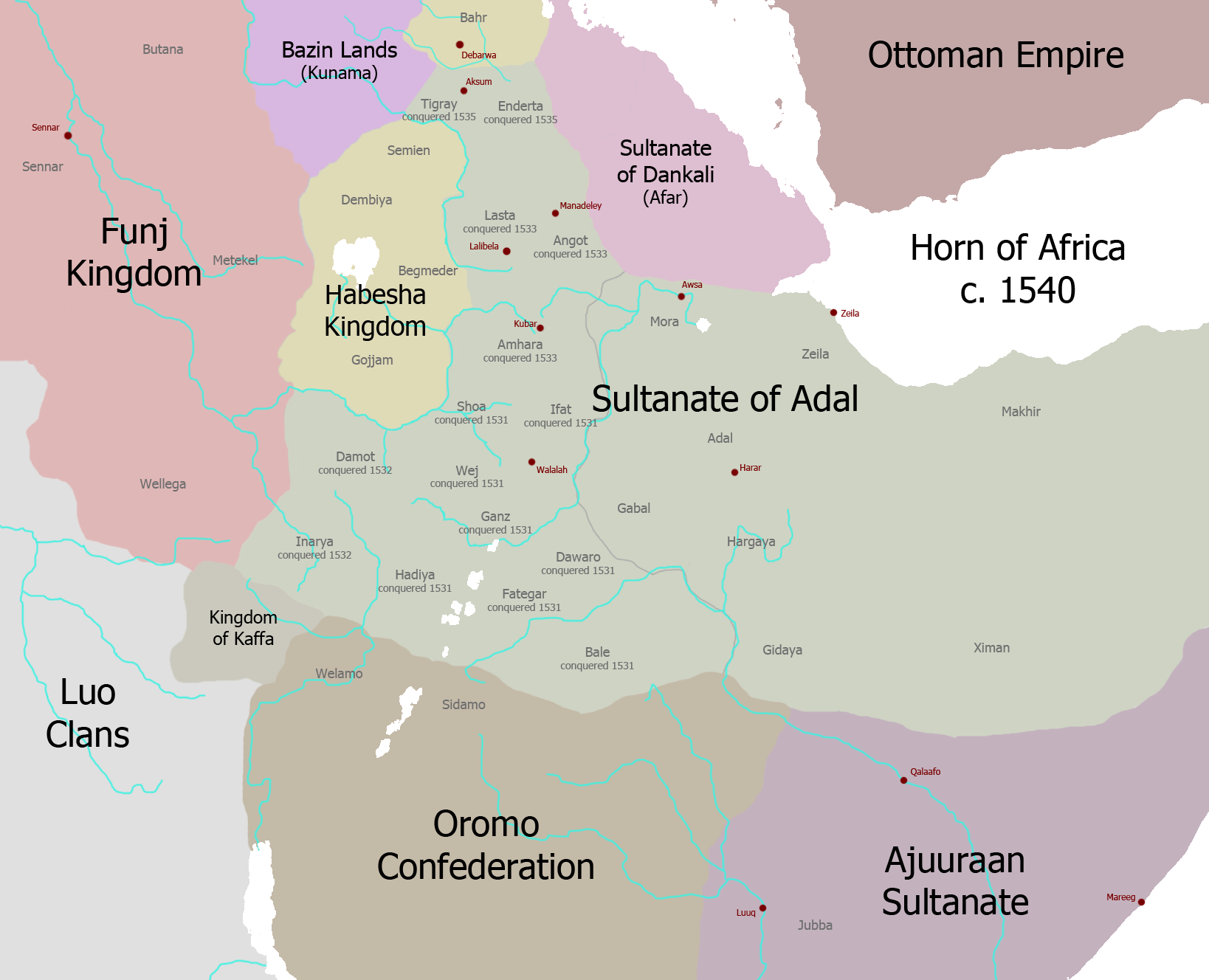
Conquests of Ahmed Gurey c. 1535

The early years of Ahmad's campaign were successful; his forces defeated the Ethiopian ruler Dawit II, and by 1533, all Muslim emirates had been liberated from Christian rule. Somali armies, under Imam Ahmad's command, swept back across the Great Rift Valley and into the Ethiopian Highlands itself. Within two years, Ahmad had conquered most of Ethiopia, establishing an empire that extended from the highlands to Cape Guardafui on the Somali coast. However, as foreign powers became involved, the conflict reached a stalemate, with both sides exhausting their resources and manpower.

This led to the contraction of both powers, altering regional dynamics for centuries. Many historians trace the origins of modern hostility between Somalia and Ethiopia back to this war. Haggai Erlich coined the term 'Ahmed Gragn Syndrome' to describe the deep-seated Ethiopian suspicions and fears of Islam that arose from the devastation of the war. According to Erlich, many Ethiopians perceive Somalis as descendants of Ahmed Ibrahim, viewing them as perpetually poised to destabilize Ethiopia. This enduring legacy is believed to have significantly influenced Ethiopia's decision to invade Somalia centuries later, during the 2000s. To Somalis, Imam Ahmad is widely seen as a hero and inspiration to many Somali nationalists.

Although regional clashes between Ethiopians and Somalis persisted into the 15th and 16th centuries, they largely ceased in the mid-17th century, only to resume with Emperor Menelik's expansions at the end of the 19th century.

== Menelik's invasions (1890–1905) ==
There is no evidence that Ethiopia controlled any Somali inhabited territory at any point in history prior the Menelik's Expansions to south and south-east in the late 19th century. Rather, independent historical accounts are unanimous that prior to Ethiopian penetration into the Ogaden and Hararghe in the late 1880s Somali clans were free of Ethiopian and Shewan control. Ethiopian Emperor Menelik's expansion into Somali inhabited territory coincided with the European colonial advances in the Horn of Africa, during which the Ethiopian Empire imported a significant amount of arms from European powers. The large scale importation of European arms completely upset the balance of power between the Somalis and the Ethiopian Empire, as the colonial powers blocked Somalis from receiving firearms.

Before the emergence of the anti-colonial Dervish movement in the 20th century, Somalis had limited access to firearms. When European colonial powers began to exert influence in the Horn of Africa, the Brussels Conference Act of 1890 imposed an arms embargo on the Somali population. During the same period Ethiopian Emperor Menelik, who was legally armed with rifles by European powers through the port cities of Djibouti and Massawa, began expanding into Somali inhabited territories.

In 1887, Menelik conquered the city of Harar and in 1891 announced a programme of ambitious expansion and colonialism to the European powers. This marked the start of a tentative yet violent invasion into the Ogaden region. In the first phase of Ethiopian penetration into the region, Menelik dispatched his troops from newly conquered Harar on frequent raids that terrorized the region. Indiscriminate killing and looting was commonplace before the raiding soldiers returned to their bases with stolen livestock. Repeatedly between 1890 and 1900, Ethiopian raiding parties into the Ogaden caused devastation. The disparity in numbers and firepower left Somalis defenceless to attack.

In 1893, the then Earl of Rosebery remarked that the British government, "cannot with justice withhold from the Somali tribes under our protection such limited supply of arms as may suffice to enable them to protect themselves from predatory bands of Abyssinian's." Ethiopia claimed all Somali occupied regions as being "traditional parts of Abyssinia", but was rebuffed by both the British and Italians. In response to the threat of Menelik's expansions, many clans in what became British Somaliland accepted British protection.

Using newly conquered Harar as a base, Ethiopian military expeditions were dispatched to exact tribute from the Somali and Oromo populations of the south. By the mid-1890s these incursions had started penetrating far into Somali inhabited territory, reaching the city of Luuq in 1896. Rumour was widely circulated in the Banaadir region (Mogadishu and it environs) that the invaders intended to reach the Indian Ocean coast. The widely perceived "Ethiopian menace" was a factor in prompting Antonio Cecchi, a major proponent of Italian expansion, to seek an alliance with the Somalis of the south, though his effort failed disastrously when his troops were besieged and massacred at Lafoole.

While previous Ethiopian raids had been primarily disruptive to trade, Emperor Meneliks well armed incursions in the era of colonialism provoked significant unease among the Somali all the way to the Banaadir coast. A force of several thousand Ethiopian horseman armed with rifles pushed into the Shabelle valley near Balad, only a days march from Mogadishu during the spring of 1905. Several clans residing in the region engaged in battles with the invading forces. Somali poetry recording the event noted that though many had been killed by the well armed Ethiopians, Muslim fighters of several clans had confronted and defeated the invasion at Yaaqle. Contemporary Somali literature suggests that the Ethiopians were initially perceived to be a larger danger than the Italians, who at the time were confined to coastal enclaves.

=== Border treaties and land transfers ===
Notably, in 1897 the British and Ethiopian Empire's signed the Anglo-Ethiopian Treaty. In hopes of securing Emperor Menelik's neutrality while the Mahdist revolt was raging in Sudan, the British transferred large expanses of land belonging to the British Somaliland Protectorate over to Ethiopia. No Somalis participated in the treaty, and its existence was concealed from them. Largely due to the minimal presence and activity of Ethiopian forces in the region, Somalis remained largely unaware of the change in status. The previous year another treaty, this time between Ethiopians and Italian Somaliland in the south, aimed to delineate a border. Once more, no consultation of Somalis occurred and no record of the agreement terms exists.

In the following century, Ethiopia's claim on the Ogaden rested on the Anglo-Ethiopian Treaty of 1897. Ethiopian administration of the Ogaden was "sketchy in the extreme". Sporadic tax raids into the region often failed and Ethiopian administrators and military personnel only resided in Harar and Jijiga.

== Modern conflict (1934–1991) ==
In the years leading up to the Second Italo-Ethiopian War in 1935, the Ethiopian hold on the Ogaden remained tenuous. Attempts at taxation in the region were called off following the massacre of 150 Ethiopian troops in January 1915. Due to native hostility, the region had nearly no Ethiopian presence until the Anglo-Ethiopian boundary commission in 1934 and the Ual-Ual Incident in 1935. Only during 1934, as the Anglo-Ethiopian boundary commission attempted to demarcate the border, did Somalis who had been transferred to the Ethiopian Empire realize what was happening. This long period of ignorance about the transfer of their regions was facilitated by the lack of 'any semblance' of effective administration of control being present over the Somalis to indicate that they were being annexed by Ethiopia.

In 1941, the British Royal Air Force dropped leaflets over Italian-occupied territory on behalf of Emperor Haile Selassie. These leaflets pronounced his claim to the major Somali coastal city of Mogadishu and it environs (known as the Banaadir region), declaring:

"I have come to restore the independence of our country, including Eritrea and the Benadir, whose people will henceforth dwell under the shade of the Ethiopian flag."

=== Post-WWII ===
After Italy lost control of Italian Somaliland and Eritrea during the Second World War, these regions came under British military administration. It was during this period that Ethiopian Emperor Haile Selassie expressed a keen interest in both territories, which his government deemed 'lost provinces' of the empire. He laid claim to them openly, asserting that the ancient Somali coastal region of Banaadir, which encompasses Mogadishu, as well as the adjacent Indian Ocean coastline, rightfully belonged to Ethiopia based on historical grounds. Following the conclusion of World War II and the establishment of the United Nations, Ethiopia submitted a memorandum to the UN, contending that prior to the era of European colonialism, the Ethiopian empire had encompassed the Indian Ocean coastline of Italian Somaliland. The Ethiopian government of Haile Selassie published a memorandum titled 'On the return of Eritrea and Somaliland' which stated:

"In view of the abject misery of the Eritrean and Somali populations under fifty years of Italian occupation...It is firmly claimed that with the forfeiture of Italian rule, Eritrea and Somaliland should revert to their mother country. To provide for such a return would be merely to recognize the realities of the existing historical and other ties which bind them integrally to Ethiopia."

=== Ogaden and Haud transfer ===
In 1948, the British Military Administration, which had been in control of the Somali inhabited Ogaden region since WWII, commenced a withdrawal. This transition saw the replacement of British officials with Ethiopian counterparts between May and July of that year in a significant handover process.

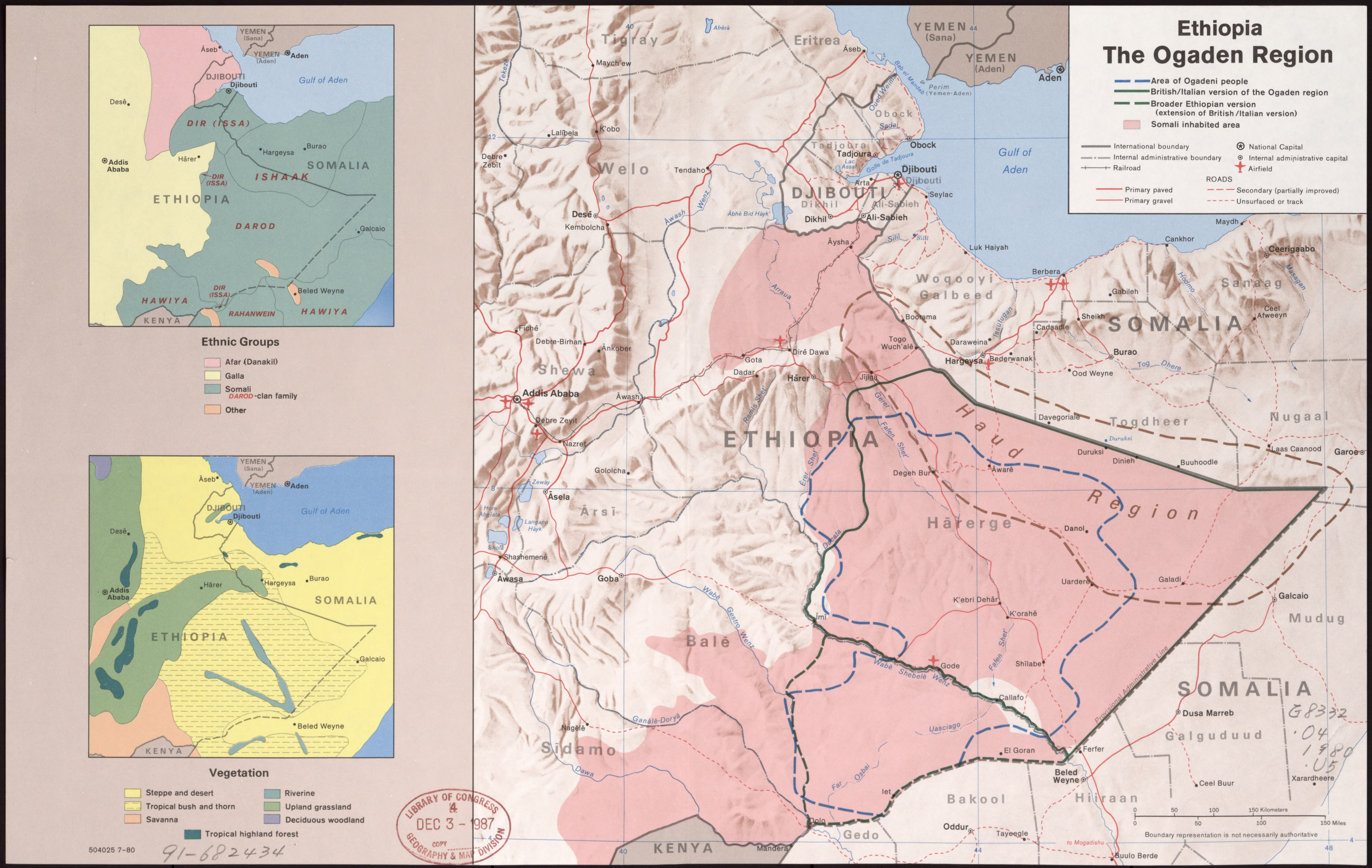
Map of the Ogaden region with Somali-inhabited land shaded in red

In the town of Jijiga, incoming Ethiopian authorities instructed the Somali Youth League (SYL) to remove their flag, as they had declared both the party and its emblem as unlawful. The SYL defied this directive, leading to the flag being machine-gunned by an armored vehicle. This event escalated following the killing of a police officer after a grenade was thrown of the roof of the SYL headquarters. The police responded by firing into a crowd of protesters killing 25.

Following this incident, Ethiopian administration resumed in Jijiga for the first time in 13 years. Then, on 23 September 1948, following the withdrawal of British forces and the appointment of Ethiopian district commissioners, areas east of Jijiga were placed under Ethiopian governance for the first time in history.

Under pressure from their World War II allies and to the dismay of the Somalis, the British "returned" the Haud (an important Somali grazing area that was presumably protected by British treaties with the Somalis in 1884 and 1886), the Reserve area and the Ogaden to Ethiopia, based on a treaty they signed in 1897 in which the British ceded Somali territory to the Ethiopian Emperor Menelik in exchange for his help against raids by Somali clans. Britain included a clause that the Somali residents would retain their autonomy, but Ethiopia immediately claimed sovereignty over the area. This prompted an unsuccessful bid by Britain in 1956 to buy back the Somali lands it had turned over. Disgruntlement with the 1948 decision led to repeated attempts by Somali parties to re-unite the ceded Ogaden, Reserve area and Haud region with the other Somali territories in Greater Somalia. Major clashes over the disputed region include:

- 1964 Border War
- 1977–1978 Ogaden War
- 1982 Border War

=== Post-Somali independence ===
Soon after the Somali Republic became independent, it was on the verge of full-scale war over the Ogaden issue with the Ethiopian Empire, particularly in 1961 and in the border war of 1964. Though the newly formed Somali government and army was weak, it had felt pressured and obliged to respond to what Somali citizens widely perceived as oppression of its brethren by an Ethiopian military occupation. In a bid to control the population of the region during the 1963 Ogaden revolt, an Ethiopian Imperial Army division based out of Harar torched Somali villages and carried out mass killings of livestock. Watering holes were machine gunned by aircraft in order to control the nomadic Somalis by denying them access to water. Thousands of residents were driven out from the Ogaden into Somalia as refugees.

Somalia was a highly vocal supporter of the Eritrean War of Independence, though material support from the Somalis has been described by scholars as, "practically meaningless". The Eritrean Liberation Front (ELF) had opened an office in Mogadishu during 1963 and Somali radio was the principle foreign media backer of the Eritrean cause during the early years. While the EPLF had ties with Somalia it did not develop close ties to the Barre regime, though EPLF members like Isaias Afwerki travelled abroad on Somali passports. In general, Somalia provided "very limited" support to the Eritrean insurgents.

Throughout the late 1970s, unrest in the Ogaden region continued as the Western Somali Liberation Front (WSLF) waged a guerrilla war against the Ethiopian government. Ethiopia and Somalia fought the Ogaden War during 1977–78 over the region and its peoples. After the war, an estimated 800,000 people crossed the border into Somalia where they would be displaced as refugees for the next 15 years. The defeat of the WSLF and Somali National Army in early 1978 did not result in the pacification of the Ogaden.

At the end of 1978 the first major outflow of refugees numbering in the hundreds of thousands headed for Somalia and were bombed and strafed during the exodus by the Ethiopian military. During 1979, the Western Somali Liberation Front persisted in its resistance, regaining control of rural areas. In the early 1980s the Ethiopian government rendered the Ogaden a vast military zone, engaging in indiscriminate aerial bombardments and forced resettlement programs. During 1981 there were an estimated 70,000 Ethiopian troops in the Ogaden, supported by 10,000 Cuban army troops who garrisoned the regions towns.

=== Somali Rebellion ===
During June 1982, 15,000 Ethiopian army troops and thousands of Somali Salvation Democratic Front (SSDF) rebels invaded Somalia across the border in the Hiran and Mudug region. The SSDF possessed little autonomy over Ethiopian security forces, as it was 'created, organized, trained and financed by Ethiopia'. These rebels were directly integrated into much larger Ethiopian army units. The Ethiopian army intended to us the SSDF to overthrow Barre and install a friendly regime, but the conflict devolved into a military stalemate around the border towns. The invasion ultimately played to the advantage of Somali President Siad Barre, whose regime saw a surge in domestic support. The Ethiopians began using the SSDF to help hunt down WSLF fighters.

By 1982 the northern Somali National Movement (SNM) transferred their headquarters to Ethiopia, as both Somalia and Ethiopia at the time offered safe havens of operation for resistance groups against each other. From there the SNM launched a guerrilla war against the Barre regime through hit and run operations on army positions before returning to Ethiopia. According to Rebecca Richards, a systematic state violence that followed was linked to the Barre government's belief that the SNM attacks were receiving assistance from the Ethiopian government. Based out of Ethiopian territory, elements of the United Somali Congress (USC) led the final military campaign the toppled Barre's government with the support of Mengistu. Ultimately the rebellion escalated into the full scale Somali Civil War in 1991 as opposition groups, supported by Ethiopia, proliferated.

== Ethiopian intervention in Somali Civil War (1996–2006) ==
The first incursion by Ethiopian troops after the fall of the central Somali government took place in August 1996.

Some Ethiopian troops joined the fighting against Islamists in Puntland during the 1990s. In March 1999, Ethiopian troops reportedly raided the Somali border town of Balanballe in pursuit of members of the al-Ittihad al-Islamiya group which had been fighting to unite Ethiopia's eastern Ogaden region with Somalia. In June 1999, Ethiopian troops supported a Rahanweyne Resistance Army attack on Baidoa with air power and artillery.

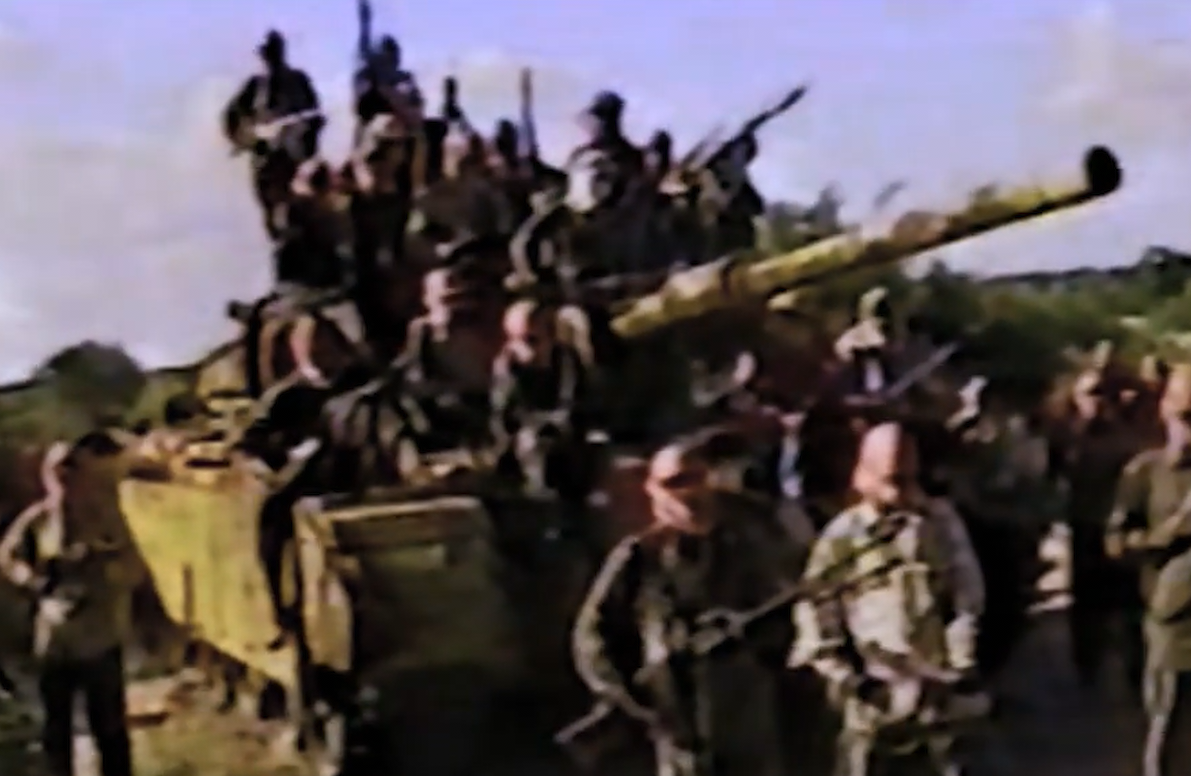
Somali insurgents from Al-Itihaad al-Islamiya in Gedo region (1996)

In April 1999 two major Somali leaders, Ali Mahdi and Hussein Aideed, said in an official protest to the United Nations Security Council, that heavily armed Ethiopian troops entered the towns of Beledhawo and Doollow on Friday, 9 April 1999. They further alleged that the Ethiopian troops had taken over the local administration and detained officials in the towns.

In May 1999, Ethiopian soldiers, with the help of a pro-Ethiopian Somali faction occupied the town of Luuq in southwestern Somalia, close to the borders with Ethiopia and Kenya. In late June 1999, Ethiopian soldiers, supported by armoured vehicles launched an attack from Luuq that resulted in the capture of Garbahare in the Gedo region, which was previously controlled by the Somali National Front led by Hussein Aideed. The attack was apparently aimed at flushing out Ethiopian rebels based in Somalia.

=== Ethiopia–TNG conflict (2000–2004) ===
Ethiopia backed a coalition of warlords in order to undermine an attempt at restoring a government in Somalia when the Transitional National Government (TNG) under President Abdiqasim Salad Hassan formed in 2000. Before becoming president of the Ethiopian backed Transitional Federal Government (TFG) during 2004, Abdullahi Yusuf - a powerful warlord, was a member of the coalition.

The Ethiopian government claimed the TNG of President Abdiqasim was staffed by members of Al-Ittihad Al-Islamiya, and after the 9/11 attacks, Addis Ababa openly accused the TNG leadership of being Islamic extremists who were pro-Bin Laden.

Over the early 2000s, Ethiopia has supported and is alleged to have supported a number of different Somali factions at one time or another. Among these are the Somalia Reconciliation and Restoration Council (SRRC), Muse Sudi Yalahow, General Mohammed Said Hirsi Morgan (allied to the Somali Patriotic Movement or SPM), Hassan Mohamed Nur Shatigudud and his Rahanwein Resistance Army (RRA) and Abdullahi Yusuf Ahmed (former President of Puntland and current Somali TNG President). A number of Somali warlord factions have also held meetings and formed loose alliances in Ethiopia.

In February 2003, Ethiopia's Prime Minister, Meles Zenawi, admitted that Ethiopian troops were occasionally sent into Somalia to battle the militant Islamist group, al-Ittihad and stated that the group was linked to al-Qaeda. He also claimed that Ethiopia's government had lists of al-Ittihad members who were, at the time, in the Transitional National Government and parliament of Somalia; a claim that TNG President Abdiqasim Salad Hassan has consistently denied. President Hassan has in turn, accused Ethiopia of destabilizing Somalia, interfering daily in Somali affairs and violating the arms embargo on Somalia by supplying weapons to warlords opposed to the Transitional Government at the time; Ethiopia denied these charges.

==== Incursions in Puntland and Gedo regions ====
In January 2001, Somalia's TNG Prime Minister, Ali Khalif Galaydh, accused Ethiopia of arming factions opposed to the government, occupying Somali districts and increasing its military presence in the country. He later claimed that Ethiopian soldiers had occupied towns in Somalia's southwestern region, and had detained and intimidated its nationals; the Ethiopian government denied these charges.

During the Puntland Crisis of 2001–2002, Ethiopian troops entered Somalia again. In November 2001, Abdullahi Yusuf attacked Garowe backed by 700 to 1,000 Ethiopian troops in order halt the election of political rival Jama Ali Jama as the president of Puntland state. The Ethiopians withdrew the day following the incident. Ethiopian troops finally ousted Jama and install Yusuf six months later in May 2002. Yusuf claimed his political rivals were backed by al-Ittihad. Reports in early January, 2002 indicated that around 300 Ethiopian soldiers were deployed in Garowe (capital of Puntland) with other Ethiopian troops reportedly moving into the neighbouring Bay region and around Baidoa. The Ethiopian government denied its troops were present in Somalia and accused the TNG of lying.

In May 2002, BBC News reported Ethiopian troops launched an incursion into Gedo to support militias fighting against the Transitional National Government. Ethiopian soldiers again attacked and temporarily captured the border town of Beledhawo on 15 May 2002 with the help of the SRRC after the town had been captured by a rival militia. During the raid, the commander of the rival militia, Colonel Abdirizak Issak Bihi, was captured by the Ethiopian forces and taken across the border to Ethiopia. Control of the town was turned over to the SRRC.

=== Ethiopian invasion & occupation of Somalia (2006–2009) ===
The Ethiopian government heavily backed Abdullahi Yusuf's presidency and the formation of the Transitional Federal Government (TFG) in 2004 on the grounds that Yusuf would give up Somalia's long standing claim to the Ogaden. The rise of the Islamic Courts Union raised Ethiopian concerns of an eventual renewed drive for a Greater Somalia, as a strong Somali state not dependent on Addis Ababa was perceived as a security threat. In 2006 Al-Jazeera described Ethiopia as, "...one of the biggest beneficiaries of the demise of the Somali state and its fragmentation."

British television station Channel 4 acquired a leaked document detailing a confidential meeting between senior American and Ethiopian officials in Addis Ababa, involving no Somalis, six months prior to the full scale invasion of Somalia during December 2006. The Ethiopians and Americans deliberated on various scenarios, with the 'worst-case scenario' being the potential takeover of Somalia by the Islamic Courts Union. The documents revealed that the US found the prospect unacceptable and would back Ethiopia in the event of an ICU takeover. Journalist Jon Snow reported that during the meeting ‘the blueprint for a very American supported Ethiopian invasion of Somalia was hatched’.

By the end of the second year of the Ethiopian military occupation, the majority of the territory seized from the Islamic Courts Union during the December 2006 and January 2007 invasion had fallen under the control of various Islamist and nationalist resistance groups. On 12 January 2009, the last ENDF troops withdrew from Mogadishu, ending the two year long occupation of the capital. The occupation largely failed. By the time of the withdrawal, the TFG possessed control over only a few streets and buildings in Mogadishu with the rest of the city coming under control of Islamist factions, particularly al-Shabaab.

The withdrawal of Ethiopian troops sapped al-Shabaab of the widespread support it had enjoyed from Somali civilians and across clan lines as a resistance faction during the occupation, but came too late to have a substantial impact on the group's transformation into a formidable oppositional force. Al-Shabaab battle hardened over the Ethiopian occupation and notably began governing territory for the first time in 2008. Instead of eliminating 'Jihadist' activity in Somalia, the Ethiopian invasion had the effect of creating more 'Jihadis' than had existed in the country before. By the time of the ENDF withdrawal, al-Shabaab's forces had grown significantly in numbers, swelling from a few hundred to several thousand fighters strong since the invasion began. The invasion had helped the group grow among young Somalis in particular.

After the killing of the group's leader Aden Hashi Ayro in 2008, al-Shabaab began publicly courting Osama bin Laden in a bid to become part of al-Qaeda, but was rebuffed by bin Laden. Following his death, al-Shabaab pledged allegiance to al-Qaeda in 2012. In 2024, Somalia's Minister of Justice Hassan Moalim publicly stated the wave of terrorism the country is experiencing was the 'direct result' of the 2006 invasion.

== Present conflict ==
=== AMISOM/ATMIS/AUSSOM and non-AU Ethiopian forces (2014 – present) ===
In 2014, Ethiopia was formerly integrated into the African Union Mission in Somalia, which has transitioned to the African Union Transition Mission in Somalia, and now the African Union Support and Stabilization Mission in Somalia. When Ethiopia joined the peacekeeping force, AMISOM spokesman Ali Aden Humad claimed that this time was 'different' from 2006 and that Ethiopia would have to respect rules of engagement.

Information regarding casualties in Somalia is unknown as the ENDF designates all operations in the country "Top Secret".

=== Al-Shabaab invasion of Ethiopia (2022) ===
On 20 July 2022, the Islamist militant group al-Shabaab launched an invasion from Somalia into Ethiopia's Somali Region. Taking advantage of the instability created by the Tigray war, the goal of the operation was to establish a presence for the group within southern Ethiopia.

The incursion began with over a thousand al-Shabaab fighters staging diversionary attacks on four Ethiopian–Somali border towns in order to allow a force of 500 to 800 fighters to penetrate the Ethiopian security zone and advance into the region. During the initial days of fighting, al-Shabaab primarily fought against the Somali Region's security forces. Further cross-border attacks continued in the following days, while the Ethiopian National Defense Force (ENDF) carried out counter-offensives in response.

Al-Shabaab forces advanced 150 kilometres into the Ogaden. After two weeks of intense clashes and airstrikes, the ENDF and Somali Region security forces began to reassert control. A battalion of around 500 al-Shabaab fighters succeeded in evading the Ethiopian army and reached its main target, the Bale Mountains. Several weeks after the operation was over, clashes continued to break out in border regions.

Following what was the largest attack by al-Shabaab in Ethiopian territory to date, the group was able to establish a presence in Bale and created several training camps. Al-Shabaab has not claimed any attacks in Ethiopia since mid-2022 in order to maintain their operational security. It has continued to probe the Ethiopian–Somali border in the three years since the operation.

=== Rising Ethiopian–Somali tensions (2023–present) ===
In January 2024, Ethiopian Prime Minister Abiy Ahmed signed a deal with the breakaway region of Somaliland for recognition as an independent state in exchange for a 20km naval/commercial base on the northern Somali coast. Kenyan intellectual Peter Kagwanja observed that security officials in Mogadishu have become increasingly concerned by the possibility of an Ethiopian blitzkrieg akin to the 2006 invasion. This has prompted the Somalia government to turn to Egypt and Turkey for military defence. In April 2024, the Somali government expelled Ethiopia's ambassador for interference in internal affairs and recalled its envoy from Addis Ababa. Somali government officials warned Ethiopian troops to withdraw from Somalia by January 2025. Analysts remained uncertain whether the government could enforce such a demand, given the entrenched presence of Ethiopian forces in regions like Gedo, Hiran, Bay, and Bakool. Around 10,000 Ethiopian troops were then deployed in Somalia.

In 2023, SSC Khatumo forces launched an uprising in Las Anod to expel Somaliland forces and reunify the region with Somalia. After a significant defeat in August 2023, Somaliland retreated, establishing a 100km front line from Las Anod by August 2024, with a military stalemate in place. Increased Somaliland troop training in Ethiopia in 2024 fueled speculation that Somaliland may be planning a new offensive to reclaim territory lost to SSC.

In response to Ethiopia's attempts to establish a naval base and recognize Somaliland, Somalia increasingly turned to Egypt. In August 2024, the Somali government announced that in January 2025, the Egyptian military would replace the Ethiopian troops currently deployed with the African Union force in Somalia, with 10,000 Egyptian troops being sent. Egyptian officials stated that they would send weapons including armored vehicles, artillery, radars, and drones to Somalia as part of the defence deal. At the end of August, Egypt began supplying Somalia with arms and ammunition. Ethiopia's foreign ministry responded to the Egypt–Somalia agreement by warning that Ethiopia would not "stand idle while other actors are taking measures to destabilize the region." The rise in tensions has caused fears of a major interstate conflict breaking out in the Horn of Africa.

On 10 September 2024, the Ethiopian military seized control of all airports in the Gedo region of Somalia, including the strategic airfields of Luuq, Dolow, and Bardhere and Garbahare. The operation had reportedly been undertaken to prevent the future deployment of Egyptian troops in the area. Somali President Hassan Sheikh accused Ethiopia of "waging a campaign of sabotage against Somalia." In late October 2024, Somalia expelled an Ethiopian diplomat after alleging internal interference.

Ethiopia's push for the sea has reportedly led thousands, many from northern Somalia, to join al-Shabaab as the organization has positioned itself as the nations protector. In early November 2024, al-Shabaab leader Sheikh Abu Ubeida delivered a 45-minute speech condemning Ethiopia's push for naval access to Somalia's coast, asserting that Ethiopia is in the final stages of seizing Somalia's waters. He called for the ousting of Somali President Hassan Sheikh and other regional leaders, accusing them of welcoming Ethiopian influence in Mogadishu, Baidoa, Garowe, and Hargeisa. Ubeida also claimed that these leaders had formally recognized Ethiopia's claim over the Somali Region (Ogaden). Finally, he urged young people across the Horn of Africa to join al-Shabaab in taking up arms against Ethiopia.

On 27 December 2024, the United Nations Security Council approved the Resolution 2767 deployment of the African Union Support and Stabilization Mission in Somalia (AUSSOM), effective 1 January, replacing the current African Union Transition Mission in Somalia. Subsequently, Somalia rejected Ethiopia's participation in AUSSOM amid tensions over a memorandum of understanding that Ethiopia signed with Somaliland in January. Somalia considers the memorandum a violation of its sovereignty and has instead asked Egypt to contribute troops to the mission.

== See also ==
- History of Somalia
- History of Ethiopia
- Ethiopian–Adal war
- Ethiopia–Somalia relations

== Bibliography ==
- Barnett, James (September 2023). Faltering Lion: Analyzing Progress and Setbacks in Somalia's War against al-Shabaab (PDF) (Report). Washington, DC: Hudson Institute.
- Drysdale, John (1964). The Somali Dispute. United Kingdom: Frederick A. Praeger. OCLC 467147.
- FitzGibbon, Louis (1985). The Evaded Duty. London: Rex Collings. ISBN 0860362094. OCLC 15018961.
- Lewis, I.M., ed. (1983). Nationalism & Self Determination in the Horn of Africa. Ithaca Press. ISBN 978-0-903729-93-2.
- Fitzgibbon, Louis (1982). The Betrayal of the Somalis. R. Collings. ISBN 0860361942.
- Abdi, Mohamed Mohamud (2021). A History of the Ogaden (Western Somali) Struggle for Self-Determination: Part I (1300-2007) (2nd ed.). UK: Safis Publishing. ISBN 978-1-906342-39-5. OCLC 165059930.
