= Jilib National Park =

National park in Somalia

- IUCN category II (national park)
- Interactive map of Jilib National Park
- Location: middle Juba, Somalia
- Nearest city: Jilib
- Coordinates: 3.783333°N 47.116667°E
- Area: 9,50km sq
- Established: 1970s
- Visitors: After Civil war begun 1991 none Visitors (in 1988 300 Visitors counted)
- Governing body: Ministry of Tourism and Wildlife

Jilib National Park (JNP) is the largest national park in Somalia. It is around 950 km square kilometres in area. It lies in the south of the country, just off the main road between Mogadishu and Jilib. The nearest towns are Haranka, Makaso, Geesguud, Galshiq-Abiikar, Arbo Abdi, Dhay-Tubako and Homboy.

== History ==
Jilib National Park was the first national park to be established in the country. During 1970s, the Ministry of Tourism under the Siad Barre administration sought to center the tourist industry in the vicinity of the park.

By 1989, newer legislation was drafted governing the establishment of national parks, game reserves and special reserves. The conservation of wildlife resources was at this time overseen by the Ministry of Livestock, Forestry and Range's National Range Agency. Its Department of Wildlife also operated an independent law-enforcement unit, which had been created through presidential decree. Following the outbreak of the civil war in 1991, development of the national park came to a halt. After the collapse of the central government of Somalia, a group of diaspora from the sheekhaal community tried to restore wildlife tourism in their region Middle Juba, and they held various conference meetings in many places outside of the country they agreed to build the park with contribution fund.

== Wildlife ==
African bush elephant population low in the 1980s caused by poaching, and numbered over 100 before begin Somali Civil War 1991. The African buffalo in the 1950s and 1980s increased to 1500 individuals . The black rhinoceros population was small number to about 30 individuals in the 1980s.

Other mammal carnivores include the Cheetah, spotted hyena, black-backed jackal, honey badger, caracal, serval, banded mongoose. The African wild dog was reintroduced to the area in 1980s after disappearing in 1991 when the Somali Civil War begun. Other mammals include hippopotamus, common warthog, aardvark, aardwolf, African wildcat, African civet, common genet, striped weasel, bat-eared fox, ground pangolin, crested porcupine.

Reptiles include Nile crocodile, Nile monitor, Jackson's chameleon, African python, black mamba, black-necked spitting cobra, and puff adder.

== External sources ==
- "Somalia National Parks". Happy Tours. Archived from the original on 15 June 2013.
