= List of Ethiopian–Somali wars and conflicts =

The following is a list of Ethiopian–Somali wars and conflicts, giving an overview of the historic and recent conflicts between Ethiopia, Somalia, and Insurgents

- 1963–1965 Ogaden Revolt
- 1963–1970 Bale Revolt
- 1964 Ethiopian–Somali Border War
- 1974–1991 Ethiopian Civil War (WSLF insurgency)
- 1977–1978 Ogaden War
- 1982–1983 Ethiopian–Somali Border War
- 1992–2018 Insurgency in Ogaden (ONLF and AIAI insurgency)
- 1996–2002 early Somali Civil War cross border incursions
- 2006–2009 Ethiopian invasion and occupation of Somalia
- 2007–2008 Ethiopian crackdown in Ogaden (primarily against ONLF)
- 2011–Present current phase of Somali Civil War (primarily against Al-Shabaab)
- 2022 al-Shabaab invasion of Ethiopia

== See also ==
- Ethiopian–Somali conflict
- Military history of Somalia
- Military history of Ethiopia
- Foreign relations of Somalia
- Foreign relations of Ethiopia
- List of wars involving Ethiopia
