= 1964 Ethiopian–Somali Border War =

Armed conflict in the Horn of Africa

- Part of Ethiopian–Somali conflict and the Cold War
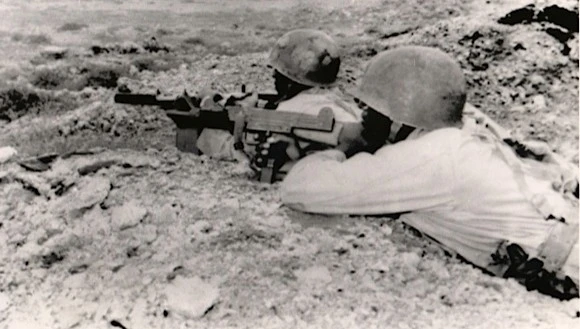
- Ethiopian soldiers on the border with Somalia
Date	8 February – 2 April 1964 (2 months)
Location	Ethiopia–Somalia border
Result	Stalemate, see Outcome: Armistice; Status quo ante bellum; Demilitarized zone created; July 1964 OAU Cairo Declaration, see Aftermath

Belligerents
(Ethiopian Empire) Ethiopia	Somalia

Commanders and leaders
(Ethiopian Empire) Haile Selassie (Ethiopian Empire) Merid Mengesha (Ethiopian Empire) Aman Mikael Andom	(Somalia) Aden Adde (Somalia) Daud Abdulle Hirsi

Strength
30,000 (pre–war); 55,000 (initial); 60,000 (peak) soldiers	4,000 (pre–war); 9,000 (initial); 11,000 (peak) soldiers 3,000 (peak) insurgents

Casualties and losses
- 1,000–2,000 killed (civilians possibly included)
- Although clashes had occurred before 8 February 1964, the day both Somalia and Ethiopia declared states of emergency is generally considered as the wars start

The 1964 Ethiopian–Somali Border War, also known as the First Ogaden War marked the first military conflict between the newly established Somali Republic and the Ethiopian Empire, lasting from February to April 1964. The border conflict was preceded by a rebellion in the Ogaden region during mid-1963 that was waged by Somalis seeking self-determination from imperial rule. Large scale Ethiopian counterinsurgency operations and increasingly harsh military crackdowns on the population of the Ogaden carried out by Emperor Haile Selassie's government resulted in a rapid decline in Ethio-Somali relations, leading to direct confrontation between both governments' armed forces.

Sporadic small-scale skirmishes between border police and Ethiopian airstrikes that began along the border in late 1963 escalated into large-scale warfare in early 1964. The conflict highlighted the disparity in military strength between the larger and highly equipped Ethiopian Imperial Army and the nascent Somali National Army, which had only formed during independence four years prior.

In mid-January 1964, border violence escalated and on 8 February both nations declared states of emergency. Regular army units from both militaries were deployed along the northern border, resulting in numerous large-scale military engagements in the Haud, such as the Battle of Tog Wajaale. In the days following, the war spread across the entire 900-km Ethiopian–Somali frontier with most combat taking place on the Somali side. The conflict was characterized by intense fighting around various border posts and villages, such as Dolow, and aerial bombardments by the vastly superior Ethiopian Air Force on major urban centers in Somalia such as Hargeisa and Galkayo. The Organization of African Unity (OAU) attempted to broker several ceasefire agreements, but they repeatedly failed. Despite the continuing hostilities, both nations participated in diplomatic negotiations in Khartoum, Sudan, at the request of various African heads of state.

On 30 March 1964, due to the mediation efforts of Sudanese President Ibrahim Abboud, Somalia and Ethiopia agreed to an armistice which led to the full cessation of hostilities on 2 April 1964. In the aftermath of the conflict, the two countries signed an accord in Khartoum, agreeing to withdraw their troops from the border, cease hostile propaganda, and initiate peace negotiations. A demilitarized zone was established along the border, ending major armed conflict between Somalia and Ethiopia until the Ogaden War 13 years later.

The brief two-month conflict attracted international attention, particularly within Africa and from international organizations such as the United Nations (UN) and OAU. Both Ethiopia and Somalia received varying degrees of foreign diplomatic and military support during the conflict.

== Background ==
Following World War II, Somali leaders in the Ogaden region of Ethiopia repeatedly put forward demands for self-determination, only to be ignored by both Ethiopia and the United Nations.

After the independence and unification of British Somaliland and the Trust Territory of Somaliland on 1 July 1960, one of the major goals of the Somali Republic was the unification of Greater Somalia, which included the Ogaden region. Following Somalia's independence in 1960, the Ogaden was rocked by waves of popular revolts which were brutally repressed by Emperor Haile Selassie's government - resulting in deep animosity developed towards the Amharas by the Somalis. In many regional towns the Somali people were barred from employment.

Following the establishment of the Republic of Somalia, the Ethiopian government, sensing a looming Somali threat, immediately dispatched troops to set up military bases in the Ogaden, displacing and killing hundreds of Somalis in August 1960, who made up the ethnic majority of the territory. Though the Ethiopian troops (who represented the only significant Ethiopian presence in the region) were not well received by the population, it would be another 2 years until full-scale rebellion began in the region. In this period the Ethiopian government terminated grazing rights for many Somali nomads, greatly aggravating hostilities. After a series of attacks on nomads that provoked active self defence by locals, clashes started breaking out between the Ethiopian and Somali armed forces, culminating in the 1964 war.

In April 1961, nearly 100 Somali refugees fled to Hargeisa from Degehabur in the Ogaden region, reporting that the Ethiopian army had surrounded the city and machine-gunned its residents, resulting in the death of over 150 Somalis. This act was believed to be retaliation to a petition by local Somali leaders seeking self-determination. These confrontations led to approximately 100 casualties on all sides. The volatile situation was exacerbated when Somali district commissioners in the Ogaden were replaced by Ethiopian officials, intensifying concerns over a potential 'Ethiopianization' of the Somali populace in the area.

=== 1963 Ogaden Rebellion ===
On 16 June 1963, the Ethiopian government began its first attempts to collect taxes in the Ogaden region, greatly incensing the already discontent Somali population, as they had lived without taxation for centuries. At Hodayo, a watering place north of Werder, 300 men picked a former public official named Mukhtal Dahir, to lead an insurgency against the Ethiopians referred to as "Nasrallah" or the Ogaden Liberation Front. The organization formed the foundation of the future Western Somali Liberation Front. Some of the guerrillas were equipped by the Somali government, though Dahir claimed that the only substantial support that they had received from Somalia had been related to treating wounded and taking in refugees. The New York Times reported a statement on the origins of the insurgency by Mukthal Dahir, who summarized the perspective of the Somali rebels in the Ogaden:

"We wanted our freedom. It was impossible to seek it through democratic means in a country where there is no free speech and no political party machinery, where expeditions are sent to collect taxes by force — seizing camels and mil-let crops. When we asked the Emperor for internal self-government, he threatened to shoot 180 Somali chiefs. He had an inkling what we were up to, and tried to impose a new head tax on cattle. Quran schools were ordered closed, and the laws allowed for one wife and no divorce. All this interfered with Muslim Somali traditions; and as leaders, we were expected to execute this policy. We discussed it and decided to pull out. When the Ethiopians discovered our opposition, they intended to arrest all of us. But by that time we had gone into hiding, where we formed the Liberation Government."

==== Insurgency Grows ====
For several months the insurgency fought against the Ethiopian army, swelling from just 300 to an estimated 3,000 to 12,000 insurgents (estimates greatly vary) and eventually forming a "liberation government". Many neutral Ogaden Somalis had been alienated by the loss of relatives, herds and homes in Ethiopian reprisal raids on their border villages, inflaming the resistance. At its peak, the combined forces of the insurgents controlled nearly 70 percent of the Ogaden region. Primarily, their operations were conducted in the lowland Hararghe and Bale provinces of Ethiopia. In 1963, the Somali government aided the Bale revolt that had begun among the Somali and Oromo populations of Ethiopia. The governments of the United States and Israel aided Haile Sellasie in suppressing Somali nationalism.

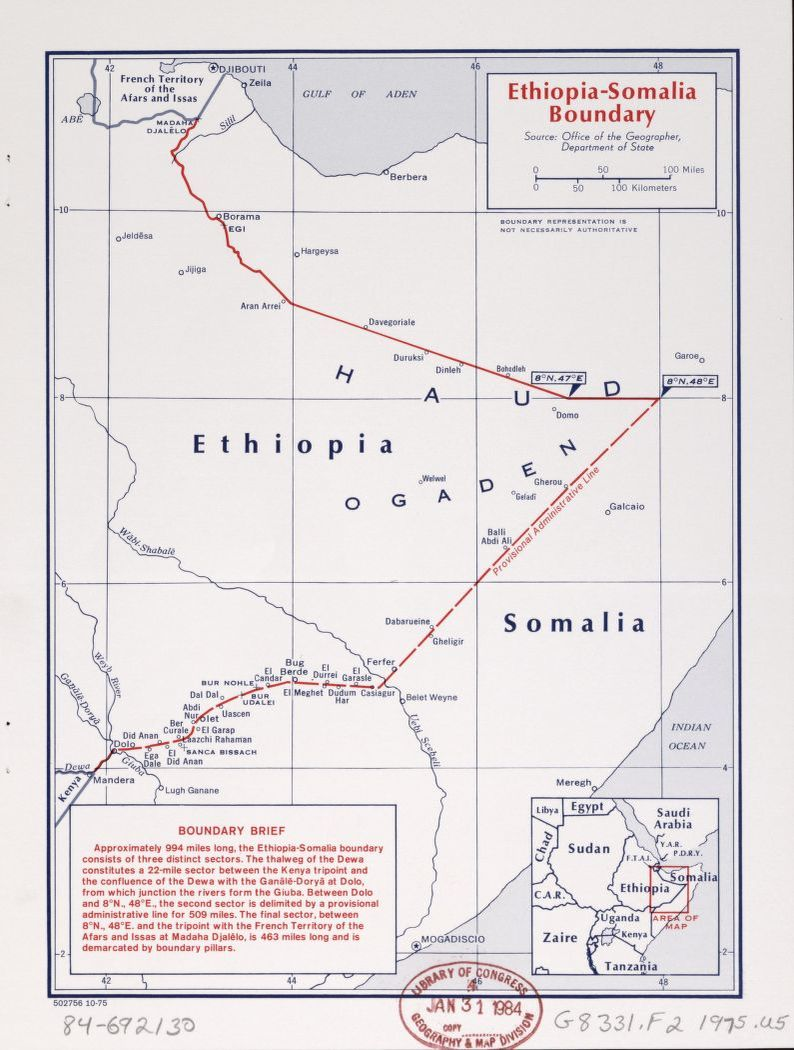
Ogaden region and Ethiopian-Somalia border

The insurgencies surprising early success is attributed to the terrain advantage the Ogaden offered, ideal for traditional guerrilla hit-and-run tactics, placing the mechanized troops at a large disadvantage. The insurgents honed their skills in ambushing military convoys, leading the Ethiopian army to restrict its operations to administrative centers. In response these centers were reinforced and deployed motor patrols, which were repeatedly ambushed by rebels seeking to obtain arms. The Ethiopian army's lackluster performance against the insurgents bolstered their confidence, encouraging them to expand their activities. However, their hit-and-run tactics ultimately proved insufficient to weaken the strategic control of the Ethiopian Empire. According to the Central Intelligence Agency, Ethiopian Defense Minister General Merid Mengesha came under fire for the poor showing of the military against the Ogaden rebels.

The Ethiopian government argued that the conflict was a result of armed bandits being sent across the border by Somalia to harass the country into ceding a large slice of Ethiopian territory, to which the Somali government repeatedly denied that it either inspired or fomented the troubles in Ogaden. Despite the Ethiopian government's allegations, it was widely recognized that the Somali government could assert no real control over the Ogaden insurgents, as the rebels had made it clear that they were not willing to take orders from Mogadishu, despite desiring its recognition. A CIA report submitted to U.S. President Lyndon B. Johnson concluded, "Somali authorities show no ability to control Somali tribesmen whose depredations in the Ogaden so infuriate the Ethiopians."

=== Suppression of Insurgency and First Border Clashes ===
In August 1963 Ethiopian forces regrouped and the 3rd Division of the Imperial Army swept back through the Ogaden with relative ease, aided an eight-week-long air campaign against Somali targets on both sides of the border and the inexperience of the guerrillas. Despite regaining control of large portions of the region the 3rd Division was unable to stamp out the insurgency. International observers reported at least 500 had been killed in the fighting on both sides.

Ethiopian Emperor Haile Selassie responded to the insurrection with brutal and repressive crackdowns against the Somalis in the Ogaden region. The Ethiopian government began mounting punitive expeditions on Somali nomads, which consisted of the total destruction or confiscation of livestock in the Somali nomadic pastoral communities. Most infamous of these reprisals was on the town of Degehabur in what became known locally as the "Kanone Massacre". Degehabur was bombarded by artillery from nearby high ground, which was followed by a killing spree when army troops later entered the settlement. In another notable incident following rebel activity in the town of Shilabo, the Ethiopian army blockaded and shelled the city to punish the inhabitants. In a bid to control the largely nomadic population of the region during 1963, an Ethiopian Imperial Army division based out of Harar torched Somali villages and carried out mass killings of livestock. Watering holes were machine gunned by aircraft in order to control the Somalis by denying them access to water. Thousands of residents were driven from the Ogaden into Somalia as refugees.

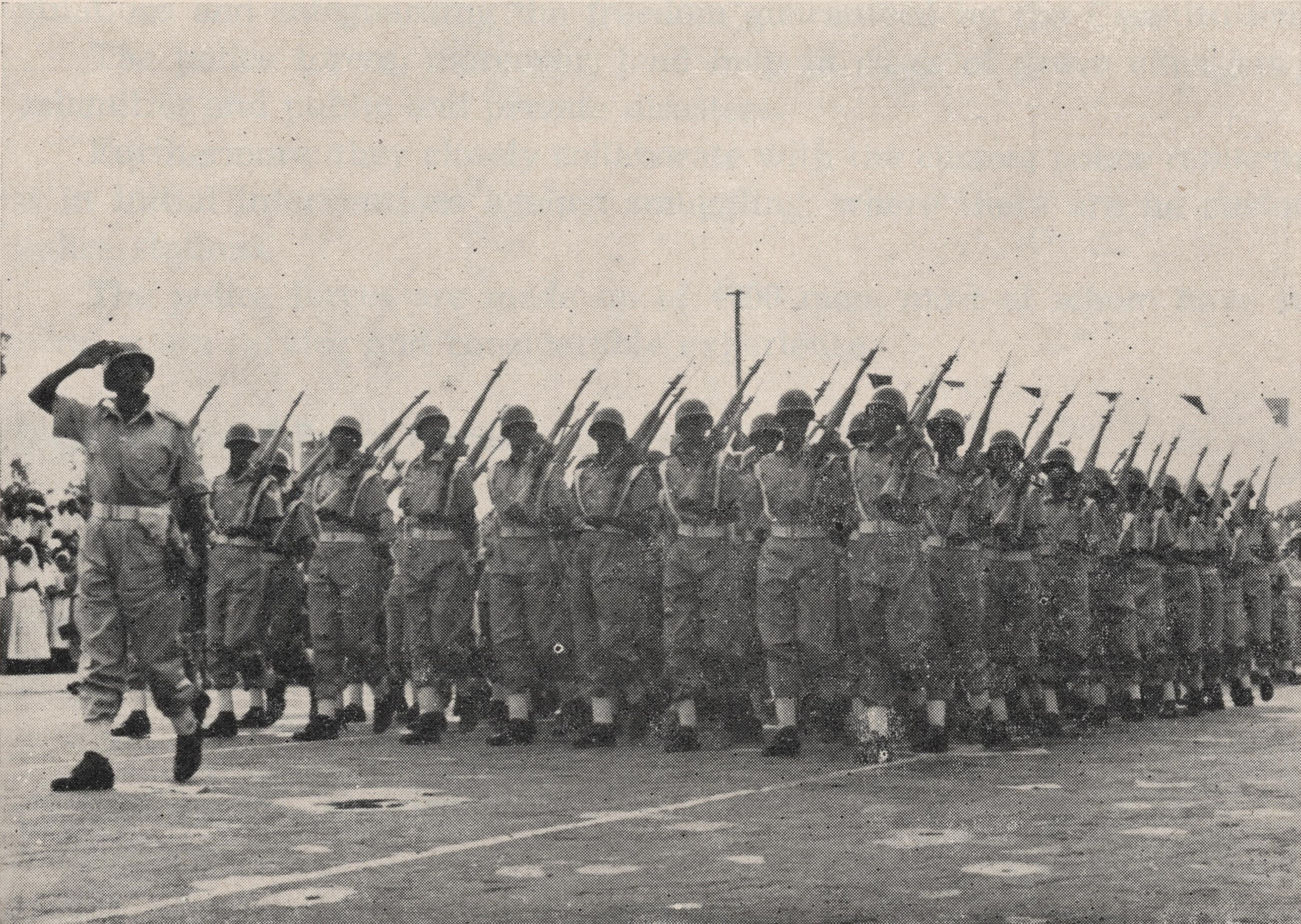
Somali National Army troops on parade (1963)

The news of these crackdowns exacerbated the already deteriorating relations between Somalia and Ethiopia, and clashes between their forces began to break out in late 1963 and early 1964. Though the newly formed Somali government and army was weak, it had felt pressured and obliged to respond to what Somali citizens widely perceived as oppression of its brethren by an Ethiopian military occupation. In late fall 1963, small units of Somali soldiers allegedly began to join and operate with the Somali Ogaden insurgents, though according to Prof. Klaus Jürgen Gantzel there has never been proof of this. During November 1963, the Somali government signed an agreement with the Soviet Union to begin working toward the creation of a 20,000 man force, effectively quadrupling the size of the Somali National Army, greatly alarming the Ethiopian government.

== Forces involved ==
=== Somali Republic ===
Composed of seven battalions, the Somali National Army (SNA) was poorly equipped and around 4,000 strong at the start of the war. The army possessed five British made Comet tanks and several armoured cars.

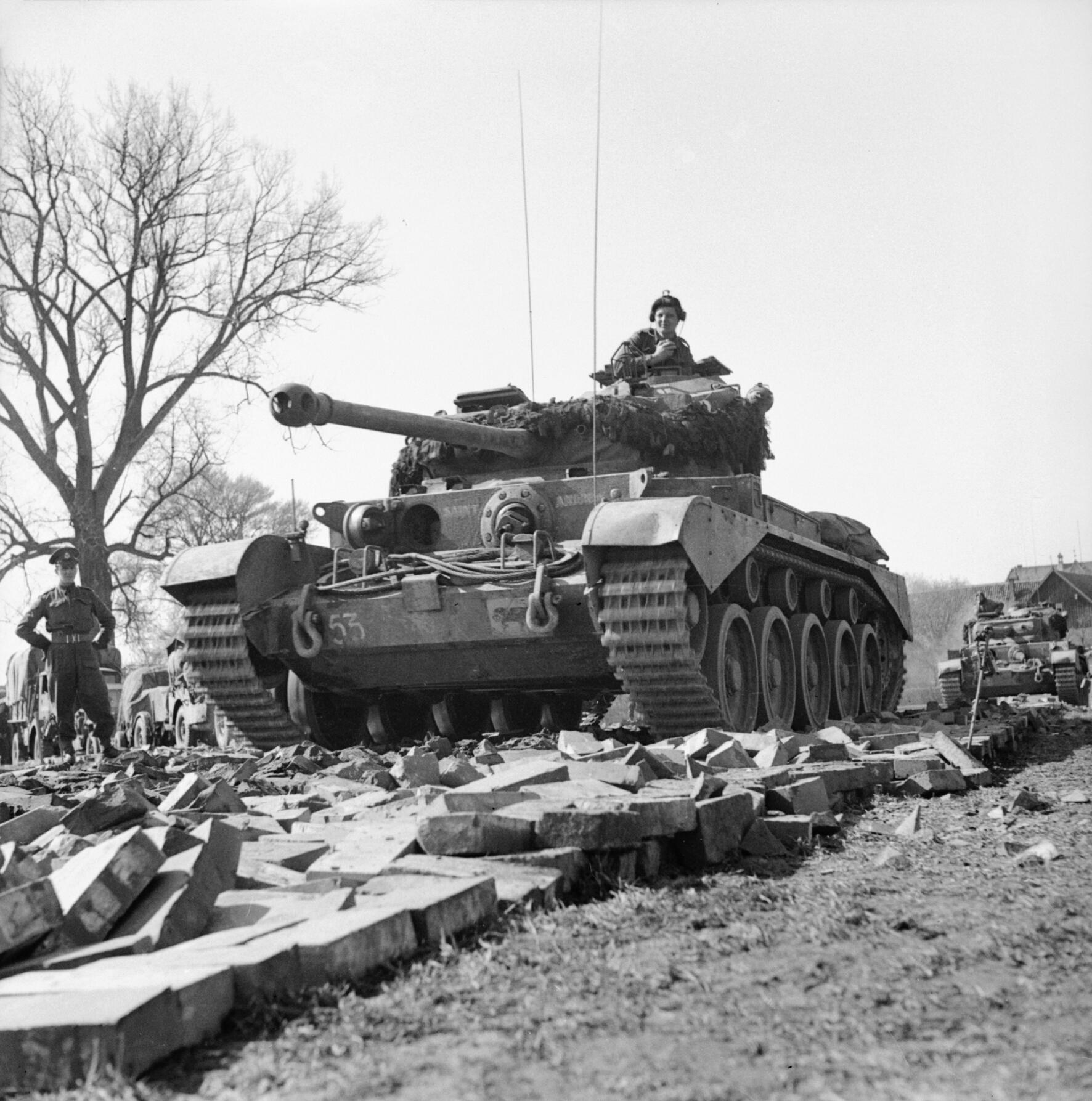
Five Comet tanks

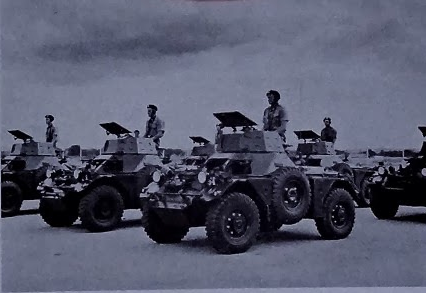
Six Ferret armoured cars

By 1964 the Somali Air Force had little combat capacity, as it only possessed transport and trainer aircraft.

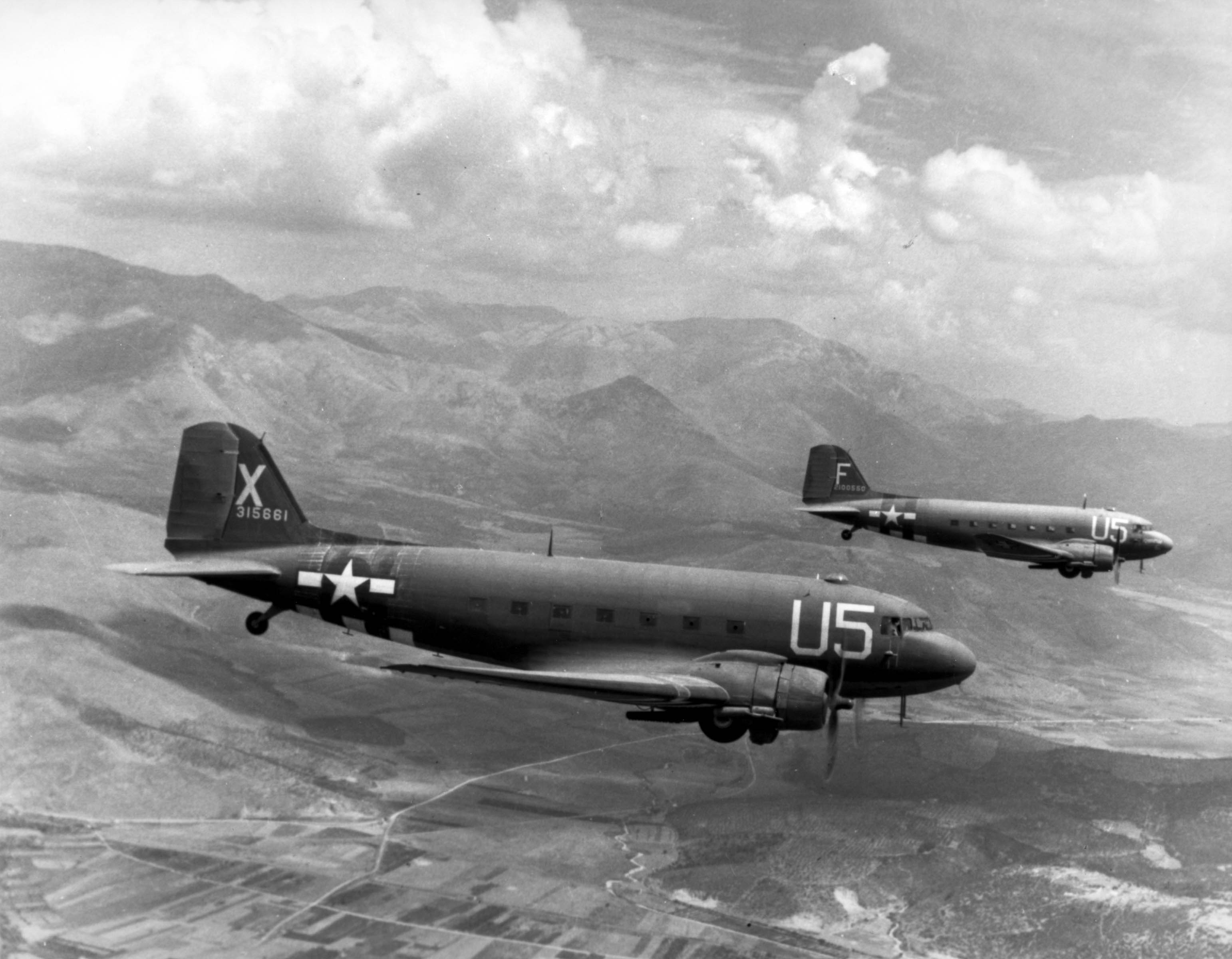
C-47 Skytrains, used by SAF for troop deployments and aerial reconnaissance

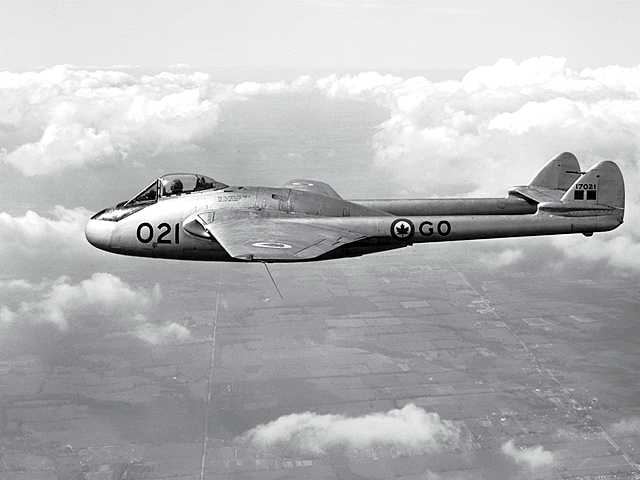
De Havilland Vampire training aircraft, used by SAF for combat air patrols

=== Ethiopian Empire ===
By the start of 1964, the Ethiopian Imperial Army fielded a total of approximately 29,000 to 30,000 men.

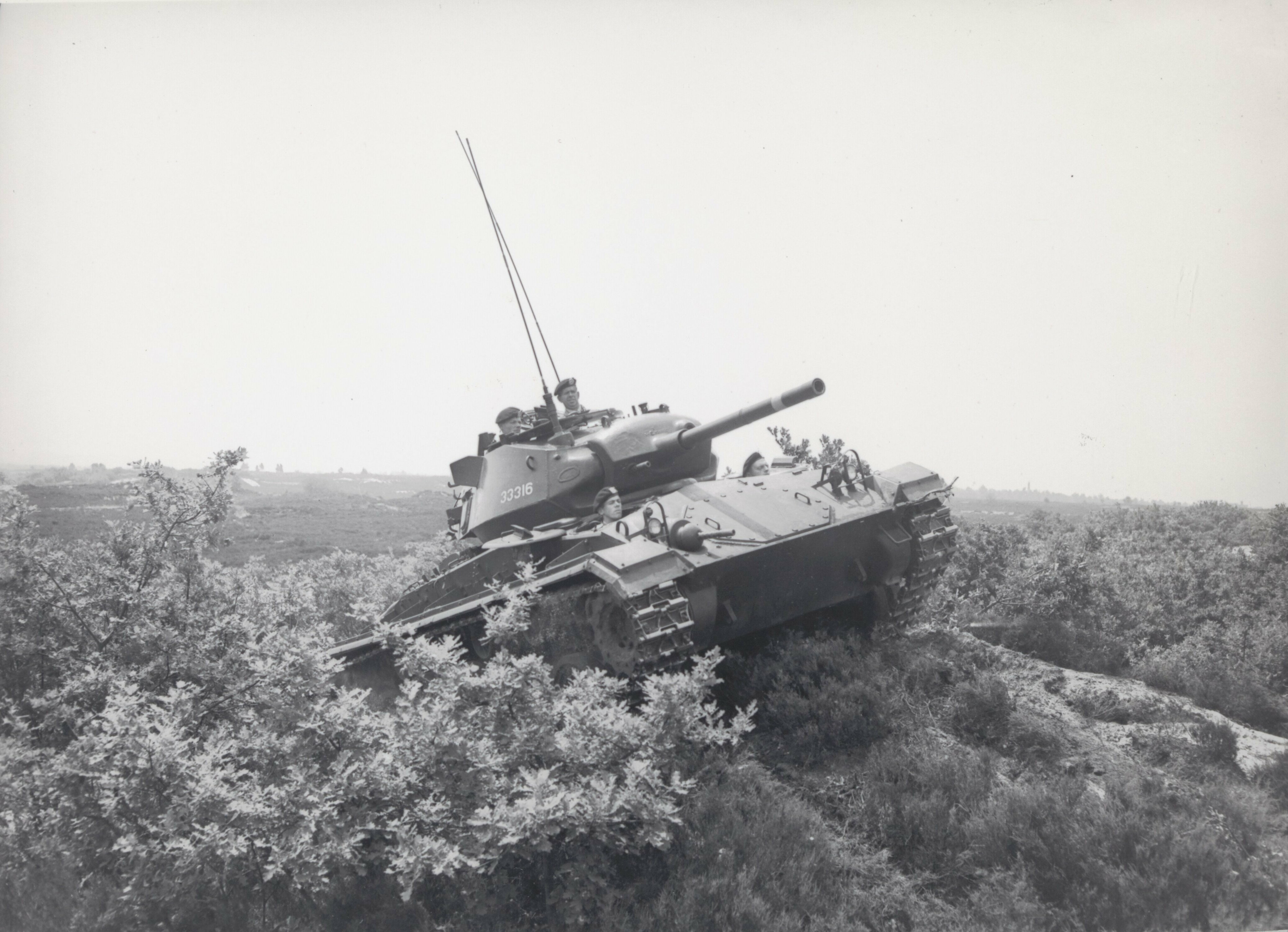
Several M-24 Chaffee tanks

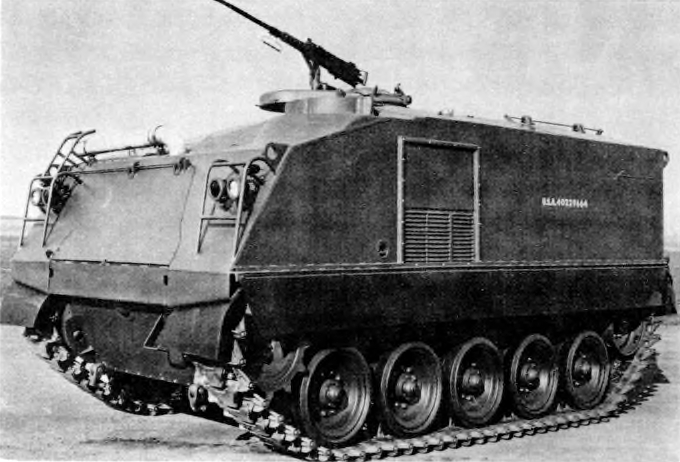
M75 armored personnel carriers

At the time of the war, the Ethiopian Air Force (EAF) was the only country in Sub-Saharan Africa to own and operate F-86 Sabre fighter jets.

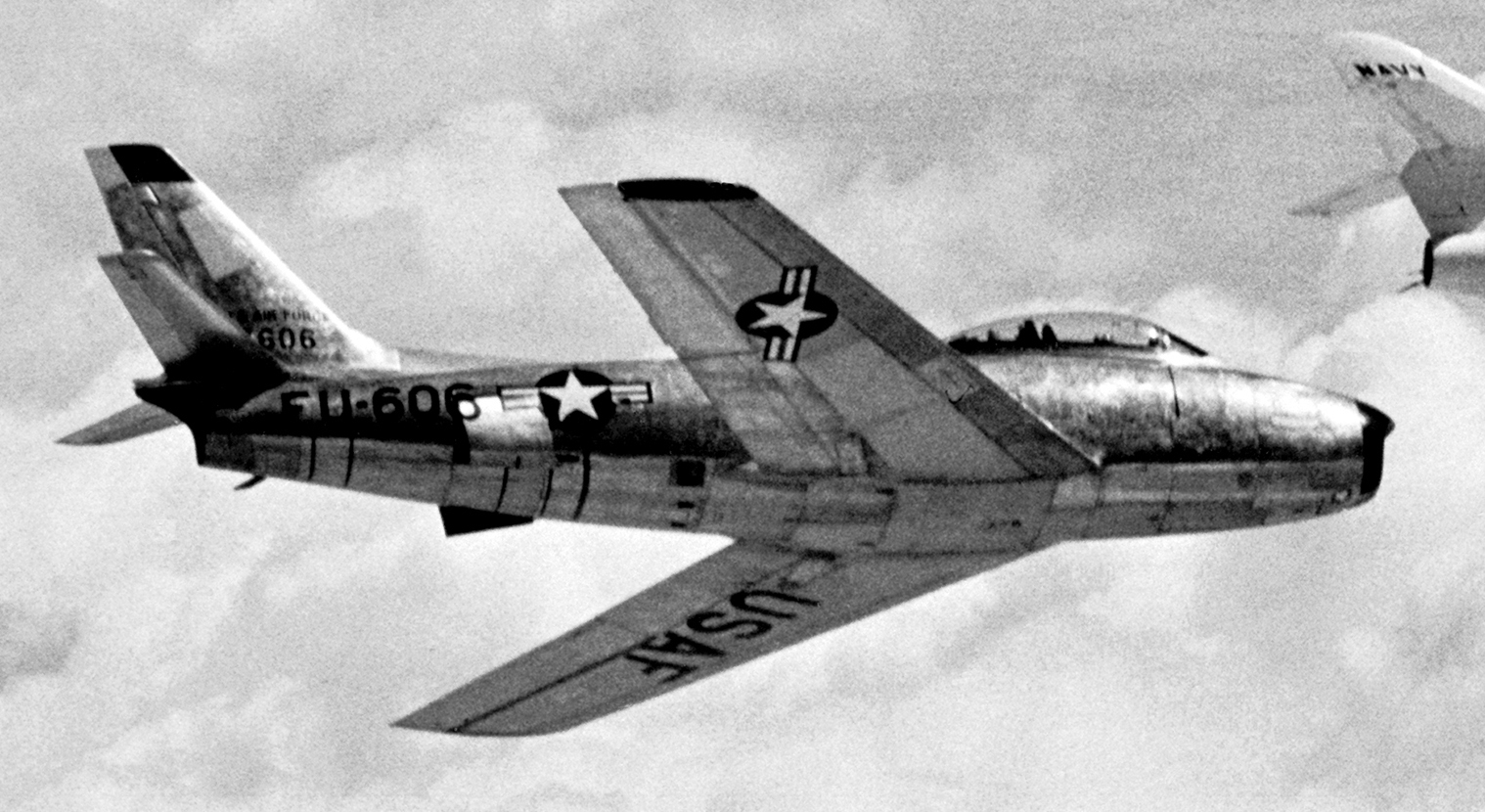
F-86 Sabre, extensively used by EAF for airstrikes and close air support

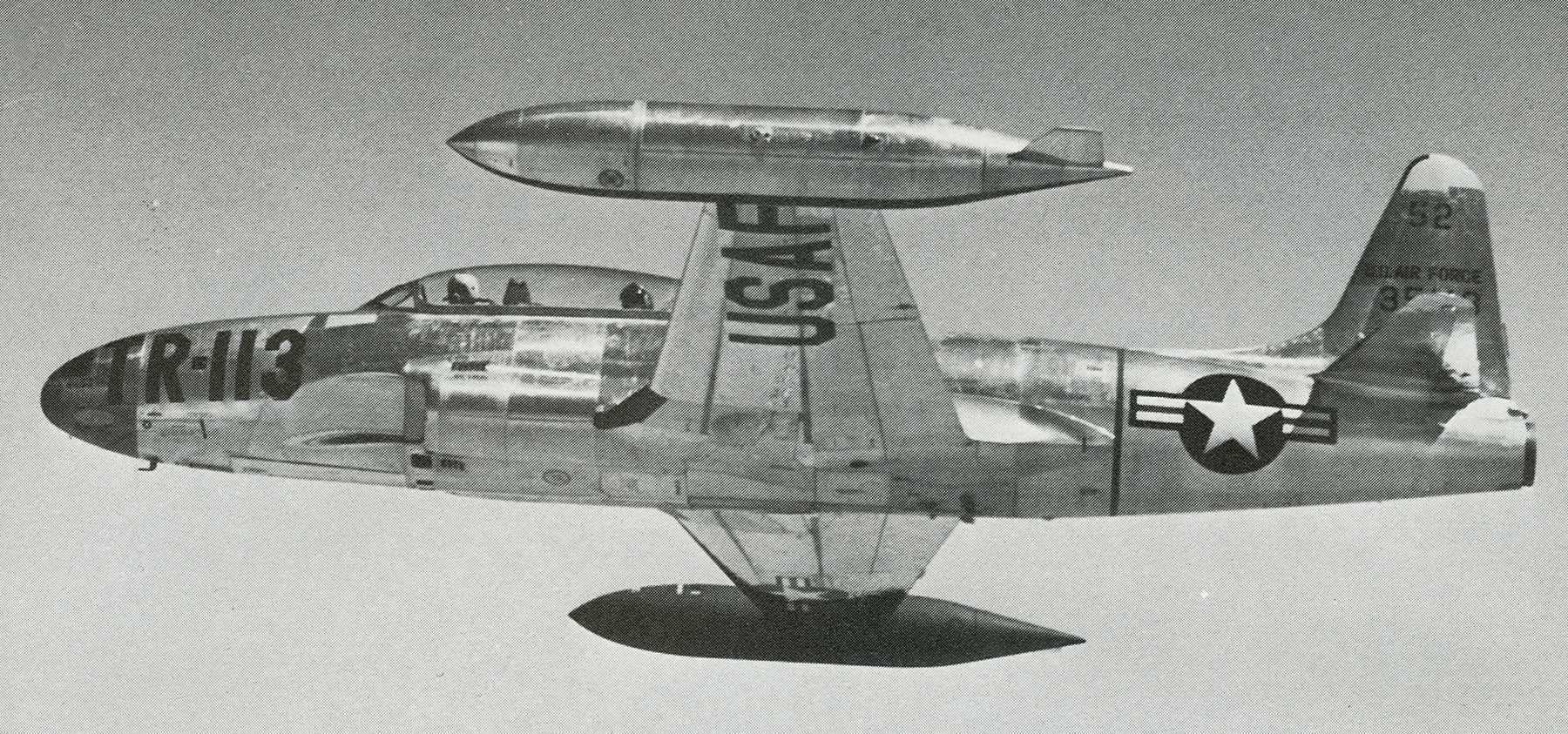
T-33 Shooting Star, utilized by EAF for demonstrations of force and aerial reconnaissance

== War ==
Starting around the 14 January 1964, tensions on the border began rapidly escalating. Both Ethiopia and Somalia claimed that the other had launched intrusions into their respective territory. The Ethiopians claimed that bandits armed by Somalia had assaulted a police convoy and station killing numerous personnel, while the Somalis counter charged the Ethiopians with violating Somali airspace and launching airstrikes.

On 15 January 1964, three Ethiopian aircraft bombed multiple Somali border police posts in the Upper Jubba River region. According to the Somali government, the Ethiopian Air Force launched a six-hour air attack on the border posts, totally destroying them. This prompted a diplomatic protest from Somali Foreign Minister Abdullah Issa to the Ethiopian Ambassador, Ato Ahadu Sabure. He warned that the Somali government would hold Ethiopia responsible for any consequences of "armed aggression and violation of national territory". The Ethiopian government refused to publicly acknowledge the Somali airstrike claim, but according to foreign correspondent Richard Boyce, sources close to Halie Selassie's inner circle privately confided that the airstrike had been ordered in response to guerrilla attacks on Ethiopian forces in the Ogaden earlier in the week.

On 17 January the Ethiopian Information Ministry announced that its security forces had killed dozens of "Somali bandits" in a border skirmish, while also seizing an SNA supply vehicle.

=== First Incursions ===
Accounts dispute who launched the first major incursion that sparked the war, but in mid to late January 1964, either Somali or Ethiopian army units crossed the opposing sides northern border in the Haud. The initiator of the conflict is unclear as no impartial third party observed the start of the conflict. Soon both sides had begun making military incursions into each other's respective territories.

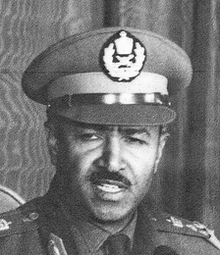
General Aman Andom, commander of the 3rd Division of the Ethiopian Imperial Army during the war

Numerous independent written accounts assert that the 3rd Infantry Division of the Ethiopian Imperial army, under the command of General Aman Andom, launched the initial major assault that sparked the war as a punitive response to Somali governments support for the Ogaden insurgency. British writer Noel Lytton noted that numerous foreign correspondents from the United States, the United Kingdom, France, Germany and Egypt who visited the battle area on the Somali side were convinced that Ethiopia had attacked Somalia. Lytton noted that most diplomatic observers in Mogadishu believed the assault was initiated by Ethiopia with the aim at bringing pressure on the Somali government to halt the insurgency in the Ogaden region. According to professor Harold G. Marcus, "The American-equipped Third Division moved into Ogaden in full strength and in mid-January 1964 attacked Somali border posts and adjacent towns to warn Mogadishu to cease supporting the rebels. Instead, the Somali government declared an emergency and moved its army to the frontier."

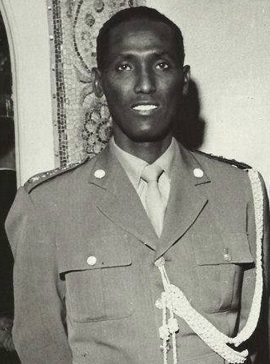
General Daud Abdulle Hirsi, commander of the Somali National Army during the war

According to other independent accounts, Somali government troops intervened in support of the Ogaden insurgents in January 1964. Haile Selassie's government claimed that 2,000 Somali troops had invaded with artillery support in order to put pressure on the 10 Ethiopian outposts along the northern frontier.

In the view of Professor Jules Davids, evidence indicated that the conflict had been initiated not by the Somali government but by the Ogaden insurgents, resulting in the Somali government being caught completely unprepared for a military engagement.

=== Escalation and states of emergency ===
On 4 February, Emperor Haile Selassie presided over and emergency meeting of his Cabinet—followed by a second on the 6th, after reports of large-scale incursion. It was reported over Addis Ababa radio that 30 Somalis had been killed out of 300 man force that had attempted to cross the border in Jigjiga Province.

According to Somali prime minister Abdirazak Haji Hussein, government officials across the country were summoned back to Mogadishu in early February after reports of a large scale incursion by the Ethiopian military on the northern frontier. In the view of the Somali government, the Ethiopian Empire's objective was to cut off the former British Somaliland from the south and induce a declaration of independence from the Somali Republic. Commenting on state of the Somali National Army at the start of the war Hussein wrote, "Our fragmentary army of not more than 5,000 men could not have been less prepared and equipped than it was then. The Soviet supplies had not yet reached us, and the only weapons we had for our forces were some World War II machine guns and artillery..."

==== Battle of Tog Wajaale/Togochale ====
On Friday, 7 February, the first serious fighting began when the two militaries clashed between the cities of Hargeisa and Jijiga along the northern Somali-Ethiopian frontier. On 8 February, after a lull in combat during the night in which the Ethiopians reinforced their positions, fighting flared again around the Somali frontier village of Tog Wajaale, in the north of the country. The Somalis reported that Ethiopian aircraft had strafed the village and at a news conference also claimed that Ethiopian troops had entered Somalia and clashed with Somali military, but that fighting had not spread beyond the area around Tog Wajaale. Much of the initial fighting was centred around the Haud region.

Both the Somali and Ethiopian governments invoked states of emergency following the clashes. The Ethiopian government accused Somalia of "expansionist programs", and Somali Foreign Ministry charged Ethiopia with "armed aggression against the Somali Republic." On the 9th of February, United Nations Secretary General, U Thant, sent an urgent appeal to both nations to immediately cease hostilities.

After two days of fighting, the border skirmish at Tog Wajaale began to assume serious proportions. Around February 10, the Ethiopians sent an airborne company, an infantry battalion, an artillery battery, and a mechanized platoon with M24 Chaffee tanks to Tog Wajale/Togochale, while the Somalis dispatched heavy artillery and tanks. Equipped primarily with F-86 Sabre's, the Ethiopian Air Force had complete air supremacy over its nearly nonexistent Somali counterpart as the Somali Air Force possessed few combat capable aircraft at the time. The Somali Air Force dispatched multiple De Havilland Vampire trainer jets it had previously received from Iraq to carry out combat air patrols, and Somali C-47 transport planes flew in two companies of troops into Tog Wajaale. During the battle Ethiopian F-86 Sabre jets carriedout heavy bombing raids and repeated strafing runs on hostile positions around the town. Eight Ethiopian tanks were reported to have been destroyed in the first two days fighting. The two sides became engaged in trench warfare less than 100 yards apart and during the fighting Somali mortars scored a direct strike on a munitions depot, destroying an Ethiopian military camp. In the initial clashes, the Ethiopians claimed to have killed 400 Somali troops and wounded 700, while reports of Ethiopian losses alleged that 350 had been killed, half by the munitions depot explosion. Heavy losses were incurred on both sides during the battle for the town, largely due to the heavy use of artillery and tanks.

During the clash Somali president Aden Abdullah Osman asserted at a press conference that Ethiopian forces were amassing along the entirety of the 900 km long Somali-Ethiopian border. It was sometime during this fighting when General Aman Micheal Andom had requested Emperor Haile Selassie for just 24 hours to try to march into the Somali capital of Mogadishu, and was rebuffed.

On Tuesday, February 11 head of the Soviet Union Nikita Khrushchev appealed to both the Somali and Ethiopian governments to resolve the dispute peacefully, and the Somali government went on to order an immediate cease-fire with the Ethiopians at Tog Wajaale. The USSR dispatched high-ranking diplomat Yakov Malik to convince the Ethiopian and Somali governments to halt the war.

=== Southern Clashes and Organization of African Unity Brokered Ceasefire Attempts ===
Despite the ceasefire at Tog Wajaale the day before, on the 12 February 1964, fighting continued and began spreading further south along the border, with the majority of combat taking place on the Somali side.

The Ethiopian Air Force began strikes across the southwestern frontier against the towns of Feerfeer and Galkacyo. The Somali Information Ministry claimed that the towns of Buuhoodle, Baledk, Haranka and Hididin had all been strafed by Ethiopian aircraft and further alleged that Feerfeer had been bombed for two hours, followed by two unsuccessful attacks by Ethiopian troops. Ethiopian forces claimed to have wiped out nine Somali army trucks packed with troops that night. That day both sides broadcast their perspectives on the reasons for the continuing conflict via radio:

Addis Abba Radio Service in Amharic broadcast 1100 GMT:

The Somali Republic is the only government which has entrenched in its constitution clauses providing tor expansion in an age when the destruction of European leaders who embarked on expansion is now remembered as a good salutary lesson...But the little Somali Republic adopted this policy of greater Somalia, which was first introduced by colonialists, three years ago. The only work of Abdirashids government since it formation has been to poison the minds of the people with this policy.

According to Abdirashid's plans and aims the answer is simple: They will take a third of Kenya, the whole of Djibouti, and, according to Mogadishu radio, all the Ethiopian territories east of Awash. It means that greater Somalia will be made up from the whole of these territories. Many people may laugh at this, but the fact that Abdirashid's regime takes it seriously should not be overlooked. The result has been that they have not made any development plans to improve the condition of the people, but rather embarked on building a strong army to perpetuate their term of office. Unemployment has increased and so have hardships.

The people started to murmur and showed signs of uprising; the result was the invasion of Ethiopia, Abdirashid's plan is to declare a state of emergency throughout the republic after invading Ethiopia and to get the opportunity to arrest and imprison his opponents and other peaceful leader of the people and annul the elections which are approaching. He is not worried about the losses which will be inflicted upon the people by the double blow which Ethiopia is dealing to see that her territorial sovereignty is respected. He does not care if Somalis are stopped from crossing into Ethiopia and he does not care if Somali soldiers are wiped out after entering Ethiopia. All selfish leaders do the same.

His Imperial Majesty has informed many government leaders and heads of state the conflict can cease only if Abdirashid abandons his expansionist policy; otherwise Ethiopia must ensure that her national sovereignty and dignity are respected. The consequent damage will not fall on Abdirashid and the leaders only, but all Somalis will regret and find it better. They could find a better alternative.

Radio Mogadishu in Somali broadcast 1010 GMT:

The Habesha have broken the agreement for the cessation of fighting on both sides of the frontier. At 0545 today, the Habesha army invaded the Somali police post at Feerfeer. The Somali police and military forces there opened fire in retaliation at the invading Habesha troops. The fighting at Feerfeer is reported to be continuing.

Yesterday the Somali Government acted in compliance with the request of the UN Secretary General and world leaders that the border fighting should cease. However, the Habesha army renewed the fighting at the village of Abdulkadir on the Somali border at Dabegorayaleh and Ina Guha. Before the invasion of Feerfeer by the Habesha army Addis Abba radio said this morning that fighting was continuing at Feerfeer. This proves that Addis Ababa radio knew the areas to be attacked by the Habesha army before the fighting. However, the Somali police and army gallantly defeated the Habesha enemy army in the invaded areas.

To date, the Somali republican force has been winning in all encounters. In all engagements, the Habesha army has been crippled and those who survived have taken to their heels. The Somali Government has informed the UN Secretary General, the OAU, and African heads of state about the fresh fighting brought by the Habesha army to the territory of the Somali Republic. The Somali Government has asked the United Nations and the OAU to send an impartial commission to the scene of the fighting end see for themselves how the Habesha army is annihilating the Somali civilian population, livestock, women and children.

The Somali army is confident that it will defend the motherland from the enemy and that the enemy will never set foot in it, The Somali people; civilians and not soldier or policemen, have been reported to have started fighting at several eras against the Habesha army and that many towns have been captured from the Habesha army. Many Habesha troops have been killed there. The Habesha army is carrying a chip on its shoulder.

On 13 February, the United States publicly urged Somalia and Ethiopia to cease fighting. The U.S. State Department commented that it was deeply disturbed by the clashes. Follow a three-day emergency summit, on February 14 the Organization of African Unity called for an immediate ceasefire to Ethiopian-Somali border war. The OAU also requested both Ethiopia and Somalia halt "provocative and insulting" propaganda campaigns against each other. Both Ethiopian and Somali delegates immediately pledged that they would abide by the decision. In Ethiopia, this manifested as war rallies held in cities and villages throughout country, encouraged by government propagandists, that displayed banners declaring, "We will march to Mogadishu," and Somalia as radio broadcast condemning Ethiopia imperialism.

On 15 February, the Somali government accused Ethiopia of attacking frontier posts and shelling villages, despite the cease-fire which was to begin at noon, and claimed that 117 civilian had been killed in air strikes on 12 different villages. The Ethiopians counter accused the Somalis of raids into Ethiopia backed by artillery just before the noon deadline. On Monday, 17 February, the ceasefire appeared to hold and Premier Abdirashid Ali Shermarke of Somalia reported at a news conference the Ethiopian frontier had been quiet for the day. Soon after, the truce broke and fighting continued. Another OAU ceasefire was attempted in early March but also collapsed after two days.

In late February, presidents Kwame Nkrumah of Ghana and Julius Nyerere of Tanzania both suggested the establishment of a peacekeeping forces to patrol the disputed region. Somali president Aden Abdullah Osman publicly agree with the proposal on 22 February.

Heavy fighting was reported across the border on 6 March 1964. Soon after Somalia declared a general mobilization.

=== Final Clashes and Truce ===
In mid-March 1964, Somalia and Ethiopia once again opened negotiations in Khartoum, Sudan, in an effort to resolve their border war at the request of numerous African heads of state.

While negotiations were ongoing in Khartoum sharp fighting resumed on 26 March 1964 around four northwestern Somali border posts—Daba Goriale, Durukhsi, Inia Guha and Abdulkadir. The Somalis charged the Ethiopians with attacking the outposts with airstrikes and artillery, while the Ethiopians countered that Somali troops had launched an attack, killing several of its troops. The Somali Air Force dispatched Douglas DC-3 transport aircraft to carry out aerial reconnaissance along the border between the town of Yeed and the city of Beledweyne.

The next day, the Somali government further claimed that Ethiopian troops had become engaged in combat with civilians and soldiers in the border village of Habas, and warned that the renewed fighting jeopardized the Khartoum talks. The Ethiopian Defense Ministry reported that the Somali military, supported by tanks and artillery, had been repulsed and that eight Ethiopians and twenty six Somalis were killed, with one Somali tank reported destroyed and another captured. The Somali government claimed that numerous Ethiopian armored vehicles and a military camp had been destroyed. During the fighting Ogaden insurgents assisted the Somali army by severing supply lines and assaulting Ethiopian military units to the rear of the front line.

==== March 1964 Elections and Final Ceasefire ====
Despite accusations from Ethiopia that Somali Premier Shermarke was using the conflict in order to hold on to power, the 1964 Somali Elections that were due to take place 30 March 1964 were not postponed. Premier Abdirashid Ali Shermarke in national address urged Somalis to, "hold the rifle in one hand and vote with the other". The speech and his conduct during the conflict was popular with the Somali public and his party, the Somali Youth League, went on to win 69 of 123 seats in the National Assembly.

On 30 March 1964, four Ethiopian aircraft bombed Hargeisa, the second largest city in Somalia three times and Radio Mogadishu claimed that equipment captured during fighting included two trucks given to Ethiopia under an American aid program, identifiable by the clasped-hands symbol of the program. The spokesman for Ethiopian Information Ministry announced on Addis radio that the government "categorically denied" bombing Haregisa and described the Somali claims to the contrary as false and unfounded.

Somalia and Ethiopia agreed to a final cease-fire on 30 March 1964, and fighting completely subsided several days later. Sudanese President Ibrahim Abboud has been credited with bringing about the cease-fire. The final clashes during the last week of the conflict was centered on the town of Dolow, where the borders of Ethiopia, Somalia and Kenya meet. Hostilities came to end on 2 April 1964.

On 8 April Ethiopia announced it had withdrawn all its troops from the border area in dispute with Somalia and a delegation met with Somali officials to start a peacekeeping operation in the region. On 18 April 1964, a joint Ethiopian-Somali commission completed supervision troops withdrawals from the southern border area and moved to do the same in the north. Over the next few months, Somali - Ethiopian relations warmed, and the two sides signed an accord in Khartoum, Sudan, agreeing to withdraw their troops from the border, cease hostile propaganda, and start peace negotiations. A demilitarized zone between six and ten miles deep on both sides of the border was demarcated.

== Foreign Support ==
=== Aid to Ethiopia ===
In mid-February, US Air Force transport aircraft flying out from West Germany delivered plane loads of both arms and ammunition to aid the Ethiopian army. US military assistance during the conflict included deployment of US army combat training teams and the construction of an air base close to the Somali border. The United States abandoned its usual position of neutrality in the Ethiopia-Somali dispute soon after fighting in the Ogaden erupted into a full-scale border war in February and sided with Ethiopia. The Johnson administration had at first attempted to be to be impartial but as the fighting continued, carried out emergency military airlifts and deployed combat training teams with Ethiopian forces. Notably, after the Ethiopians had reportedly inflicted serious damage on Somali forces, Washington threatened to cut off all military aid to Addis Ababa in order to deter the Ethiopian generals who wanted to, "teach the Somalis a lesson" and attempt to push all the way to the Somali capital of Mogadishu. The scale of American support to Ethiopia was significant enough that the U.S. embassy in Mogadishu sent a cable cautioning Washington that if the full extent of American involvement in the conflict was discovered, there would be a serious political fallout with Somalia.

The Somali Defence Ministry alleged that British troops and planes fought on Ethiopia's side, and that seven trucks loaded with British soldiers arrived from Kenya at Dolo. The Ethiopian government denied receiving aid from Britain or elsewhere. Several weeks into the war, a government spokesman announced on Addis Abba radio that Ethiopia had neither sought or received any foreign assistance.

=== Aid to Somalia ===
Egypt delivered plane loads of ammunition and infantry rifles to the Somali Republic on the orders of President Gamal Abdel Nasser, after he received news about the dire equipment situation of the Somali National Army. Most notably, they delivered the semi-automatic Hakim rifle (Somali: Xakiim), which played a critical role given that the SNA only had an estimated 2,500 infantry rifles at the onset of the war. This supply of rifles was therefore crucial for maintaining combat operations. Notably, Cairo was hesitant to extend further military support to Somalia beyond what was considered necessary. This reluctance was due to the perception of the conflict as a drain on Egypt's significant military commitments in the North Yemen Civil War. The Soviet Union's cautious approach to the conflict despite US support for Ethiopia had deeply disappointed the Somali government.

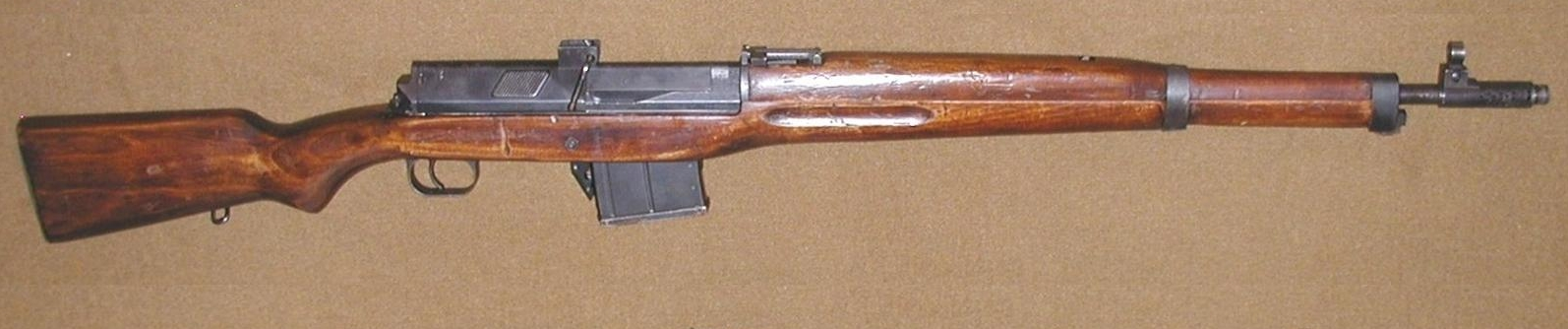
The Hakim rifle, provided by Egypt to the Somali Republic via airlift during the war

Ethiopian authorities alleged Somalia was receiving outside military help, though did not specify who from, only mentioning that it was from non-Africans.

== Outcome ==
=== Result ===
Despite perceptions in Somalia and Ethiopia that the 1964 war resulted in respective victories, numerous independent military analysts and observers have concluded that the result of war was inconclusive with no decisive victor. Both nations armed forces had launched intrusions into the others territory at some point during the conflict, only to be chased back across the border.

==== Somalia ====
In Somalia the conflict is considered a triumph, as the war is viewed as a victory by a poorly equipped and inexperienced military against a numerically superior aggressor through the successful defence of the Somali frontier. The Somali National Army enjoyed a high degree of popularity in Somalia after the war and the date of the conflicts definitive end, 2 April, would be chosen as SNA day soon after. The war increased the Somali government's emphasis on national security and military concerns in the years following. In the view of former Somali prime minister Abdirazak Haji Hussein, despite success on by the SNA on the front line, dwindling reserves of military supplies and equipment had become a dire issue by late March 1964. The desperate logistical situation was so severe that it threatened the SNA's combat capacity, prompting many within the Somali government to worry that a potential extended conflict would risk military disaster.

Despite the positive perception of the war's outcome, the conflict also had grave consequences for the Somali Republic according to prime minister Hussein. A refugee crisis from the Ogaden began, internal displacement had become an issue in the former conflict zones along the frontier and significant military casualties had been incurred during the later stages of the conflict, largely due to Ethiopian air supremacy. Land mines placed during the war has resulted in significant unexploded ordnance contamination around former battlefields.

==== Ethiopia ====
In Ethiopia the conflict is considered a triumph, as the war is viewed as a victory against an expansionist aggression by the Somali government which was successfully repelled. Though in their view victorious, Emperor Halie Selassie and Ethiopian military high command were reportedly disturbed by the Imperial army's substandard performance against poorly equipped insurgents in the Ogaden and the Somali National Army. According to Professor Harold G. Marcus, "Initially, the Somalis did well against the Ethiopians, but advantages in numbers and especially in air power won the day for Addis Abba...The imperial high command was nonetheless plunged into gloom, first by the successes of the guerrillas and, second, by the poor performance of the army." In direct response to the lackluster performance of the army during the opening stage of the war Defence Minister General Merid Mengesha immediately requested emergency military equipment from the U.S. government. Seeking the avoid an arms race in the Horn of Africa, the United States was slow to respond to Ethiopian military aid requests, until General Merid threatened to seek aid from the USSR. Following the war the United States began increasing military aid to Ethiopia.

It was reported that combat performance during the counterinsurgency effort and subsequent border war threatened Emperor Haile Selassie's reign with a possible military coup. As a result of the war, modernization and urgent reorganizations were made in the Ethiopian army, including the retirement of over 2,000 mostly elderly military personnel. During the conflict the US Department of State was repeatedly and urgently warned by the US embassy in Addis Abba of the serious implications the Ogaden crisis had for Haile Selassie's tenure as Emperor. Selassie's handling of the conflict, along with significant financial expenses caused by the war, contributed to the discontent within the military that later resulted in the Emperor's overthrow a decade later in 1974.

== Aftermath ==
=== Ogaden Somalis ===
It was widely recognized during the Khartoum negotiations that any peace accord with the Somali government would not halt the Ogaden insurgency and numerous international observers professed the belief that no genuine lasting progress could be made unless a degree of recognition was given to the nature of the Ogaden liberation movement, which many regarded by many as a genuine independence movement. These concerns were confirmed following signing of the peace accord between Somalia and Ethiopia, when leader of the Ogaden insurgency Muktal Dahir declared he would ignore the truce, stating:

"My people are under no one's jurisdiction and take orders from no one but me. We have no intention of observing any cease-fire. Our fight with Ethiopia has nothing to do with Somalia. We are indifferent to the government position, though we still expect and hope our movement will be recognized both by Somalia and by the world."

After the war the Ethiopian military once again began taking punitive measures against the Somalis of the Ogaden. In May and July 1964, over 22,000 domestic animals were either killed or confiscated by Ethiopian troops, devastating Somali nomads' most precious source of income, resulting in what amounted to economic warfare on the nomadic way of life. The Ethiopian government also introduced a new policy of land registration to encourage Amhara farmers to resettle in the valuable pastureland's in and around the Ogaden that were used by Somali nomads' herds as grazing areas. Under the new laws, nomads had no recognized claim to these territory and were harassed by the military as a result. Wells frequented by Somali nomads were poisoned, and new ones were created for the incoming migration of Amhara farmers. For nearly a year after the war, most major Somali towns in the Ogaden were under military administration and curfew.

=== Operation Mäbräq (Operation Lightning) ===
Ethiopian officials prepared a plan in late 1964 called Operation Mäbräq (Operation Lightning). Concealed in total secrecy, the operation planned out the destruction of Somalia's military capacity and detailed an occupation of the former British Somaliland, to be invoked in the event of a Somali invasion. Two years later, another pair of similar operations, Wall and Bunker, were drafted.

=== International response ===
The border war led to the Organisation of African Unity passing the Cairo declaration in July 1964, which called on all member states to respect existing colonial borders. Most members of the OAU were alienated by idea Somali irredentism and feared that if a Greater Somalia project was successful, the example might inspire their own ethnic minorities divided by colonial borders to agitate for secession. Somalia dissented from the OAU's affirmation of present borders, and continue to agitate for a unification referendum in the Ogaden. The Somali government declared the July resolution unacceptable on the grounds that it conflicted with UN resolution 1514, which declared self-determination as a universal principle and not merely a concept of colonial applicability.

Ethiopia and Kenya concluded a mutual defense pact in 1964 in response to what both countries perceived to be the continuing threat from Somalia. Following the war, American policy in the Horn of Africa became less impartial and more openly pro Ethiopian.

== See also ==
- Ogaden War of 1977–1978
- Ethiopian–Somali Border War of 1982
- War in Somalia (2006–2009)
