= Rebecca Richards =

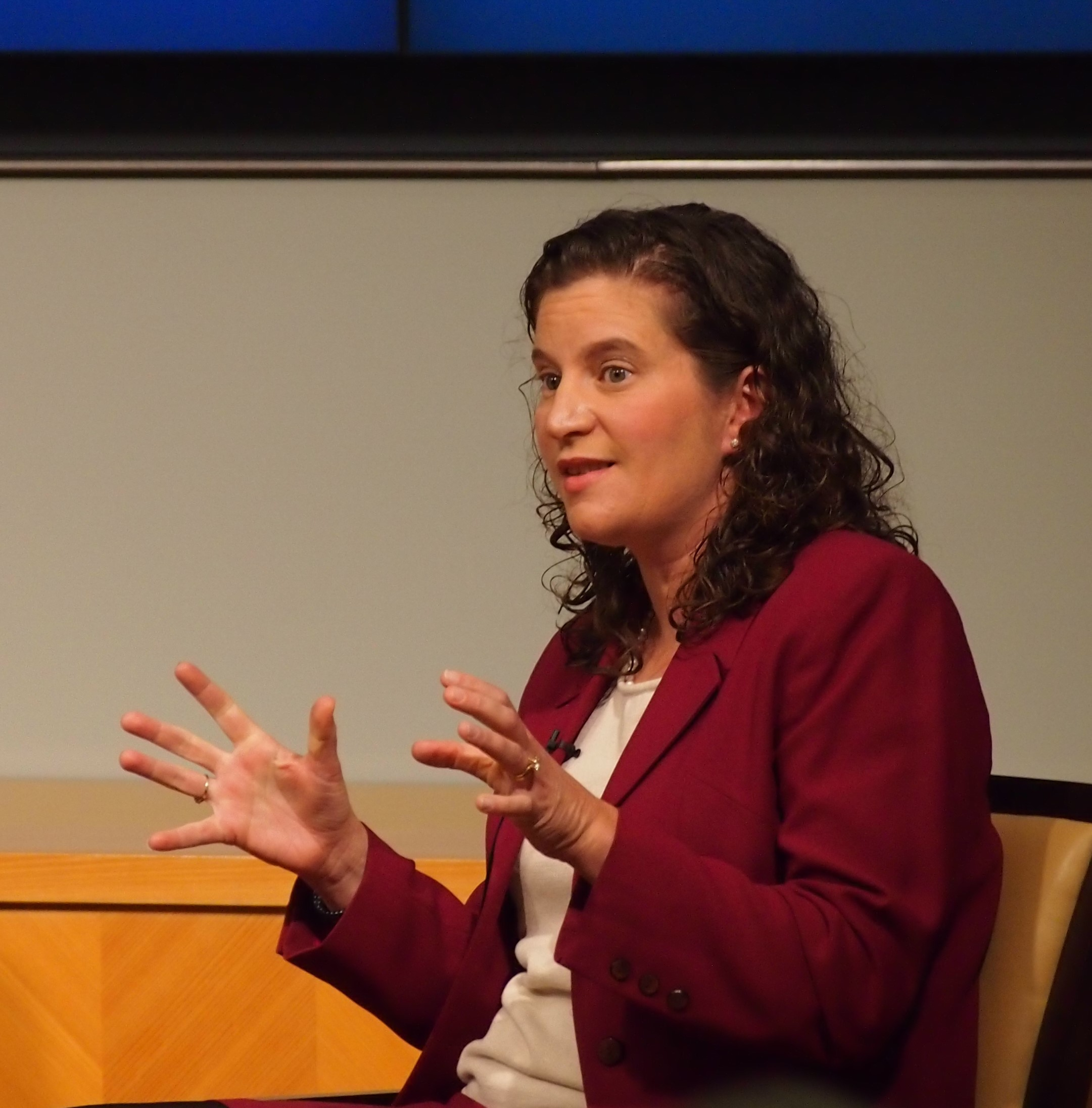
- at CATO Surveillance Conference, 2015

1st Civil Liberties and Privacy Officer of the National Security Agency
- Incumbent
- Assumed office 29 January 2014

Personal details
- Education: George Washington University

Rebecca Richards is the Civil Liberties and Privacy Officer at the National Security Agency.

She graduated from George Washington University. She was Senior Director for Privacy Compliance at the Department of Homeland Security. She worked on the US-EU Safe Harbor accord.
