= Haranka =

- Town
- Location within the Somalia
- Coordinates: 0°47′N 43°23′E
- Country: Somalia
- Region: Middle Juba

Government
  - Control: Al-Shabaab
- Time zone: UTC+3 (EAT)

Haranka (Somali: Xaranka) is a small town in the southern Middle Juba (Jubbada Dhexe) region of Somalia. It is located very close to the Indian Ocean and the Juba river.

== History ==
Haramka is an old settlement. It is believed to have been founded centuries ago.

== Overview ==
The city is situated on the main road between Mogadishu and Kismayo, near Barawa and about 50 miles northeast of Jilib.

== Economy ==
The Somali Fruit Company is based in the town.

== Education ==
Haramka has one primary school.
