= Siyara =

Siyara Siyaara
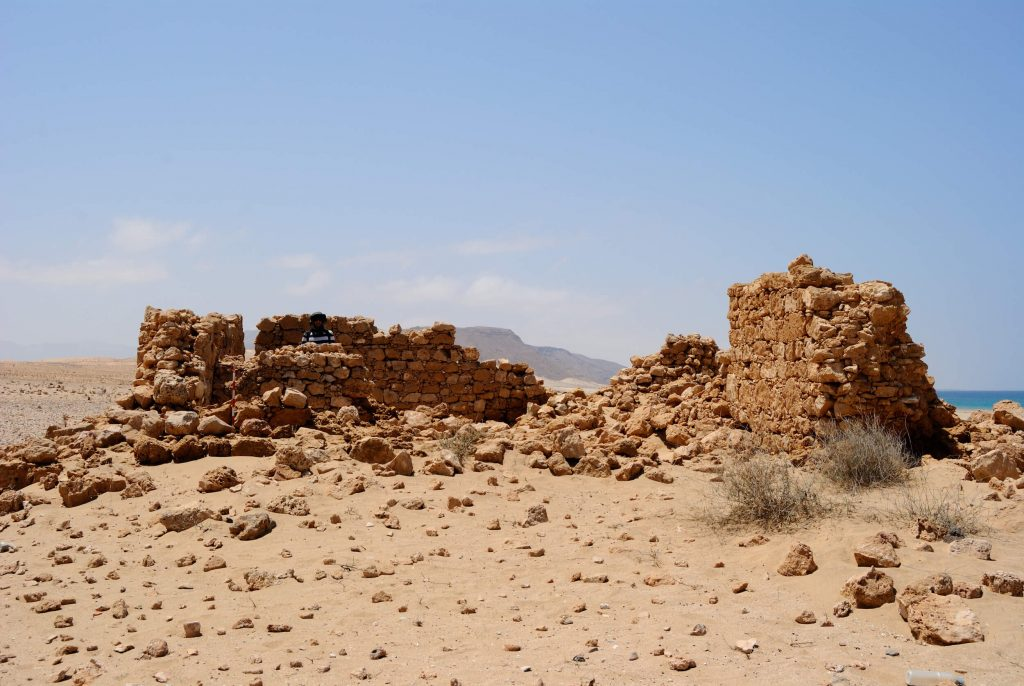
- Dilapidated remains of Siyara's fort

- Location in Somaliland Siyara (Somaliland)
- Coordinates: 10°36′10″N 45°16′31″E
- Country: Somaliland
- Region: Sahil
- District: Berbera District
- Time zone: UTC+3 (EAT)

Siyara (Somali: Siyaara) was a historic coastal settlement and fort located in the Sahil region of Somaliland. It served as the first capital of the Adal Sultanate following the Muslim resurgence spearheaded by Sabr ad-Din II.

== Etymology ==
The name of Siyara derives from the Somali word Siyaaro, a term used to describe a localized annual pilgrimage to a holy site where the ancestor of a clan or a saint is buried. The Somali word ultimately derives from the Arabic word of the same meaning: ziyārah (زيارة).

== History ==
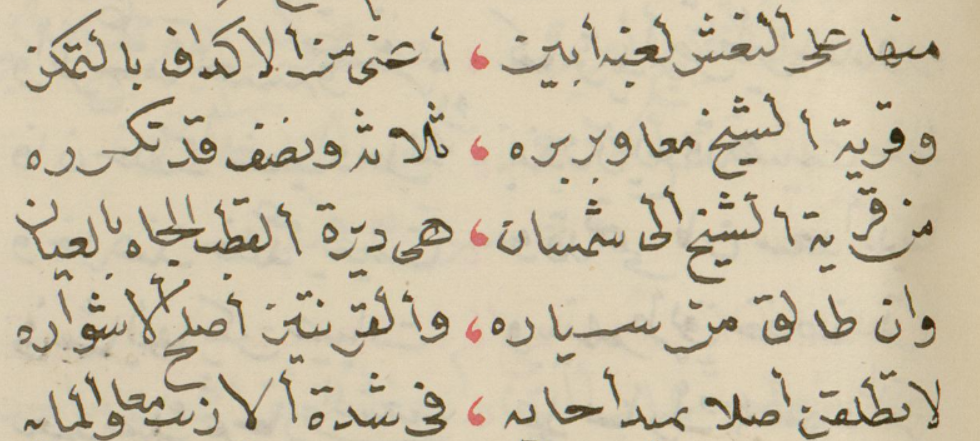
Ibn Majid's notes on Siyara, El-Sheikh and Berbera

=== Medieval ===
Siyara was the site of the return of the Walashma dynasty. Sa'ad ad-Din II the last Sultan of Ifat had been slain in Zeila after losing the city to Emperor Dawit I after a siege. His sons had fled to Yemen and would soon return led by Sultan Sabr ad-Din II. Sabr crossed the Gulf of Aden and established a base in Siyara. At Siyara many of the former followers of Saad Ad Din regrouped and joined Sabr Ad Din. Despite his army's smaller size, he was able to defeat his Ethiopian opponents in battles at Serjan and Zikr Amhara (Memory of the Amhara) and consequently pillaged the surrounding areas. As a result, Emperor Yeshaq I sent to the region the Ethiopian general Najt Bakal who had under him 10 chiefs, each the head of 20,000 soldiers. The new invigorated kingdom led by the Walashama would be called the Sultanate of Adal. The Adalites fled from this initial Ethiopian push, which then occupied the region for a year. Sabr ad-Din sent his brother Muhammad, aided by the Christian apostate and Ethiopian defector Harb Jaush, defeated Najt Bakal's forces in Retwa, resulting in the general's death, along with many soldiers and Christian leaders. Sabr ad-Din II pillaged the region and was able to defeat Yeshaq's imperial headquarters in Adal and retired to his capital, while instructing his followers and commanders to continue to fight. He entrusted his brother Muhammad with taking an imperial fort at Barut and ordered his commander Umar to take Jab from the Christians. However, the region was well defended by numerous imperial soldiers and the attack was a failure, resulting in the deaths of all of Umar's men, according to Al-Maqrizi. Sabr ad-Din barely escaped capture due to the speed of his horse, but died soon after of a natural death in 1422–3.

Legendary 15th century Arab explorer Ahmad ibn Mājid wrote of Siyara and several other notable landmarks and ports of the northern Somali coast, including Berbera, the Sa'ad ad-Din islands (aka the Zeila Archipelago near Zeila), Alula, Ruguda, Maydh, Heis, El-Darad and El-Sheikh.

=== Early Modern ===
In early modern times Siyara was a seasonal trading post located some 30 km east of Berbera, where the local Makahil branch of the Sa’ad Musa, Habr Awal operated a fort there and derived a regular revenue from ships calling at Siyara to replenish their fresh water reserves on the way to the Berbera trading fair:

Siyareh, a fort and small village belonging to the Makahil branch of the Habr Awal, is the watering-place of Berbera, and derives a small revenue from the boats which touch there en route to, and returning from, the Berbera fair.

In the year 1845, Sharmarke Ali Saleh – who was by then the Governor of Zeila – chartered four Somali ships from Siyara with men and building material for the erection of his tower forts to solidify his takeover of Berbera, which lasted from 1845 to 1852.

The Habr Awal massacre of Richard Burton's travel party and death of a number of British officers in 1854 led the Royal Navy to blockade the Habr Awal coast. The blockade was established from Mount Almis/El-Sheikh to Siyara, which adversely affected trade in Berbera and Bulhar. A settlement was finally reached in 1856 that allowed trade to continue moving again. In 1869 the Royal Navy was enforcing a ban on slave trading in the Gulf of Aden and intercepted over 100 Galla slaves that were illegally shipped to Aden from Berbera. Soon after more slaves were discovered at Siyara and Lieutenant Colonel Playfair with the steamer 'Lady Canning' implored the Makahil elders to surrender the slaves. Upon their refusal the Lady Canning would open fire shooting deliberately near the important fort of Siyara. This act of intimidation led the elders to oblige and free the slaves held in the area.

The port town was later on described as being under the possession of the Habr Je'lo:

“The last branch of the Western tribes is the Haber el Jahleh, who possess the sea-ports from Seyareh to the ruined village of Rukudah, and as far as the town of Heis. Of these towns, Kurrum is the most important, from its possessing a tolerable harbour, and from its being the nearest point from Aden, the course to which place is N.N.W., consequently the wind is fair, and the boats laden with sheep for the Aden market pass but one night at sea, whilst those from Berbera are generally three. What greatly enhances the value of Kurrum however is its proximity to the country of the Dulbahanta, who approach within four days of Kurrum, and who therefore naturally have their chief trade through that port.

== Archaeology ==
In 2016 and again in 2020, the Incipit (Instituto de Ciencias del Patrimonio) Spanish-lead archaeological team surveyed the site of Siyara and made a number of new archeological finds, including stone buildings made of coral masonry and several hundred Muslim burial graves and tumuli. The team also uncovered amounts of imported and local potteries, glass, stone vessels and accumulations of bones and ashes (which indicates large feasts and gatherings).

== Demographics ==
According to a book published in the UK in 1951, there was a home well belonging to the Yasif branch of the Habr Je'lo clan, Mohamed Ahmed branch of the Ahmed Farah branch of the Habr Je'lo clan.

== See also ==
- Karin
- Berbera
- El-Sheikh
- Heis
- Maydh
