= El-Darad =

El-Darad Ceel Daraad
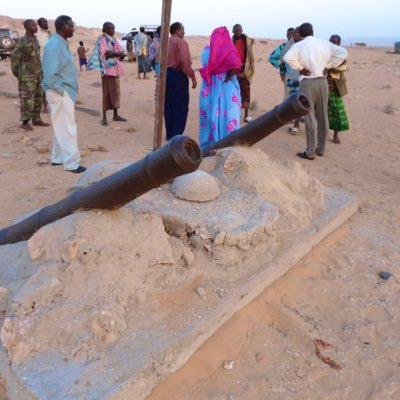
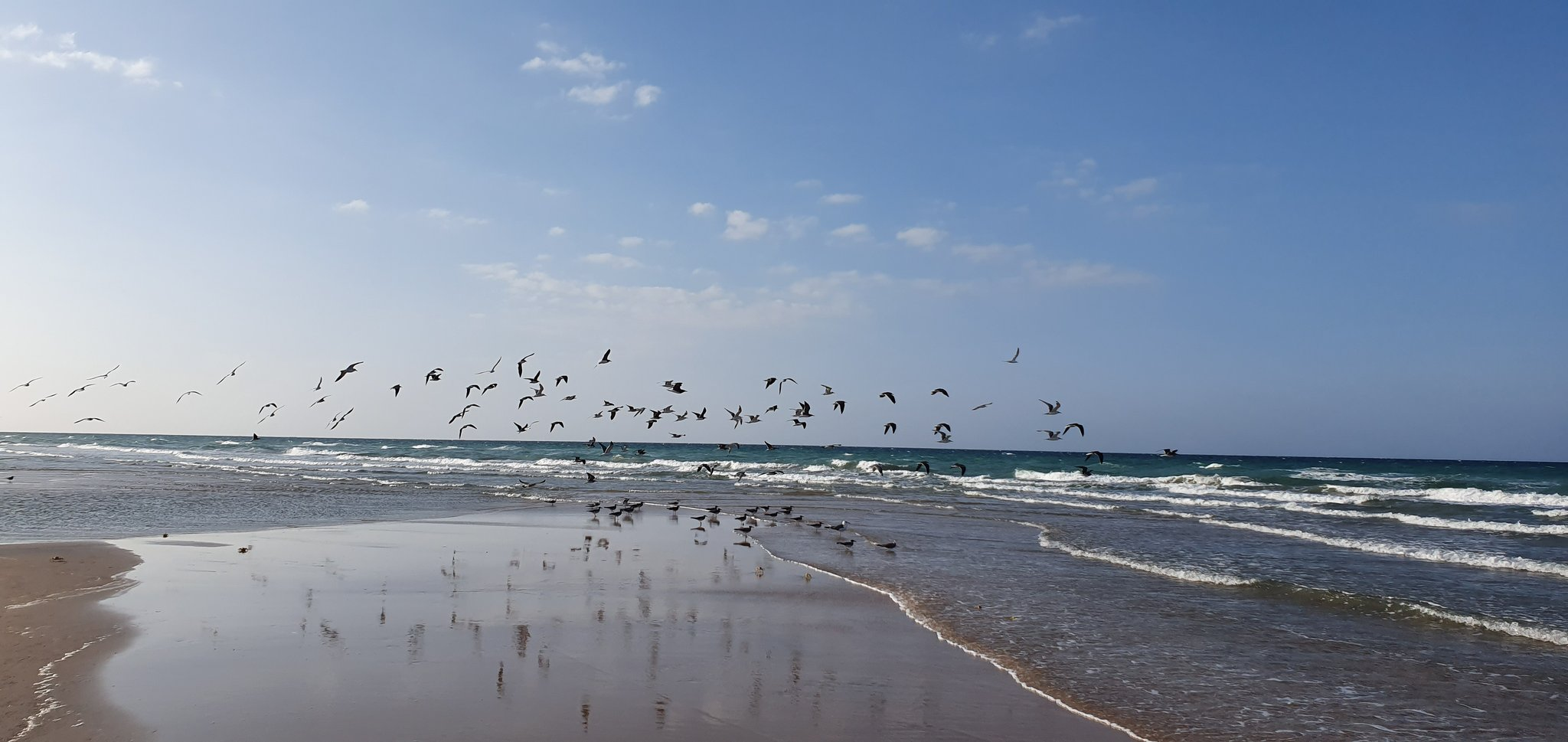
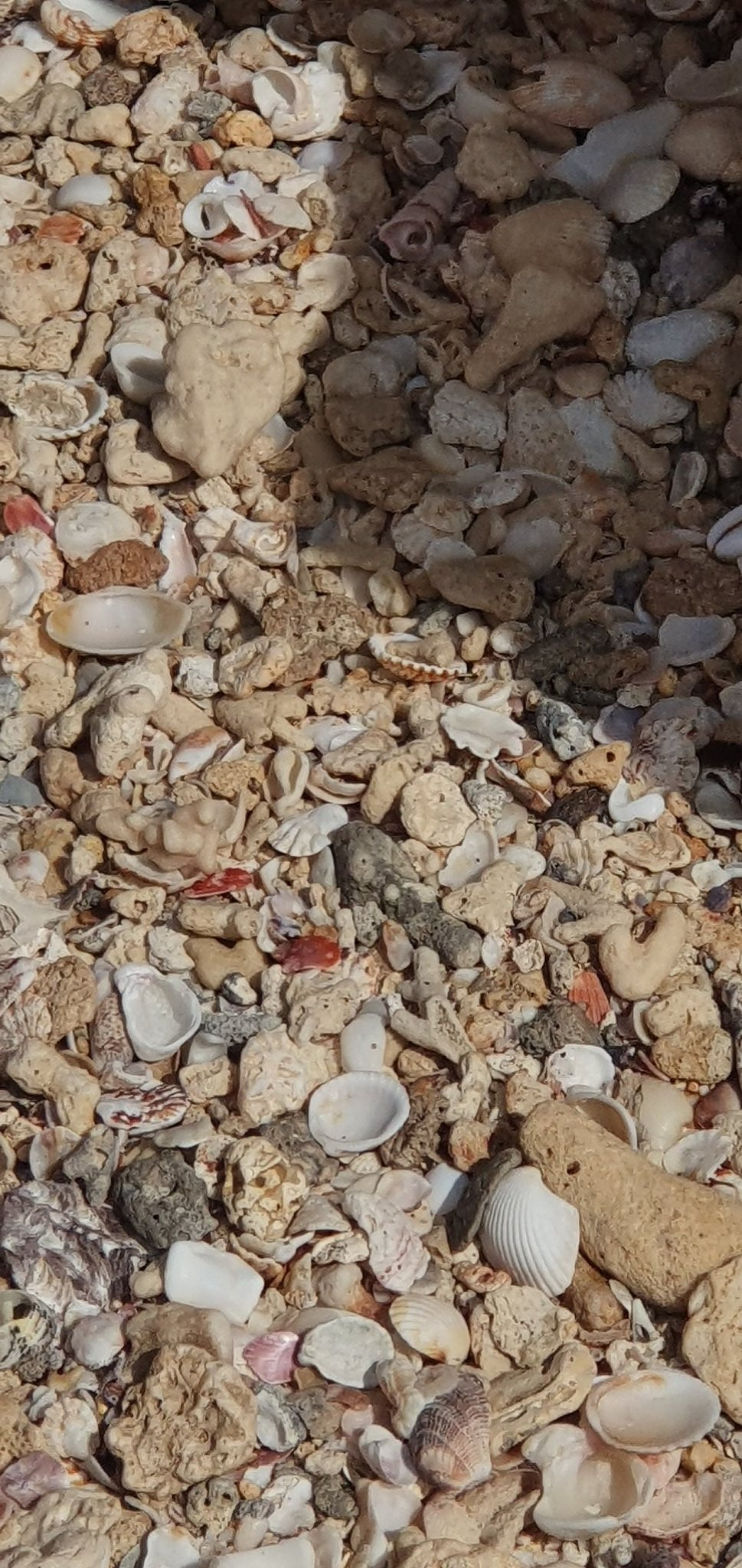
- Sharmarke Ali Saleh's cannons deposited at El-Darad, El-Darad beach, El-Darad archaeological sites

- Location in Somaliland El-Darad (Somaliland)
- Coordinates: 10°45′40.9″N 45°34′42.6″E
- Country: Somaliland
- Region: Sahil
- District: Berbera District
- Time zone: UTC+3 (EAT)

El-Darad (Somali: Ceel Daraad), historically known as Ain-Tarad is a historic coastal settlement and port located in the Sahil region of Somaliland.

== History ==
Legendary 15th century Arab explorer Ahmad ibn Mājid wrote of El-Darad and several other notable landmarks and ports of the northern Somali coast, including Berbera, the Sa'ad ad-Din islands (aka the Zeila Archipelago near Zeila), Alula, Ruguda, Maydh, Heis, Siyara and El-Sheikh.

In the 19th century, El-Darad was a seasonal coastal trading settlement with a fort made of adobe (earth) and stone masonry, which was surrounded by Somali Aqal and Areesh (traditional nomadic and coastal dwellings respectively). The fort was erected in circa 1826 and was owned by Muhammad Diban, a Habr Je'lo (Adan Madobe) pirate and slave trader based in El-Darad who garrisoned the fort with slaves armed with matchlock rifles. Muhammad Diban also had cordial relations with Sharmarke Ali Saleh – governor and ruler of Zeila, Berbera and Tadjoura – who provided Muhammad with five cannons after Sharmarke lost control of Berbera in 1852.

The town today is inhabited by the Faahiye Xassan Sub-division of the Aadan Madoobe and the Ahmed Farah Sub-division of the Nuux Maxamed who both belong to the Habr Je'lo Clan family.

== See also ==
- Administrative divisions of Somaliland
- Regions of Somaliland
- Districts of Somaliland
- Somalia–Somaliland border
