= Ruguda =

Ruguda Ruguuda
- Town
- Location in Somaliland Ruguda (Somaliland)
- Coordinates: 10°51′0″N 46°50′54″E
- Country: Somaliland
- Region: Sanaag
- District: El Afweyn District
- Time zone: UTC+3 (EAT)

Ruguda, also known as Rakudah (Somali: Ruguuda) is a historic coastal port town located in the Sanaag region of Somaliland, near Heis.

== Overview ==
Ruguda is a coastal town approximately 38 km away from the larger Heis town nearby. Other nearby cities and towns include Erigavo (134 km), Burao (389 km), and Xagal (108 km).

== History ==
Ruguda was a well known landmark to navigators and legendary Arab explorer Ahmad ibn Mājid wrote of Ruguda and a few other notable landmarks and ports of the northern Somali coast, including Berbera, the Sa'ad ad-Din islands aka the Zeila Archipelago near Zeila, Siyara, Maydh, Alula, El-Sheikh, Heis and El-Darad.

John Hanning Speke, an English explorer who made an exploratory expedition to the area in an attempt to reach the Nugaal Valley, described the port town:

On the 21st October, 1854, Lieutenant Speke, from the effects of a stiff easterly wind and a heavy sea, made by mistake the harbour of Rakudah. This place has been occupied by the Rer Dud, descendants of Sambur, son of Ishak. It is said to consist of a small fort, and two or three huts of matting, lately re-erected. About two years ago the settlement was laid waste by the rightful owners of the soil, the Musa Abokr, a sub-family of the Habr Tal Jailah.

— Sir Richard Francis Burton, First Footsteps in East Africa, Or, An Exploration of Harar

== Demographics ==
Ruguda is populated by the Sanbuur sub-division of the Habr Je'lo Isaaq.
