= El-Sheikh =

El-Sheikh Buurta Almis, جبل ألمس
- Town
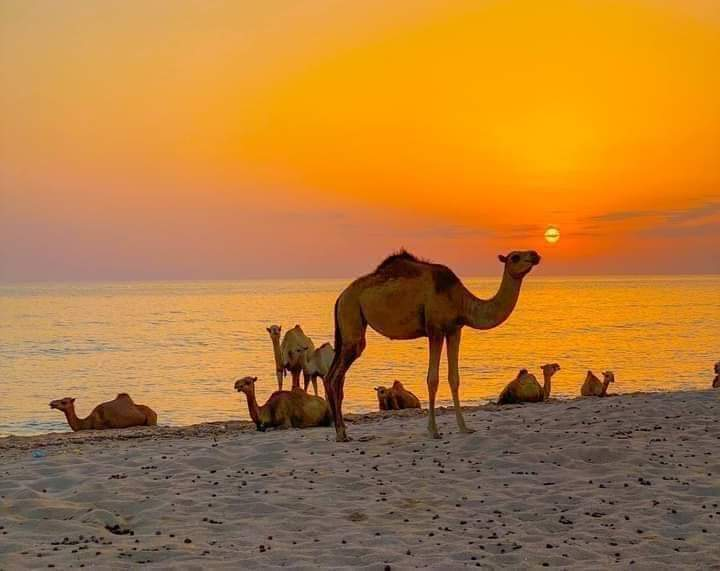
- A beach in El-Sheikh

- Location in Somaliland El-Sheikh (Somaliland)
- Coordinates: 10°26′22″N 44°15′38″E
- Country: Somaliland
- Region: Sahil
- District: Berbera
- Time zone: UTC+3 (EAT)

El-Sheikh (Somali: Ceel-Sheekh) is a coastal settlement in the western edge of the Sahil region of Somaliland.

== History ==
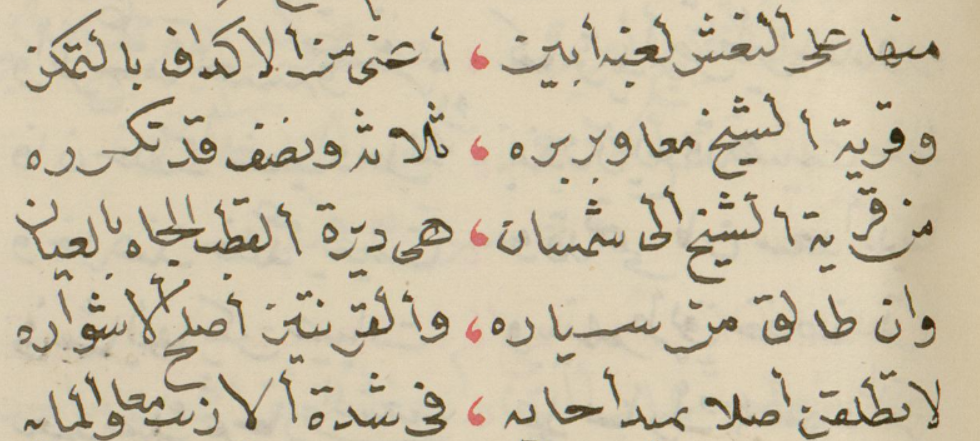
Ibn Majid's notes on El-Sheikh, Berbera, and Siyara

El-Sheikh was also known historically as Buurta Almis or جبل ألمس Jebel Amis after the nearby Mount Almis just south of the settlement. It was a well known landmark to navigators and legendary Arab explorer Ahmad ibn Mājid wrote of El-Sheikh and a few other notable landmarks and ports of the northern Somali coast, including Berbera, Siyara, the Sa'ad ad-Din islands aka the Zeila Archipelago near Zeila, Alula, Maydh, Ruguda, Heis and El-Darad. Richard Burton visited the settlement and noted the mountain in his map.

After the Habr Awal massacre of Richard Burton's travel party and death of a number of British officers in 1854 led the Royal Navy to blockad the Ciise Muuse coast. The blockade was established from Mount Almis to Siyara and crippled trade in Berbera and Bulhar with a settlement being reached in 1856.

El-Sheikh remained a well used by the Habr Awal Ciise Muuse throughout the British Somaliland period and this is noted in the late 1940s and 50s survey of the protectorate.

== Demographics ==
The Sacad Muuse subclan of the Isaaq reside in Ceel-Sheekh and its environs.

== See also ==
- Berbera
- Bulhar
- Siyara
- Zeila
