= Berbera =

Berbera Berbera (Somali) بربرة (Arabic)
- City
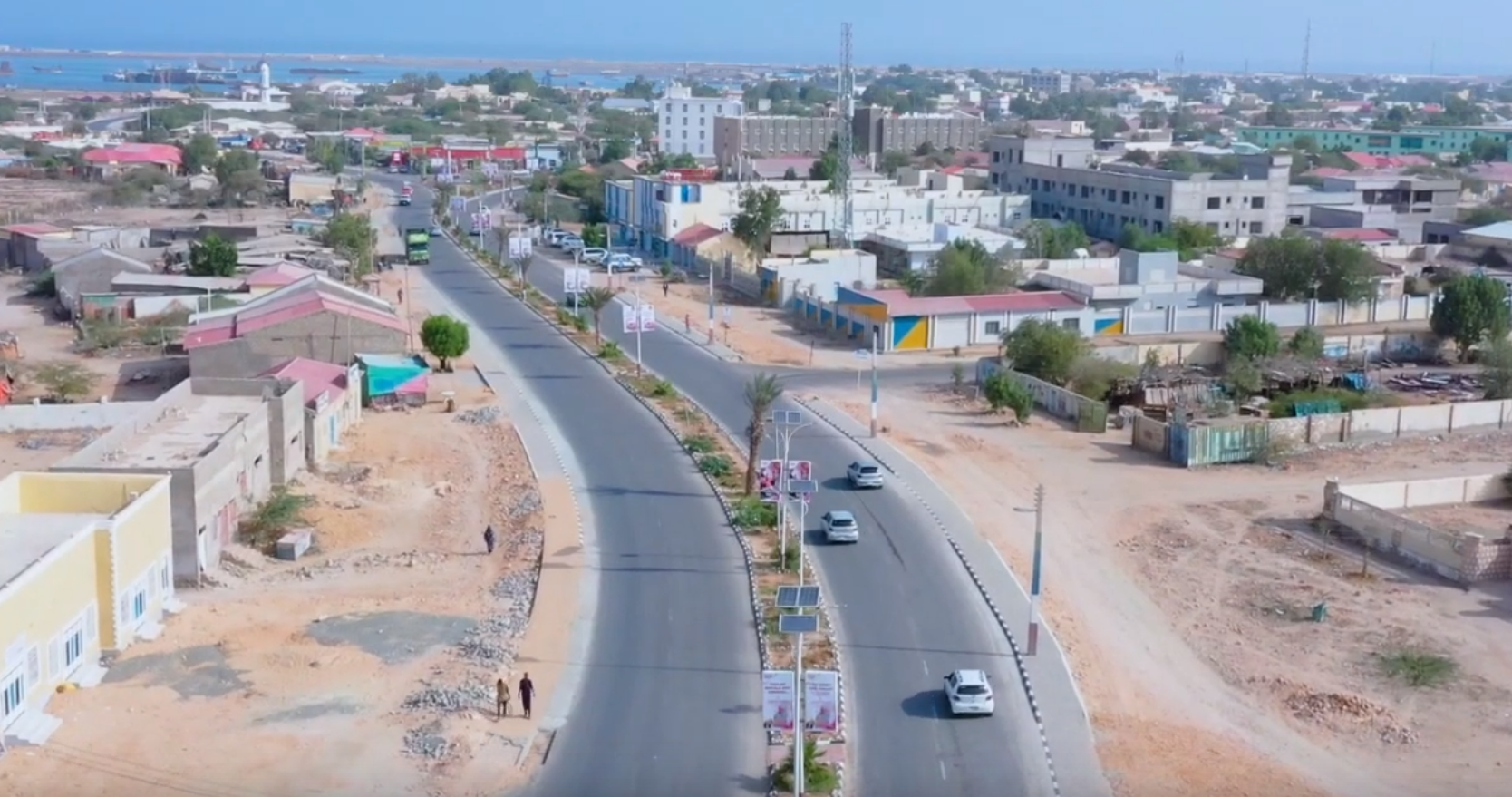
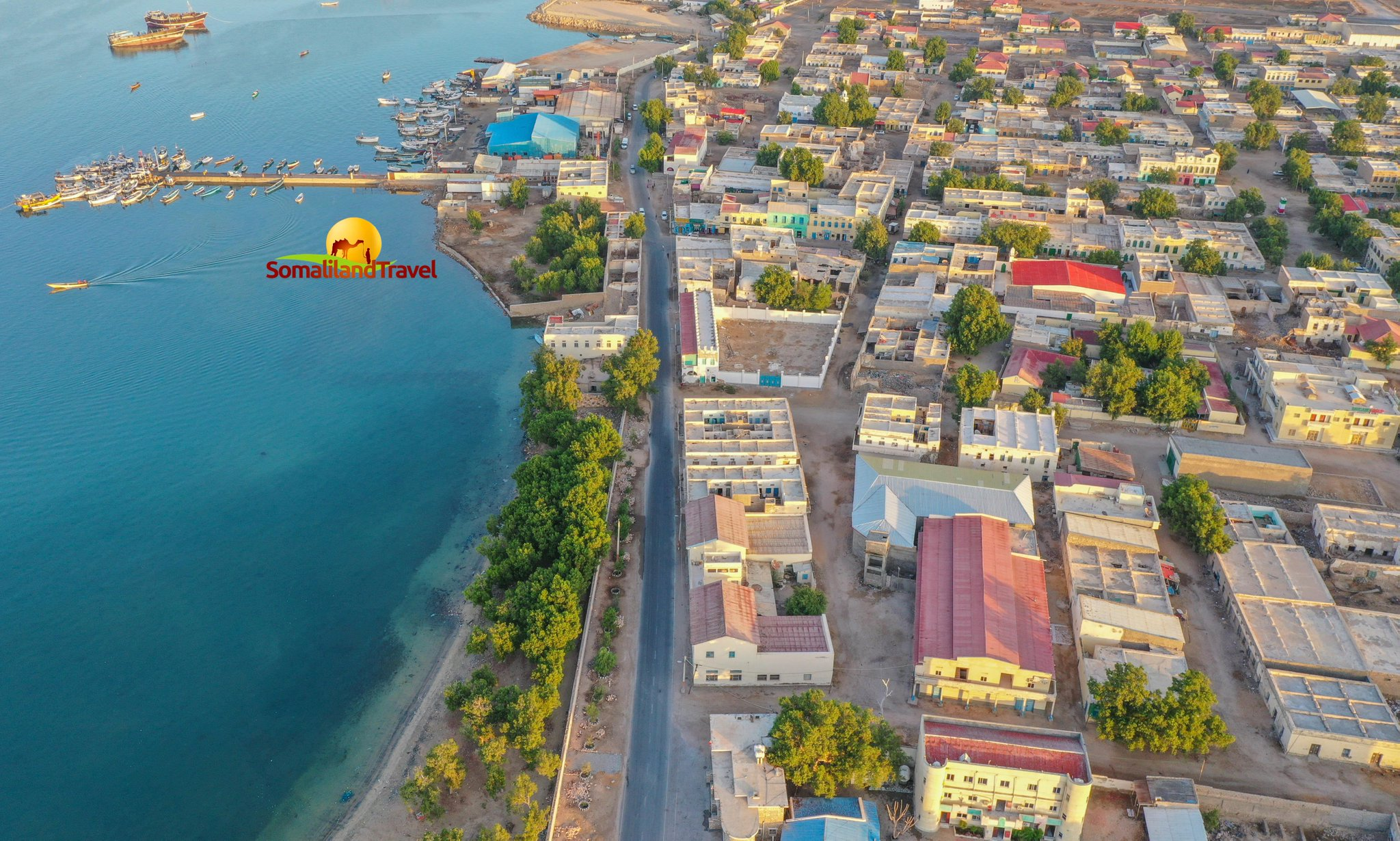
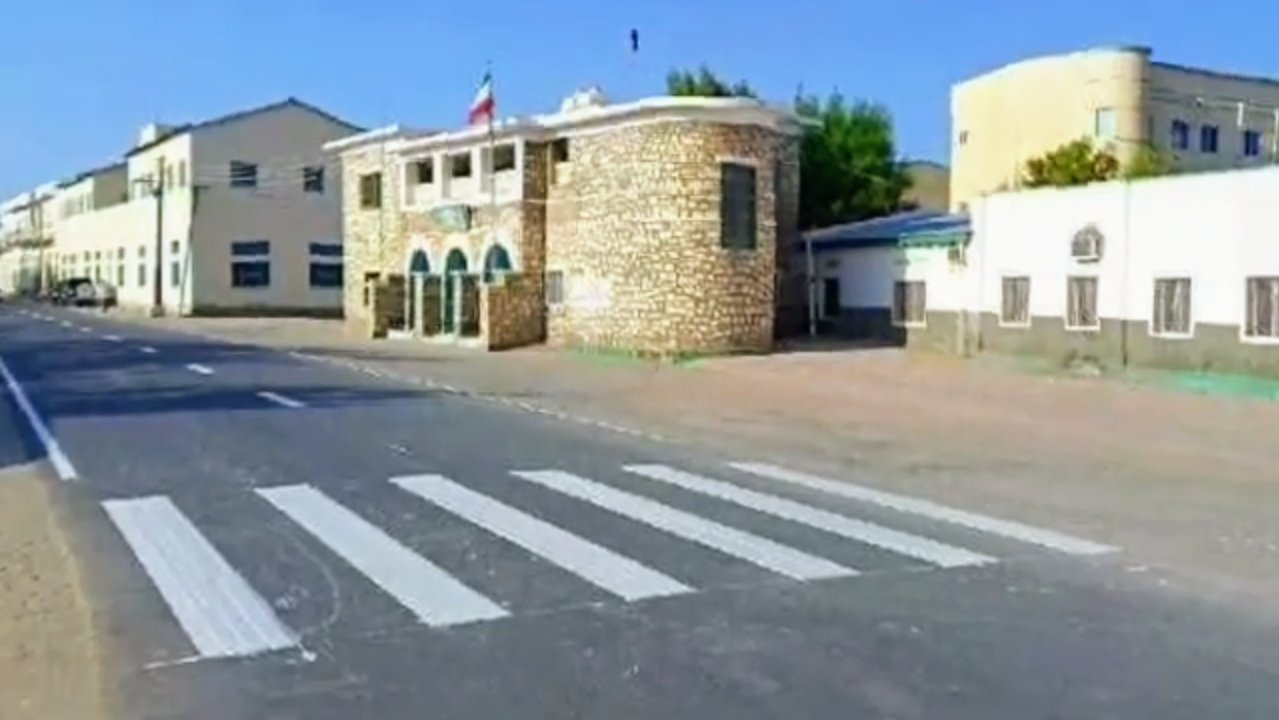
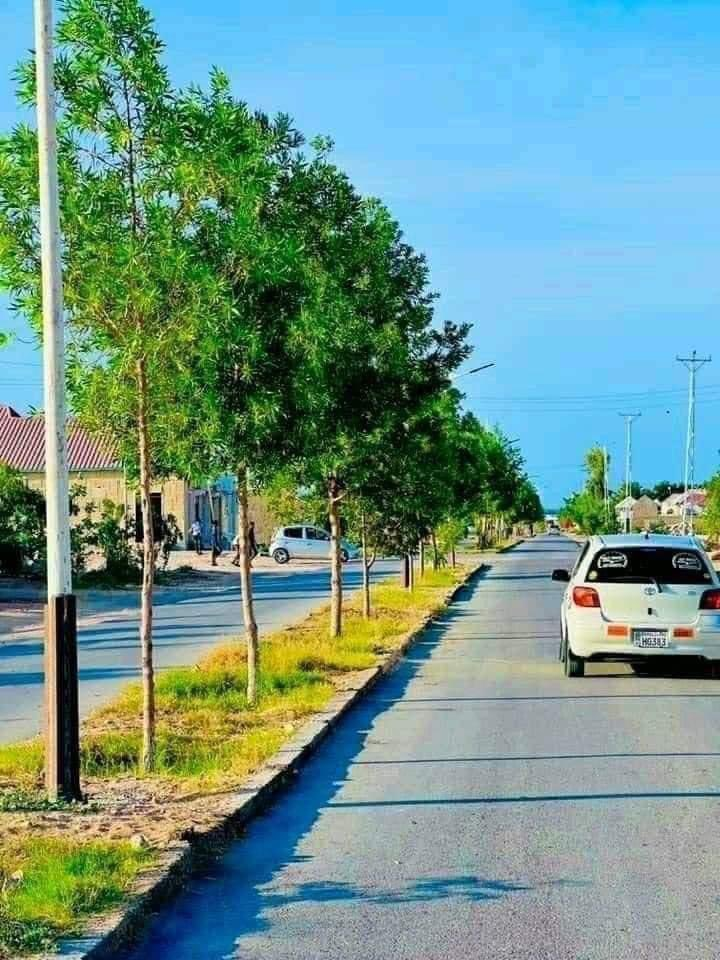
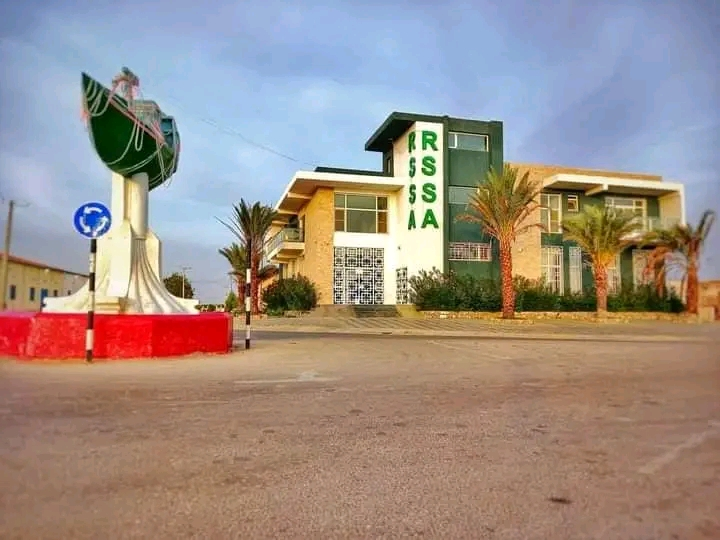

- Flag Seal
- Interactive map of Berbera
- Coordinates: 10°26′08″N 45°00′59″E
- Country: Somaliland
- Region: Sahil
- District: Berbera District

Government
  - Mayor: Abdishakur Iddin
- Elevation: 3 m (9.8 ft)

Population (2019)
  - City: 242,344
  - Rank: 4th
  - Urban: 478,000
- Demonym(s): Barbaraawi بربراوي
- Time zone: UTC+3 (EAT)

Berbera (burr-burr-AH; Somali: Berbera, Arabic: بربرة) is the capital of the Sahil region of Somaliland and is the main sea port of the country, located approximately 160 km from the national capital, Hargeisa. Berbera is a coastal city and was the former capital of the British Somaliland protectorate before Hargeisa. It also served as a major port of the Ifat, Adal and Isaaq sultanates from the 13th to 19th centuries.

In antiquity, Berbera was part of a chain of commercial port cities along the Somali seaboard. During the early modern period, Berbera was the most important place of trade in the Somali Peninsula. It later served as the capital of the British Somaliland protectorate from 1884 to 1941, when it was replaced by Hargeisa. In 1960, the British Somaliland protectorate gained independence as the State of Somaliland and, five days later, united with the Trust Territory of Somalia (the former Italian Somalia) to form the Somali Republic. Located strategically on the oil route, the city has a deep seaport, which serves as the region's main commercial harbour.

== Etymology ==
The name Berbera comes from the Somali phrase beri-beri, meaning "occasionally". Before it became a major port city, Berbera was a seasonal settlement, only inhabited during cooler months. Residents still head for milder weather in the summer, a vacation tradition called xagaa-bax, which is also common in other coastal cities (e.g. Djibouti, Bosaso).

According to the Royal Asiatic Society, the name could be derived from the Arabic word barbarah, meaning "talking much, shouting".

== History ==
=== Antiquity ===
Berbera was part of the classical Somali city-states that engaged in a lucrative trade network connecting Somali merchants with Phoenicia, Ptolemic Egypt, Ancient Greece, Parthian Persia, Saba, Nabataea and the Roman Empire. Somali sailors used the ancient Somali maritime vessel known as the beden to transport their cargo.

Berbera preserves the ancient name of the coast along the southern shore of the Gulf of Aden. It is believed to be the ancient port of Malao (Ancient Greek: Μαλαὼ) described as 800 stadia beyond the city of the Avalites, described in the eighth chapter of the Periplus of the Erythraean Sea, which was written by a Greek merchant in the first century AD. In the Periplus it is described as:

"After Avalites there is another market-town, better than this, called Malao, distant a sail of about eight hundred stadia. The anchorage is an open roadstead, sheltered by a spit running out from the east. Here the natives are more peaceable. There are imported into this place the things already mentioned, and many tunics, cloaks from Arsinoe, dressed and dyed; drinking-cups, sheets of soft copper in small quantity, iron, and gold and silver coin, but not much. There are exported from these places myrrh, a little frankincense, (that known as far-side), the harder cinnamon, duaca, Indian copal and macir, which are imported into Arabia; and slaves, but rarely."

— Chap.8.

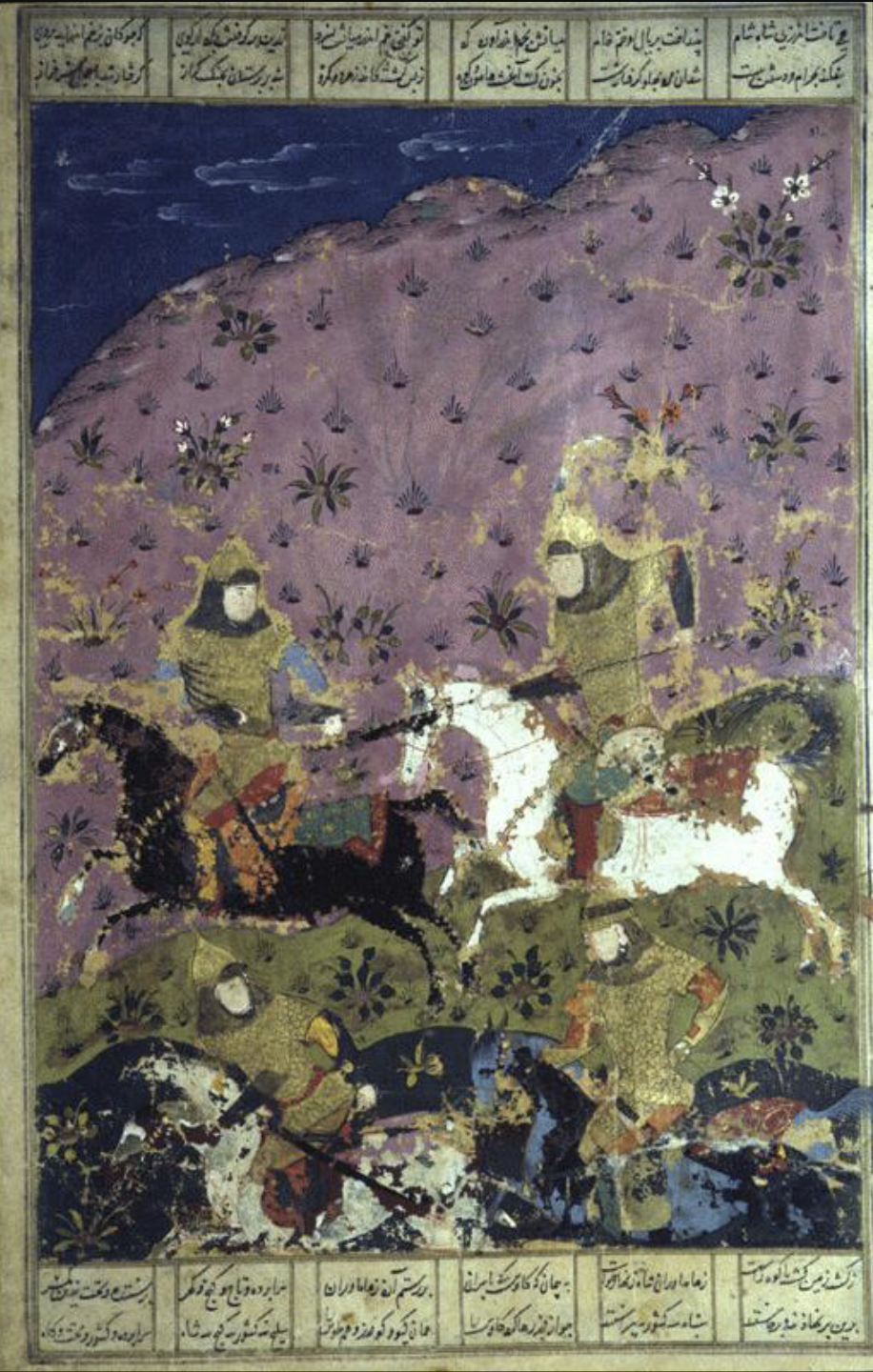
Guraza in battle against the ruler of Berbera

In the 6th-century Sassanid text, the Letter of Tansar, the third part of the world is designated the "Land of the Blacks" which stretches from Barbaria to India. Barbaria in this context alludes to the city of Berbera. The Persian Firdawsi in his epic, the Shahnama, refers to 'Barbaristan', which according to J. Darmester corresponds with modern-day Somalia, now in Somaliland.

In the epic poem, soldiers from Barbaristan march upon the orders of their king, coordinating with Himavarin. Their forces capture renowned Persian warriors such as Giv, Gidarz, and Tus. Ka'us, the epic's protagonist, responds by rallying his forces, leading them towards Barbaristan. The encounter is fierce, with Barbaristan's forces ultimately becoming overwhelmed. The elders of Barbaristan, recognizing their defeat, seek peace and offer tribute to Ka'us, who accepts and imposes new laws.

Later, the combined forces of Barbaristan and Himavarin, consisting of over two hundred elephants and a two-mile-long battle line, clash with the Persians. Rustam captures and subdues key figures, including the king of Himavarin, significantly weakening the coalition. Guraza, a key Sassanid figure, captures the monarch of Barbaristan and forty chiefs.

=== Middle Ages ===
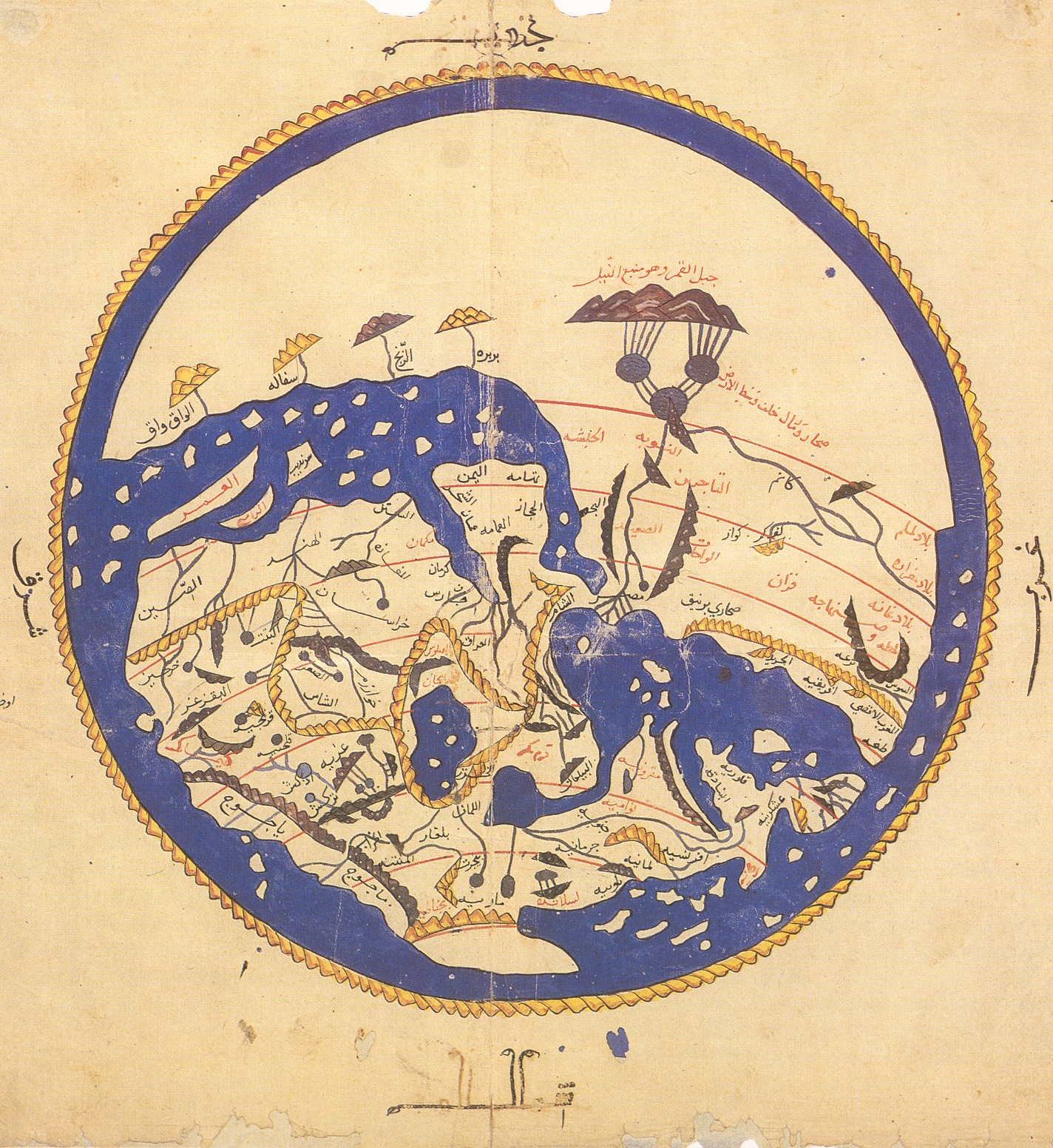
Al-Idrisi's world map from 'Alî ibn Hasan al-Hûfî al-Qâsimî's 1456 copy. Berbera 'بربرة' can be clearly seen in this later edition of the Tabula Rogeriana

Duan Chengshi, a Chinese Tang dynasty scholar, described in his written work of AD 863 the slave trade, ivory trade, and ambergris trade of Bobali, which is thought to be Berbera. The great city was also later mentioned by the Islamic traveller Ibn Sa'id as well as Ibn Battuta in the thirteenth century.

In Abu'l-Fida's A Sketch of the Countries (Arabic: تقويم البلدان), the present-day Gulf of Aden was called the Gulf of Berbera, which shows how important Berbera was in both regional and international trade during the medieval period.

The Book of Curiosities uniquely depicts the Indian Ocean as an enclosed narrow sea, per Ptolemaic tradition, drawn in two halves; eastern (India and China) and western (East Africa) later joined elliptically. In the surviving copy, the halves are misplaced, linking China to Arabia and Africa to India. The Somali section, rich in original detail, names Berbera’s coast, and several mountains are marked, including the Cape of Guardafui at the tip of the Horn of Africa. Maydh, Heis, and other capes are also visualized.

Legendary Arab explorer Ahmad ibn Mājid wrote of Berbera and a few other notable landmarks and ports of the northern Somali coast and referred to what is now the Gulf of Aden as the Gulf of Berbera. He also included Zeila and its archipelago, Siyara, Heis, Alula, Ruguda, Maydh, El-Sheikh and El-Darad.

Berbera was an important and well-built settlement that served as a major harbor port for several successive Somali kingdoms in the Middle Ages, such as the early Adal Kingdom, Ifat Sultanate and Adal Sultanate.

Berbera, along with Zeila, were the two most important ports situated inside the Adal Sultanate, and they provided vital political and commercial links with the wider Islamic World:

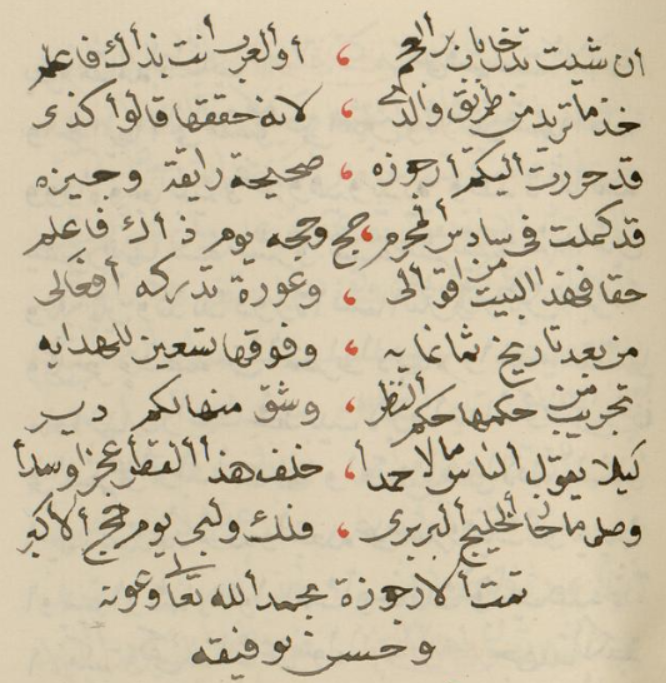
Ibn Majid referring to the Gulf of Aden as the Gulf of Berbera

To Adea belongs a very good Port, call’d Barraboa, whoſe chief City is Arat, obeys a King, who is an enemy to the Abiſſines. Barraboa and Zeila are places of great Trade, by reaſon of the conveniency of their Ports, towards the entry into the Red-Sea.

Translation:

To Adel belongs a very good port, called Barbara, whose chief city is Harar, obeys a King, who is an enemy to the Abyssinians. Barbara and Zeila are places of great trade, by reason of the conveniency of their ports, towards the entry into the Red Sea.

Along with other ports and settlements in East Africa, explorers Ludovico di Varthema, Duarte Barbosa and Leo Africanus wrote brief accounts of the port town of Berbera in the early sixteenth century, mainly detailing her historic trading links with Aden and Khambat (Cambay).

Duarte Barbosa's brief account of Berbera:

Further on, on the same coast, is a town of the Moors [Muslims] called Barbara; it has a port, at which many ships of Adeni and Cambay touch with their merchandise, and from there those of Cambay carry away much gold, and ivory, and other things, and those of Aden take many provisions, meat, honey, and wax, because, as they say, it is a very abundant country.

Not long after their departure from Zeila and Berbera, the Portuguese fleet under Lopo Soares de Albergaria and António de Saldanha sacked both port towns between 1516 and 1518.

According to Selman Reis, an ambitious Ottoman Red Sea admiral, Berbera was rich with pearls, and the amount of merchandise and trade consisting of "gold, musk and ivory" present at Berbera, on the Somali coast, was described by Selman as "limitless".

=== Precolonialism ===
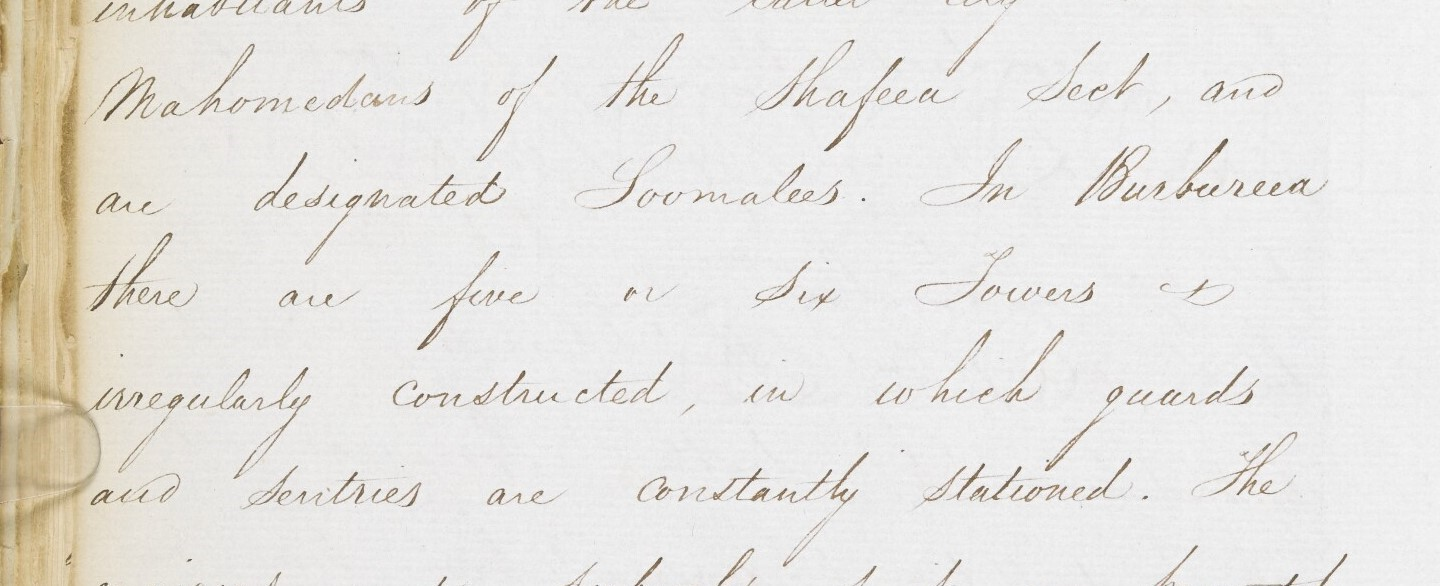
Selection from a letter to the Governor of Bombay detailing Berbera's 5-6 towers and armed guards

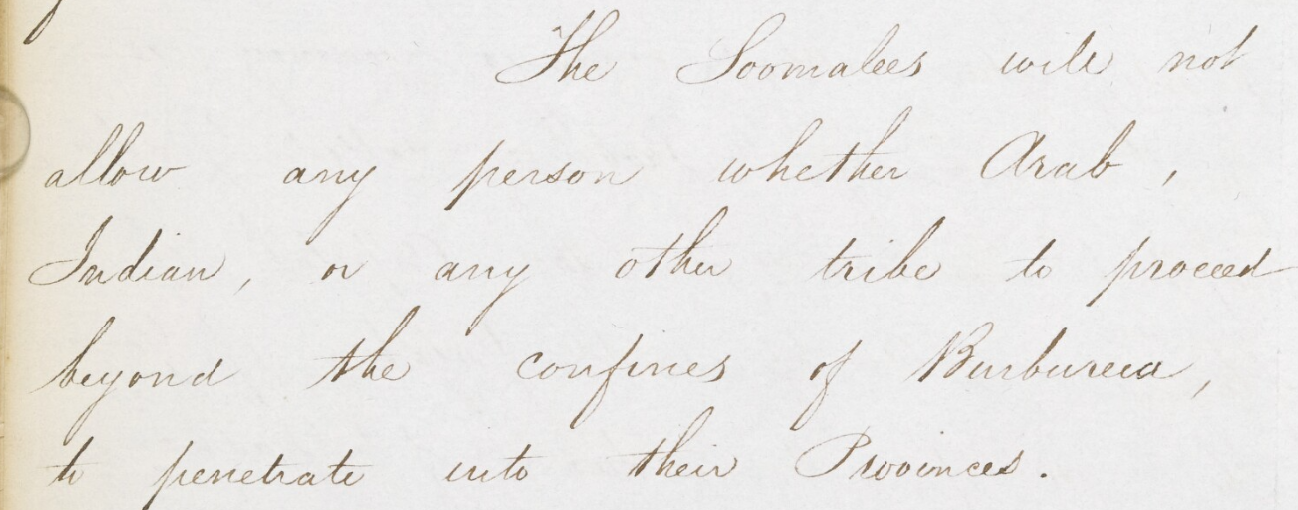
Somalis kept the interior free of foreigners and restricted their access to only Berbera itself

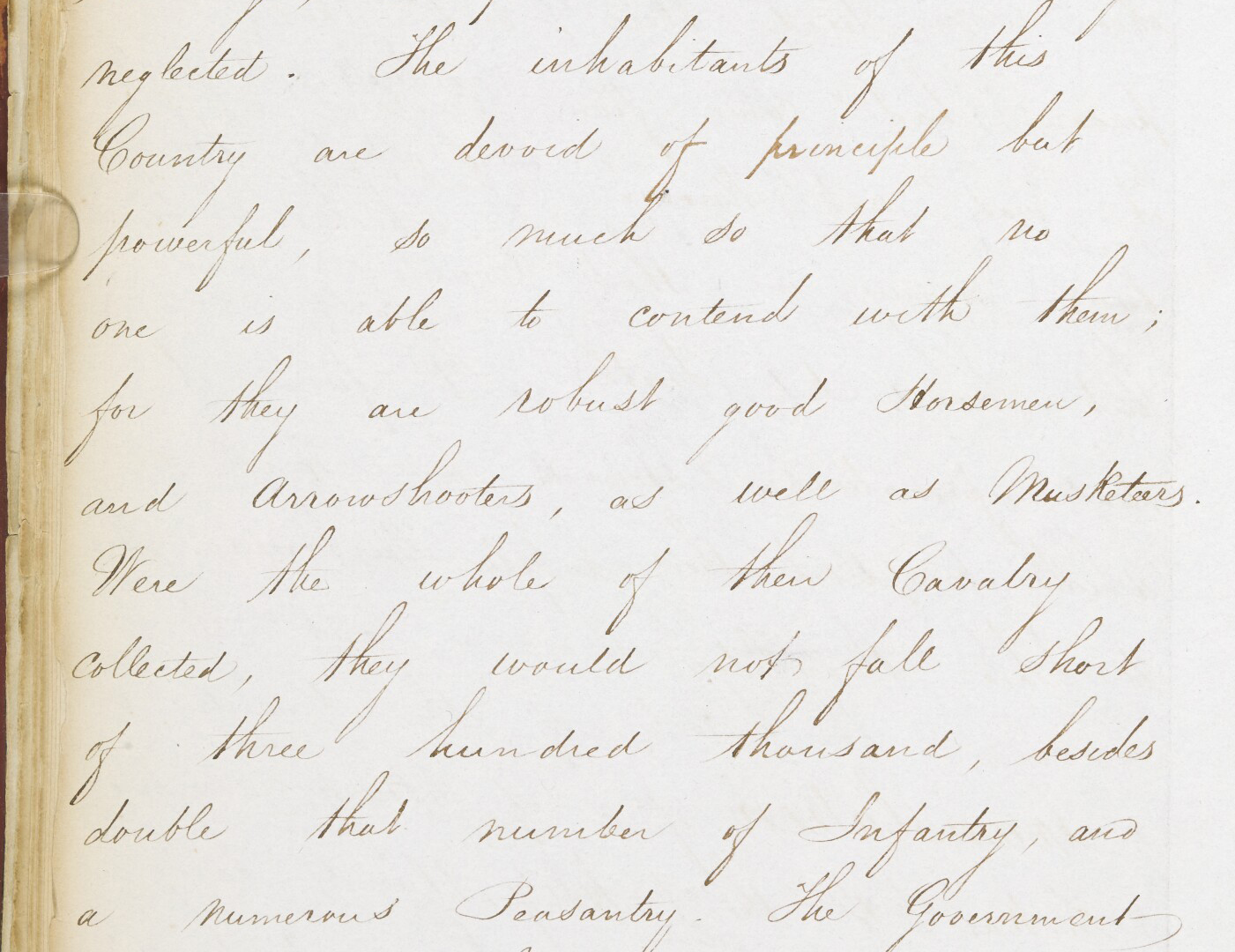
Berbera's inhabitants proficiency with muskets, possession of a large cavalry and archery skills noted

One of the earliest precolonial accounts comes from Ibrahim Punkar, who wrote a memoir in 1801 and letter in 1809 to the Governor of Bombay John Duncan. Noting that Berbera had 5-6 towers with armed guards, he would go to describe the trade and general outlook of the city. Further noting the Somali inhabitants adhering to the Shafi'i school of Sunni Islam significant trade came from Harar in the interior alongside Gondar and Shewa. Cloth, rice and tobacco came from Kutch in Gujarat and Muscat with Mokha, Jeddah and Al Mukalla being the source of dates and tin. Punkar stated that the Somalis of the area were skilled musketeers and possessed powerful cavalry and knowledge of archery, but were often internally divided except for when united against common enemies. All foreigners including Arabs and Indians who often frequented Berbera were prohibited from venturing further inland, lest they access the lucrative trade of Harar directly and bypass the Somalis.

One certainty about Berbera over the following centuries was that it was the site of an annual fair, held between October and April, which Mordechai Abir describes as "among the most important commercial events of the east coast of Africa." The major Somali sub-clans of the Isaaq in Somaliland, caravans from Harar and the interior, and Banyan merchants from Porbandar, Mangalore and Mumbai gathered to trade. All of this was kept secret from European merchants. Lieutenant C. J. Cruttenden, who wrote a memoir describing this portion of the Somali coast dated 12 May 1848, provided an account of the Berbera fair and an account of the historic environs of the town: "an aqueduct of stone and chunam, some nine miles [15 km] in length", which had once emptied into a presently dry reservoir adjacent to the ruins of a mosque. He explored part of its course from the reservoir past a number of tombs built of stones taken from the aqueduct to reach a spring, above which lay "the remains of a small fort or tower of chunam and stone ... on the hill-side immediately over the spring." Cruttenden noted that in "style it was different to any houses now found on the Somali coast", and concluded with noting the presence in "the neighbourhood of the fort above mentioned [an] abundance of broken glass and pottery ... from which I infer that it was a place of considerable antiquity; but, though diligent search was made, no traces of inscriptions could be discovered."

Berbera was the most important port in the Somali Peninsula in the 18th and 19th centuries. For centuries, Berbera had extensive trade relations with several historic ports in Arabia and the Indian subcontinent. Additionally, the Somali and Ethiopian interiors were very dependent on Berbera for trade, where most of the goods for export arrived from. During the 1833 trading season, the port town swelled up to 70,000 people, and upwards of 6,000 camels laden with goods arrived from the interior within a single day. Berbera was the main marketplace in the entire Somali seaboard for various goods procured from the interior, such as livestock, coffee, frankincense, myrrh, acacia gum, saffron, feathers, wax, ghee, hide (skin), gold and ivory. In the trading season of 1840, French explorer Charles-Xavier Rochet d'Héricourt visited Berbera and estimated the total exports of the season to be around thirteen times greater than that of Massawa.

According to a trade journal published in 1856, Berbera was described as "the freest port in the world, and the most important trading place on the whole Arabian Gulf.":

"The only seaports of importance on this coast are Feyla [Zeila] and Berbera; the former is an Arabian colony, dependent of Mocha, but Berbera is independent of any foreign power. It is, without having the name, the freest port in the world, and the most important trading place on the whole Arabian Gulf. From the beginning of November to the end of April, a large fair assembles in Berbera, and caravans of 6,000 camels at a time come from the interior loaded with coffee, (considered superior to Mocha in Bombay), gum, ivory, hides, skins, grain, cattle, and sour milk, the substitute of fermented drinks in these regions; also much cattle is brought there for the Aden market."

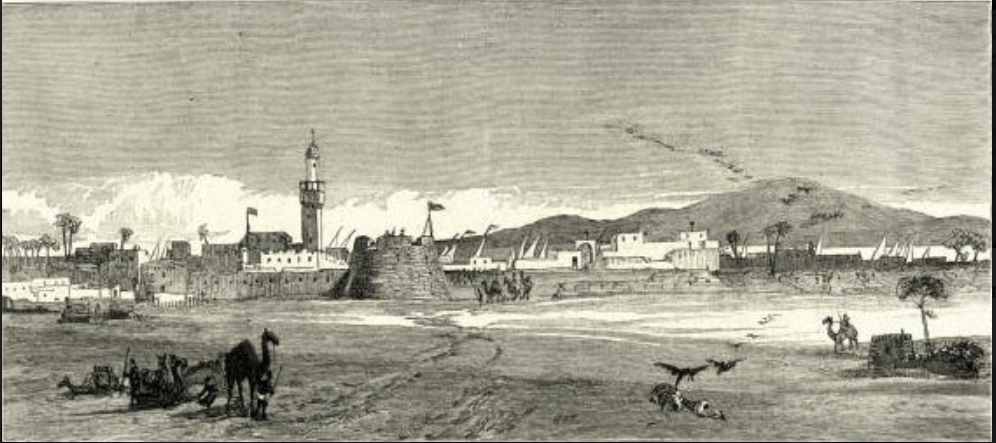
Illustration of Berbera, 1884

Historically, the port of Berbera was controlled indigenously between the mercantile Reer Ahmed Nur (Ayyal Ahmed) and Reer Yunis Nuh (Ayyal Yunis) sub-clans of the Sa'ad Musa, Habr Awal. These two sub-clans effectively administered the trade of the town, especially in the dealings of all transactions and brokerage between various parties to issuing protection agreements towards the foreign Arab and Indian traders. In the year 1845, the two sub-clans had a dissension over the control of the trade of Berbera, which lead to a wider altercation where each side sought outside support. With the backing of Haji Sharmarke Ali Saleh, the Reer Ahmed Nuh drove out their kinsmen and declared themselves the sole commercial masters of Berbera. The defeated Reer Yunis Nuh moved westwards and established the port of Bulhar which later, for a brief period, became a trading rival to nearby Berbera. Sharmarke Ali Saleh's actions were a political ruse to control Berbera for himself, which he achieved for several years.

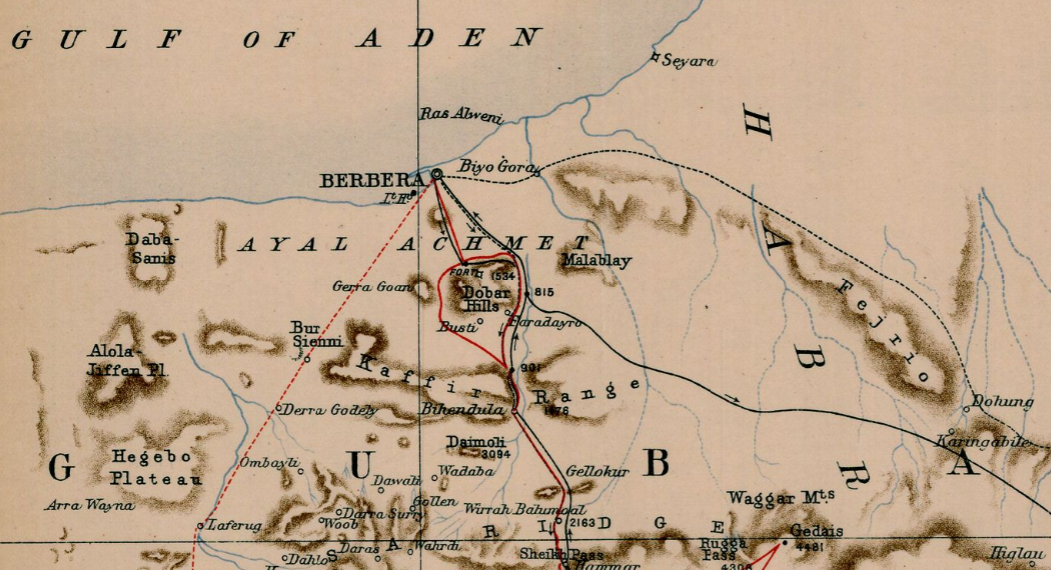
Map showing Berbera and her trade routes, with the 'Ayal Achmet' (Reer Ahmed Nuh) located in Berbera and its environs

Berbera commanded most of the trade traffic with the Somali and Ethiopian interiors. The two main caravan trade routes from Berbera extended to Harar and Shewa in the west, and to the Shebelle basin in the south (although some caravans traveled to/from as far as the Jubba River). Moreover, the inland caravan trade routes were also concurrently used as pilgrim routes during the trading season by Somali Hajj pilgrims who resided in the deep interior.

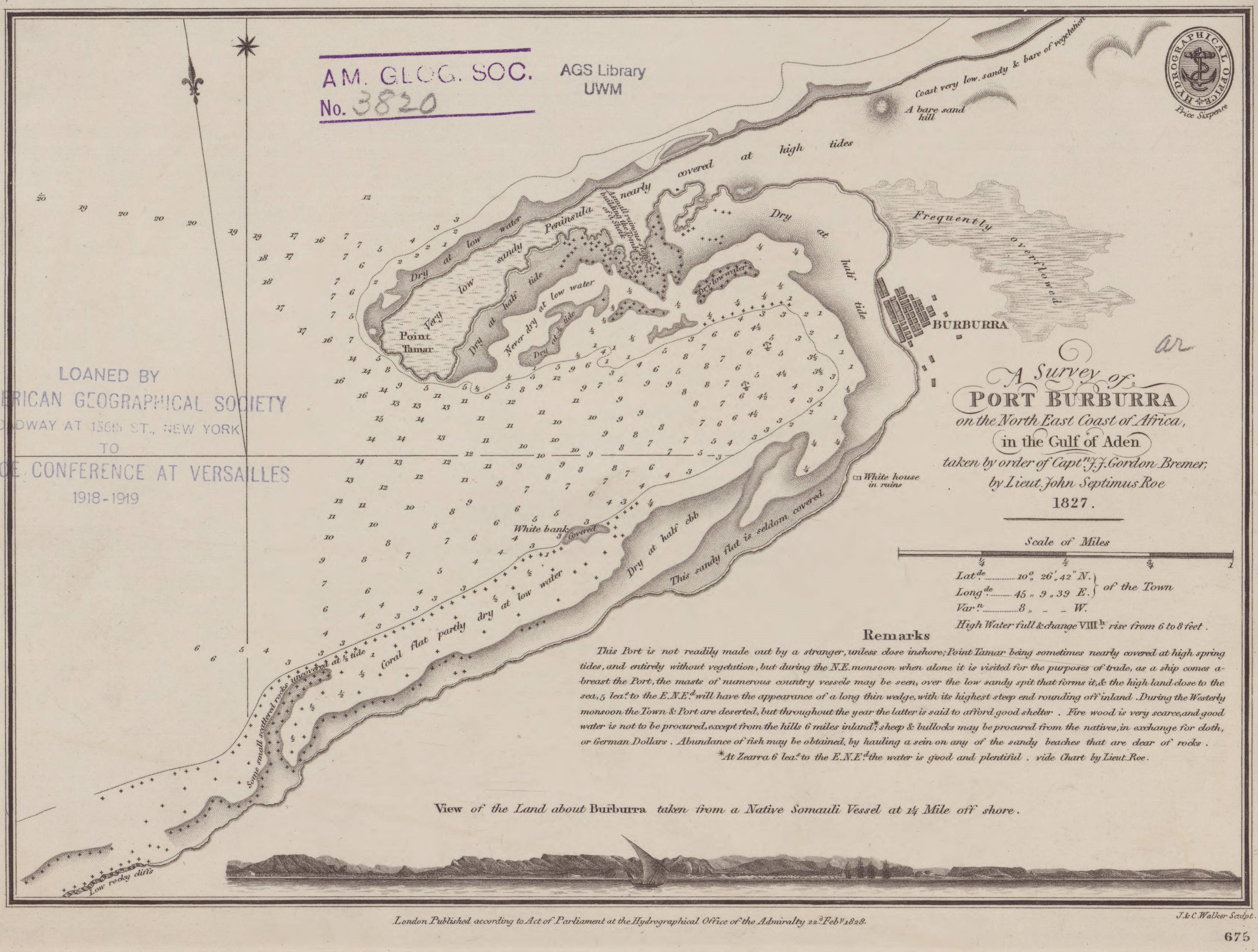
An Admiralty Chart of Berbera drawn by Lieutenant John Septimus Roe

In addition, Mokha, Aden, Jeddah and several other ports in Arabia had constant contact with Berbera in regard to general trade and commerce. In the early years of the nineteenth century, the local Somalis of Berbera (Habr Awal clan) had a navigation act where they excluded Arab vessels and brought the goods and produce of the interior in their own ships to the Arabian ports:

Berbera held an annual fair during the cool rain-free months between October and April. This long drawn out market handled immense quantities of coffee, gum Arabic, myrrh and other commodities. These goods in the early nineteenth century were almost exclusively handled by Somalis who, Salt says, had "a kind of navigation act by which they exclude the Arab vessels from their ports and bring the produce of their country either to Aden or Mocha in their own dows."

In much of the 19th century, the trade between Berbera and Aden was so important to the later that when disturbances effected the Berbera trading season, Aden too suffered as a result. According to Captain Haines, who was then the colonial administrator of Aden (1839-1854), 80% of Aden's revenue in 1848 was derived from duties charged on imported goods from Berbera. Additionally, most of the coffee imported by Mokha (centre of the coffee trade in early modern times) arrived via Somali merchants from Berbera, who procured the coffee beans from the environs of Harar. Although the coffee beans were grown in Harar (present-day Ethiopia), the coffee was named Berbera Coffee in the international market, and the beans were considered superior to the locally grown varieties in Yemen.

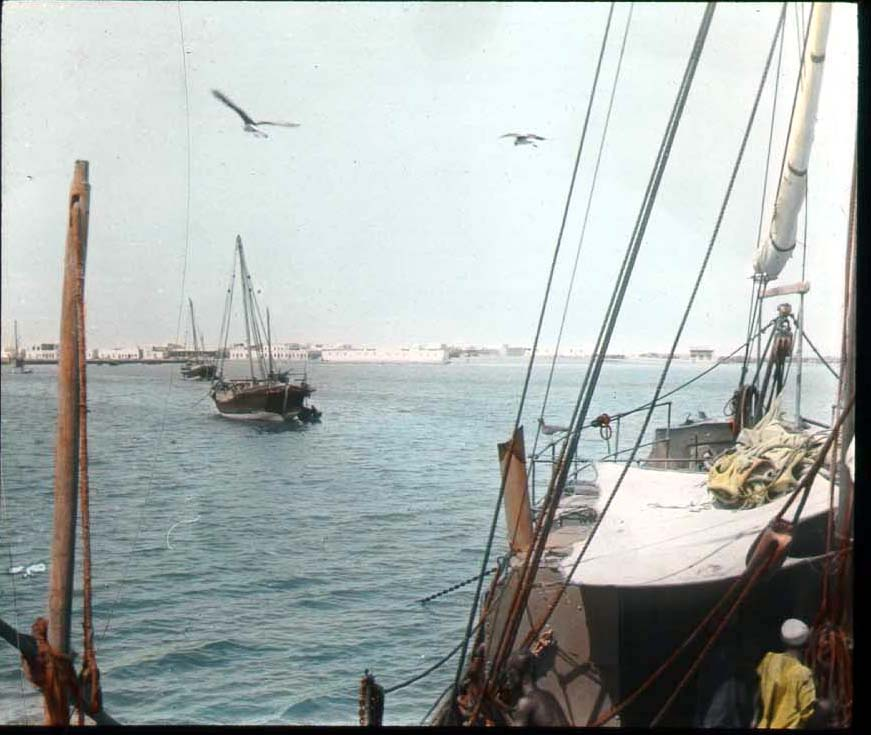
Berbera harbour, 1896

The British explorer Richard Burton made two visits to this port, and his second visit was marred by an attack on his camp by a group of local Somali warriors, and although Burton was able to escape to Aden, one of his companions was killed. Burton, recognizing the importance of the port city wrote:

In the first place, Berberah is the true key of the Red Sea, the centre of East African traffic, and the only safe place for shipping upon the western Erythraean shore, from Suez to Guardafui. Backed by lands capable of cultivation, and by hills covered with pine and other valuable trees, enjoying a comparatively temperate climate, with a regular although thin monsoon, this harbour has been coveted by many a foreign conqueror. Circumstances have thrown it as it were into our arms, and, if we refuse the chance, another and a rival nation will not be so blind.

By 1869, a sub-clan of the Reer Ahmed Nur (Ayyal Ahmed, Habr Awal) were operating a fort in the port town and it was manned by several hired guards armed with muskets and fiercely loyal to them. A British officer visiting the city from Aden noted the guards would not betray the Reer Ahmed Nur save death.

==== Battle ====
When a British vessel named the Mary Anne attempted to dock in Berbera's port in 1825 it was attacked and multiple members of the crew were massacred by the Habr Awal. In response the Royal Navy enforced a blockade and some accounts narrate a bombardment of the city. In 1827 two years later the British arrived and extended an offer to relieve the blockade which had halted Berbera's lucrative trade in exchange for indemnity. Following this offer the Battle of Berbera 1827 broke out. After the Habr Awal defeat, 15,000 Spanish dollars was to be paid by the Habr Awal leaders for the destruction of the ship and loss of life.

In the 1830s, the Isaaq Sultan Farah Guled and Haji Ali penned a letter to Sultan bin Saqr Al Qasimi of Ras Al Khaimah requesting military assistance and joint religious war against the British. This did not materialize, for Sultan Saqr was incapacitated by the prior Persian Gulf campaign of 1819 and was unable to send aid to Berbera. Alongside their stronghold in the Persian Gulf & Gulf of Oman the Qasimi were very active both militarily and economically in the Gulf of Aden and were given to plunder and attack ships as far west as the Mokha on the Red Sea. They had numerous commercial ties with the Somalis, leading vessels from Ras Al Khaimah and the Persian Gulf to regularly attend trade fairs in the large ports of Berbera and Zeila and were very familiar with the Isaaq.

=== British Somaliland ===
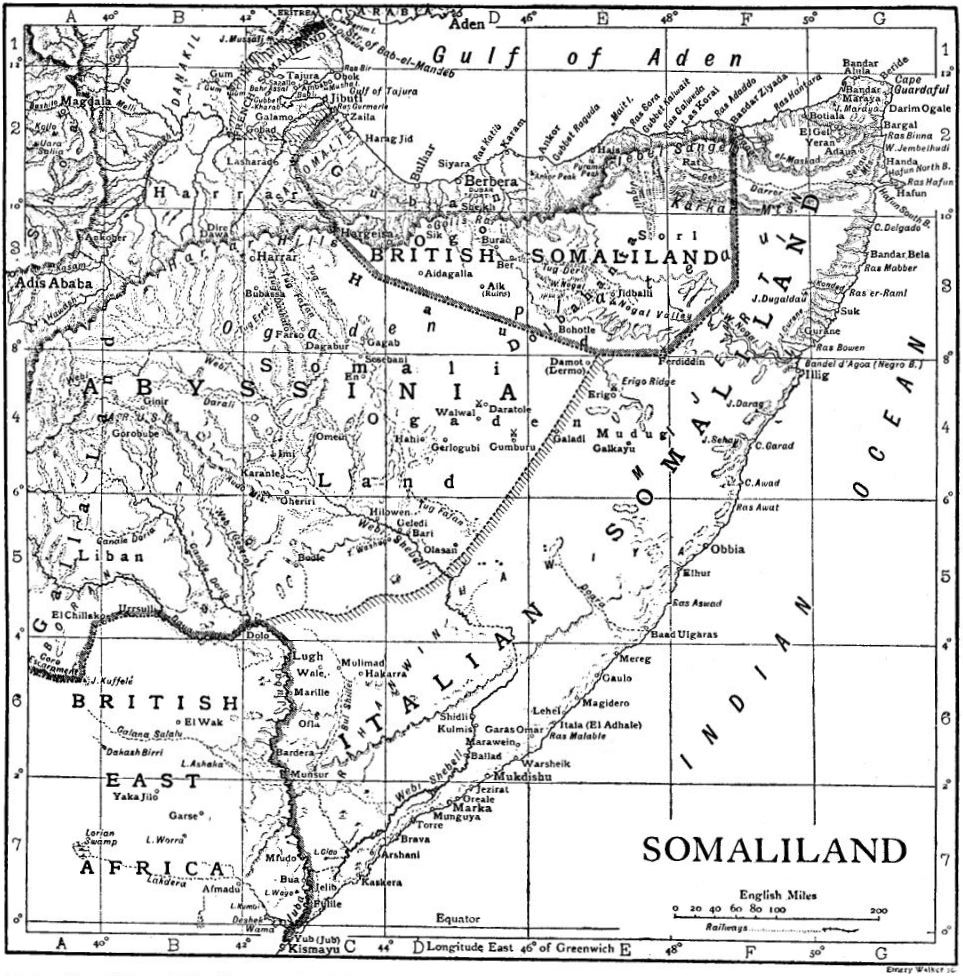
1911 map showing Italian Somaliland and British Somaliland, including Berbera

After signing successive treaties with the various clans of the northern Somali coast between 1884 and 1886, the British established a protectorate in the region referred to as British Somaliland. The British garrisoned the protectorate from Aden and administered it from their British India colony until 1898. British Somaliland was then administered by the Foreign Office until 1905 and afterwards by the Colonial Office.

Despite Berbera's strategic location, being the only port with a sheltered harbor on the southern side of the Gulf of Aden (the gateway to the Suez Canal), the British later came to regret their nominal control of the region. In fact, Winston Churchill once visited Berbera in 1907 when he was Under-Secretary of State for the Colonies, and he noted the protectorate be abandoned, since it was "unproductive, inhospitable, and the people are very hostile to occupation." The stated purposes of the establishment of the protectorate were to "secure a supply market and to exclude the interference of foreign powers." The British principally viewed the protectorate as a source for supplies of meat for their British Indian outpost in Aden through the maintenance of order in the coastal areas and protection of the caravan routes from the interior. Colonial administration during this period did not extend infrastructure beyond the coast (which left the Somali clans within the protectorate with greater autonomy), and contrasted with the more interventionist colonial experience of Italian Somalia. In the early days of the protectorate, some planned to invest in major infrastructure projects such as the abandoned Berbera-Harar Railway initiative; this was vetoed by parliament because it would harm the cordial agreement (entente cordiale) between France and Britain.

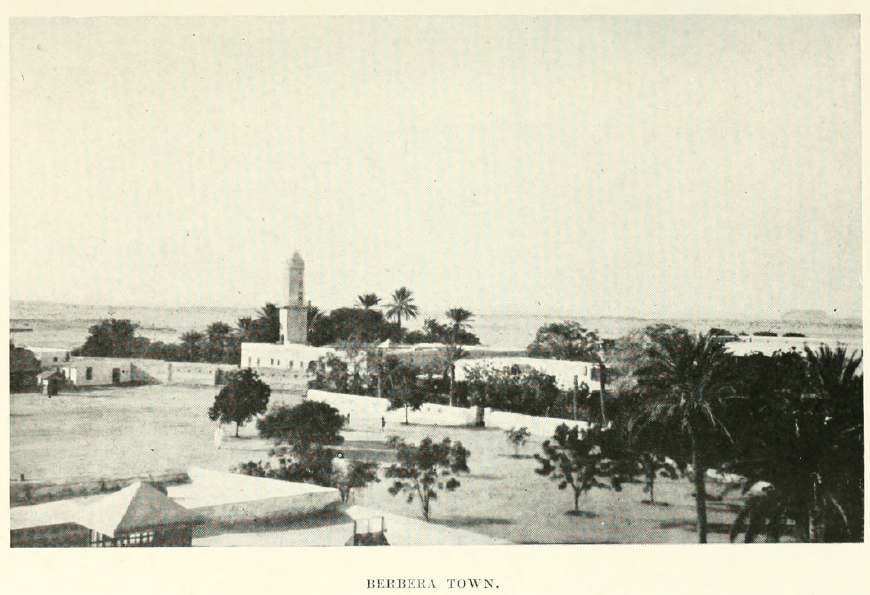
Part of Berbera town in 1912

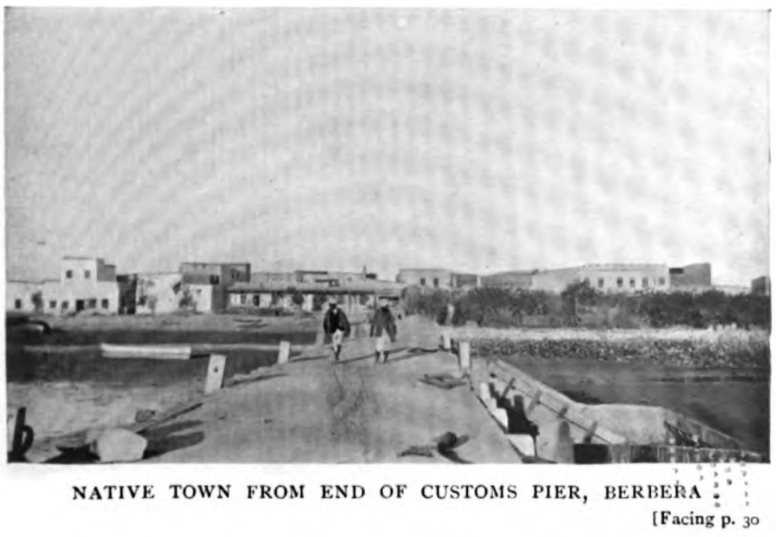
Bebrera native town as seen from the customs pier

In August 1940, during the East African Campaign, British Somaliland was briefly occupied by Italy after a large invasion force defeated British colonial troops at the Battle of Tug Argan. During this period, the British rounded up soldiers and governmental officials to evacuate them from the territory through Berbera. In total, 7,000 people, including civilians, were evacuated. The Somalis serving in the Somaliland Camel Corps were given the choice of evacuation or disbandment; the majority chose to remain and were allowed to retain their arms. In March 1941, the British forces recaptured the protectorate during Operation Appearance after a six-month occupation. The first WW2 Australian POWs were taken hostage here in 1940.

The British Somaliland protectorate gained its independence on 26 June 1960 as the State of Somaliland, before uniting as planned five days later with the Trust Territory of Somalia (the former Italian Somalia) to form the Somali Republic.

=== Modernity ===
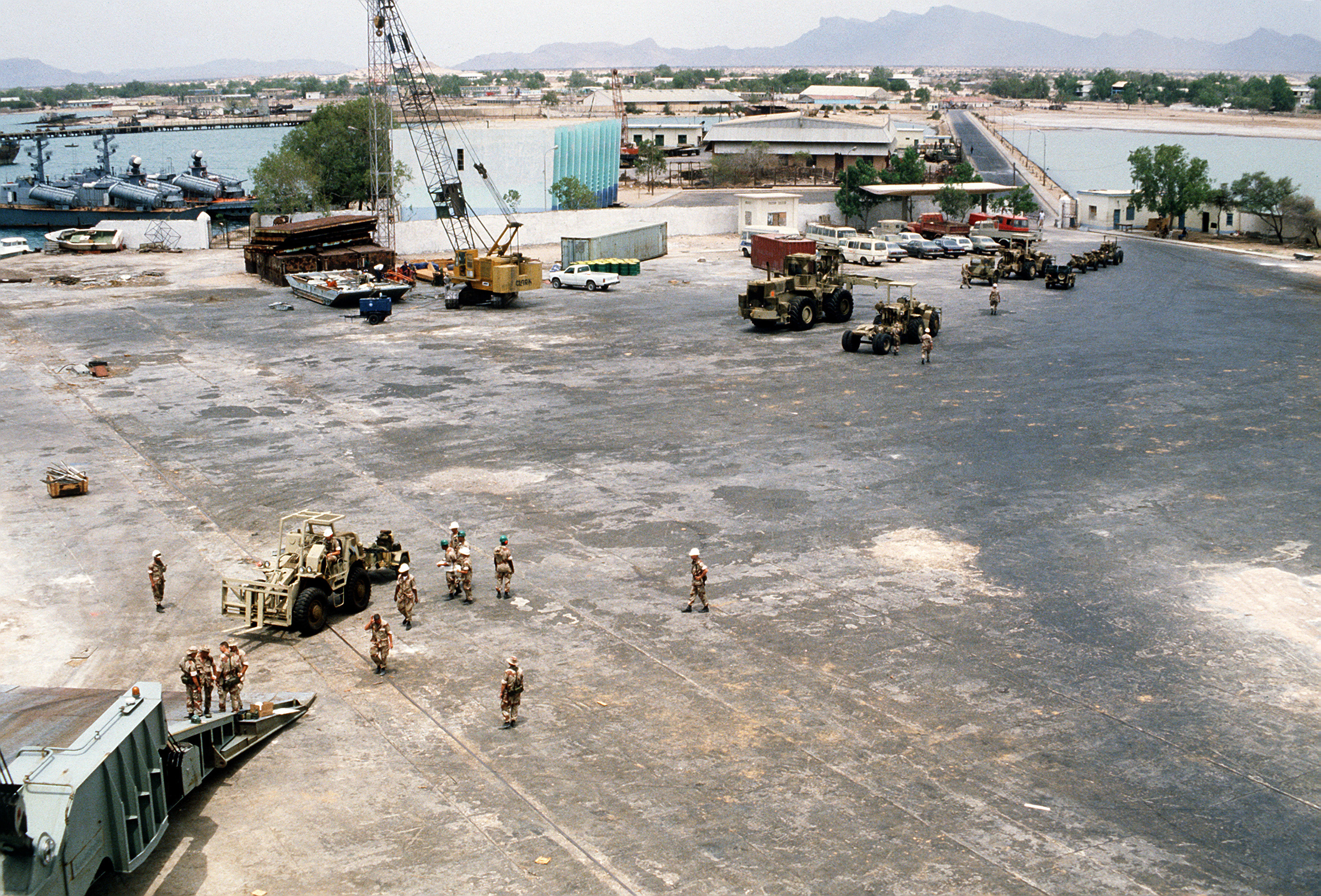
U.S. Marines in Berbera during the Exercise Eastern Wind joint naval drill in 1983

In the post-independence period, Berbera was administered as part of the North-Western province of the Somali Republic. It served as the main livestock port of the republic; in the 1970s and 1980s, nearly all of the livestock exports went out through the port of Berbera via Isaaq livestock traders. The entire livestock exports accounted to upwards of 90% of the Somali Republic's entire export figures in a given year, and Berbera's exports alone provided over 75% of the nation's recorded foreign currency income at the time. The main consumers were the wealthy Gulf states; in particular, Saudi Arabia.

As early as 1962, the Soviet Union agreed to assist the nascent Somali Republic towards the construction of modern port facilities and a military base, which was completed in 1969 and was called on by sixteen Soviet ships in 1971. Around the time of the Ogaden War between the Somali Republic and Ethiopia in 1977, the Soviets – owing to a disagreement – left Berbera (and the Somali Republic as a whole), enabling the United States to arrive with a $40 million investment and new health facilities in 1980. By 1985, the city had an estimated population of 70,000, with the outbreak of the Somali National Movement (SNM) ousted government troops from the city following aerial bombardments and extrajudicial killings inflicted on the population by the government. With the downfall of Siad Barre in 1991, the former state of Somaliland declared independence as the Republic of Somaliland. A slow process of infrastructural reconstruction subsequently began in Berbera and other towns in the region.

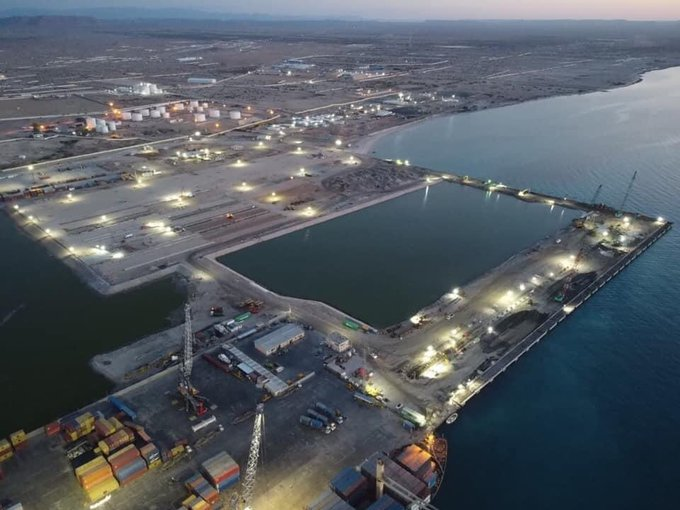
New DP World Berbera Container Terminal Expansion as of June 2020.

The city remains a competitive regional port and in 2016 a US$442 million agreement was reached between DP World and the government of Somaliland. The deal involves enhancing and operating the regional trade and logistics hub at the Port of Berbera. The project, which will be phased in, will also involve the setting up of a free zone.

On 1 March 2018, Ethiopia became a major shareholder following an agreement with DP World and the Somaliland Port Authority. DP World holds a 51% stake in the project, Somaliland 30% and Ethiopia the remaining 19%. As part of the agreement, the government of Ethiopia will invest in infrastructure to develop the Berbera Corridor as a trade gateway for the inland country, which is one of the fastest growing countries in the world. There are also plans to construct an additional berth at the Port of Berbera, in line with the Berbera master plan, which DP World has started implementing, while adding new equipment to further improve efficiencies and productivity of the port.

On 24 June 2021, The CEO of DP World officially announced the second phase of the Berbera port upgrade during the inauguration ceremony for the completion of the first phase. The second phase includes extending the new quay from 400 to 1,000 metres, and adding seven more ship-to-shore gantry cranes, bringing the total to ten and enabling the expanded port to handle up to two million TEU containers a year.

The agreement comes as part of a larger government-to-government memorandum of understanding between Government of the United Arab Emirates and the Government of Somaliland to further strengthen their strategic ties. Somalia's attempts to obstruct and block the deal were frustrated and failed to stop the project from commencing.

A rail link to Addis Ababa, the capital of Ethiopia, has remained a point of discussion and may materialize. On January 1, 2024, it was announced that Ethiopia signed an agreement with Somaliland to utilize Berbera's sea port.

== Geography ==
=== Location and habitat ===
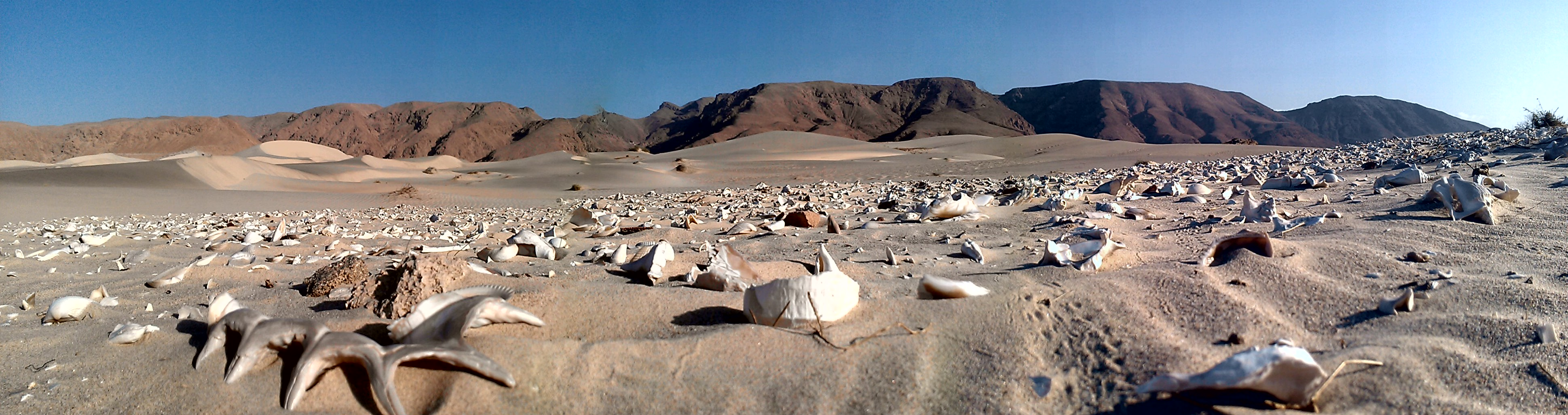
The Berbera landscape

Berbera is located in the coastal region of northern Somalia. An old port city, it has the only sheltered harbour on the southern side of the Gulf of Aden. The landscape around town, along with Somaliland's coastal lowlands, is semi-arid land.

Popular local beaches, such as Bathela and Batalale, have earned the city the nickname Beach City.

=== Climate ===
Berbera features a hot arid climate (Köppen BWh). It has long, sweltering summers and short, hot winters, as well as very little rainfall. Average high temperatures consistently exceed 40 °C or 104 °F during nearly four months of summertime (June, July, August and September). Daytime heat on summer nights is high, with average low temperatures of around 30 °C or 86 °F. During the coolest months of the year, average high temperatures remain above 29 °C or 84.2 °F and average low temperatures also surpass 20 °C or 68 °F. Although rainfall is low, the relative humidity is very high throughout the year and the atmosphere is simultaneously moist. The combination of the desert heat and the excessive moisture make apparent temperatures reach extremely high levels. Annual average rainfall is minimal, with only 52 millimetres (2.0 inches) of precipitation. There are between 5 and 8 rainy days on average annually. Bright sunshine likely occur during about 84% of the total daytime hours and average annual cloudiness is very low.

Climate data for Berbera
Month	Jan	Feb	Mar	Apr	May	Jun	Jul	Aug	Sep	Oct	Nov	Dec	Year
Record high °C (°F)	35.3 (95.5)	35.0 (95.0)	35.0 (95.0)	42.2 (108.0)	47.3 (117.1)	49.1 (120.4)	47.7 (117.9)	46.7 (116.1)	46.0 (114.8)	41.7 (107.1)	36.7 (98.1)	36.1 (97.0)	49.1 (120.4)
Mean daily maximum °C (°F)	27.9 (82.2)	29.2 (84.6)	30.7 (87.3)	31.0 (87.8)	35.7 (96.3)	42.8 (109.0)	42.9 (109.2)	41.9 (107.4)	39.7 (103.5)	33.1 (91.6)	30.0 (86.0)	28.6 (83.5)	34.5 (94.1)
Daily mean °C (°F)	25.0 (77.0)	25.0 (77.0)	26.1 (79.0)	28.3 (82.9)	31.1 (88.0)	33.5 (92.3)	36.1 (97.0)	35.6 (96.1)	33.3 (91.9)	28.8 (83.8)	26.7 (80.1)	26.7 (80.1)	30.0 (86.0)
Mean daily minimum °C (°F)	21.3 (70.3)	21.6 (70.9)	23.3 (73.9)	25.2 (77.4)	27.7 (81.9)	31.0 (87.8)	31.8 (89.2)	31.1 (88.0)	29.3 (84.7)	24.0 (75.2)	22.2 (72.0)	21.6 (70.9)	25.8 (78.4)
Record low °C (°F)	14.4 (57.9)	15.6 (60.1)	16.7 (62.1)	18.9 (66.0)	20.6 (69.1)	22.2 (72.0)	20.6 (69.1)	20.0 (68.0)	17.8 (64.0)	16.7 (62.1)	16.1 (61.0)	15.0 (59.0)	14.4 (57.9)
Average rainfall mm (inches)	8 (0.3)	2 (0.1)	5 (0.2)	12 (0.5)	8 (0.3)	1 (0.0)	1 (0.0)	2 (0.1)	1 (0.0)	2 (0.1)	5 (0.2)	5 (0.2)	52 (2.0)
Average rainy days (≥ 1.0 mm)	0.6	0.6	0.5	0.7	0.8	0.1	0.3	0.5	0.4	0.2	0.3	0.4	5.2
Average relative humidity (%)	78	79	79	81	73	49	44	45	51	72	74	76	67
Percentage possible sunshine	80	80	80	83	83	87	80	87	87	87	87	80	83
Source 1: Arab Meteorology Book (average temperatures, humidity and precipitation), Deutscher Wetterdienst (precipitation days, 1908–1950 and extremes)
Source 2: Food and Agriculture Organization: Somalia Water and Land Management (percent sunshine)

== Demographics ==
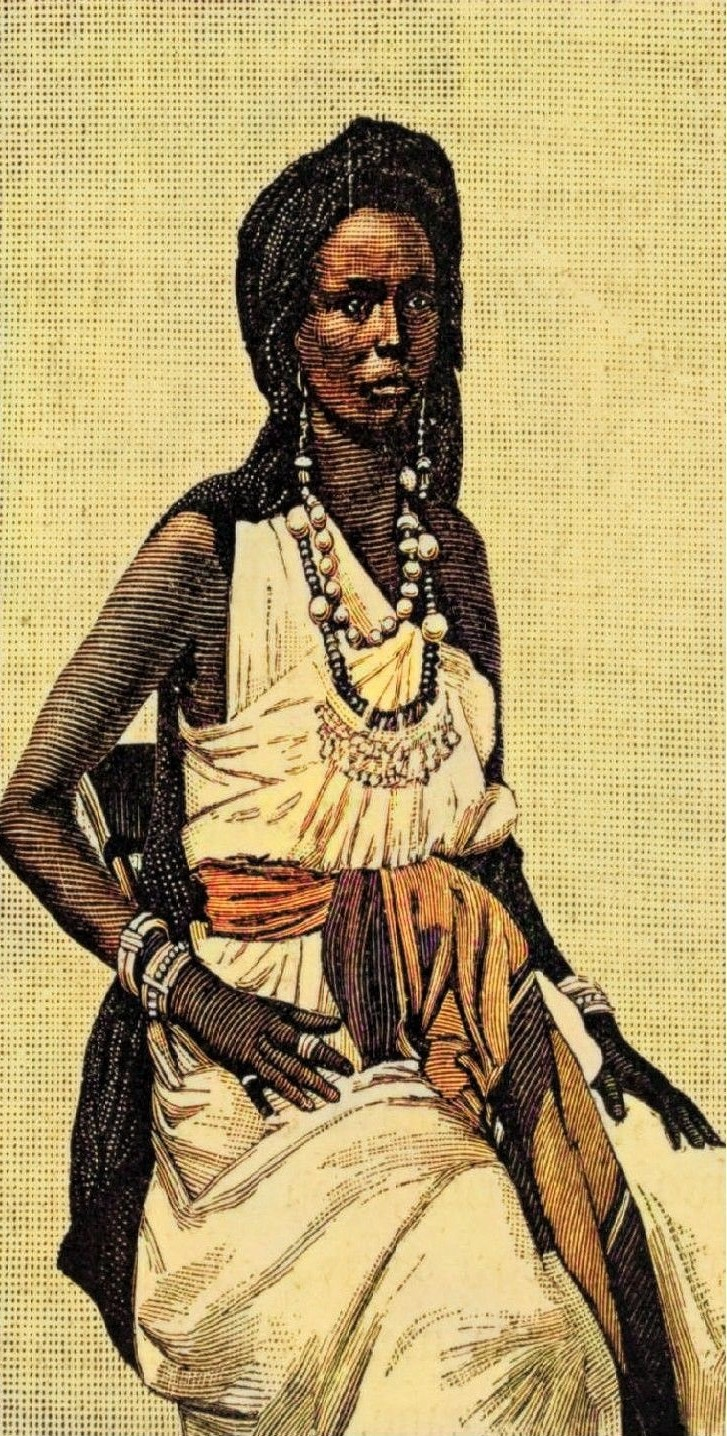
Habr Awal woman from Berbera, 19th century

Historically, Berbera was inhabited by the Reer Ahmed Nuh and Yunis Nuh lineages of the Sa'ad Musa, Habr Awal.

In more recent times, the Issa Musse sub-clan of the Habr Awal have come to make up the majority of the town's inhabitants, while the Habr Yunis, primarily belonging to the Musa Abdallah branch as well as the Habr Je'lo also being present.

== Education ==
There are 30 primary schools operating in Berbera city totaling 63,641 students. The broader Berbera district has 49 schools serving 90,310 students.

== Economy ==
A number of products are exported through the Port of Berbera, including livestock, gum arabic, frankincense, and myrrh. Its seaborne trade is chiefly with Jeddah in Saudi Arabia, and Aden in Yemen, 240 kilometres (150 miles) to the north. Additionally, goods from Ethiopia are also exported through the facility. The seaside boasts watersport tourist activity such as scuba diving, snorkeling, surfing and coral reefs.

== Transportation ==
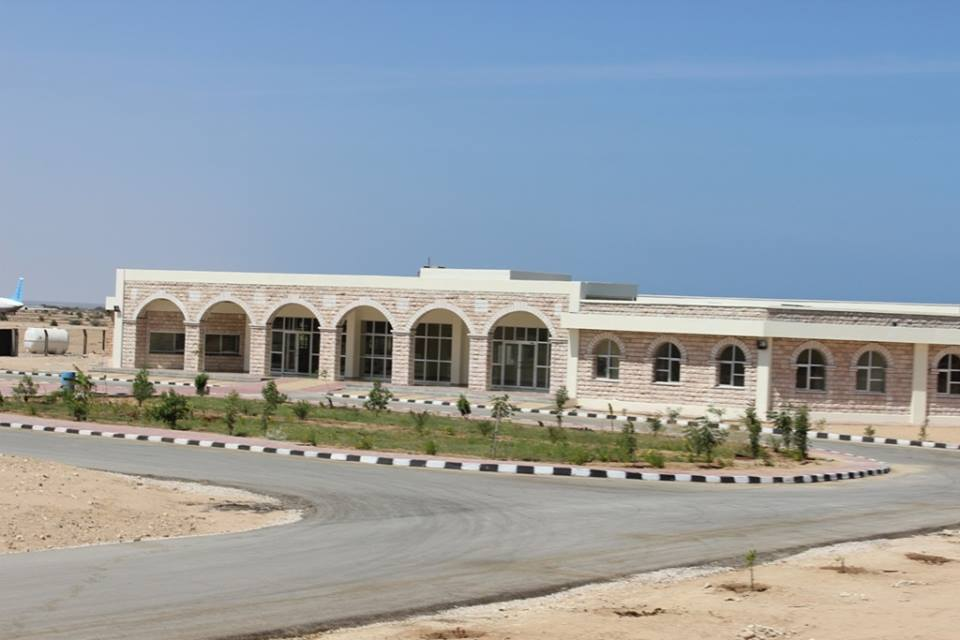
Berbera Airport Terminal

Berbera is the terminus of roads from Hargeisa and Burco. The city has one of Somaliland's major class seaports, the Port of Berbera. It historically served as a naval and missile base for the Somali government. Following an agreement between the Somali Republic and the USSR in 1962, the port's facilities were patronized by the Soviets and was later significantly upgraded in 1969. The Berbera seaport was later expanded for U.S. military use, after the Somali authorities strengthened ties with the American government.

For air transportation, the city is served by the Berbera Airport. It has an extensive 4,140-metre (13,580-foot) runway.
