= Maydh =

Maydh Maydh (Somali) ميط (Arabic)
- Town
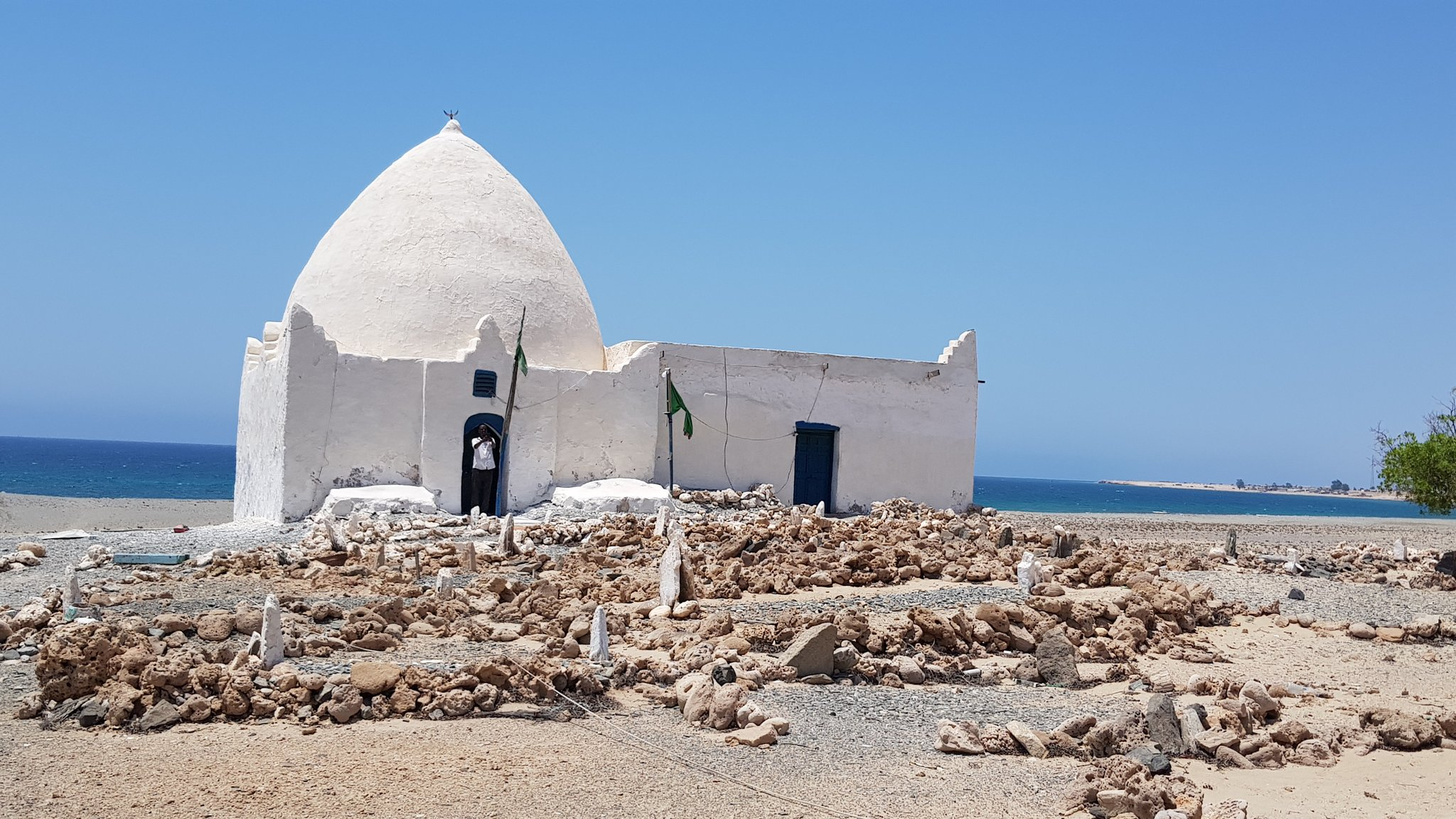
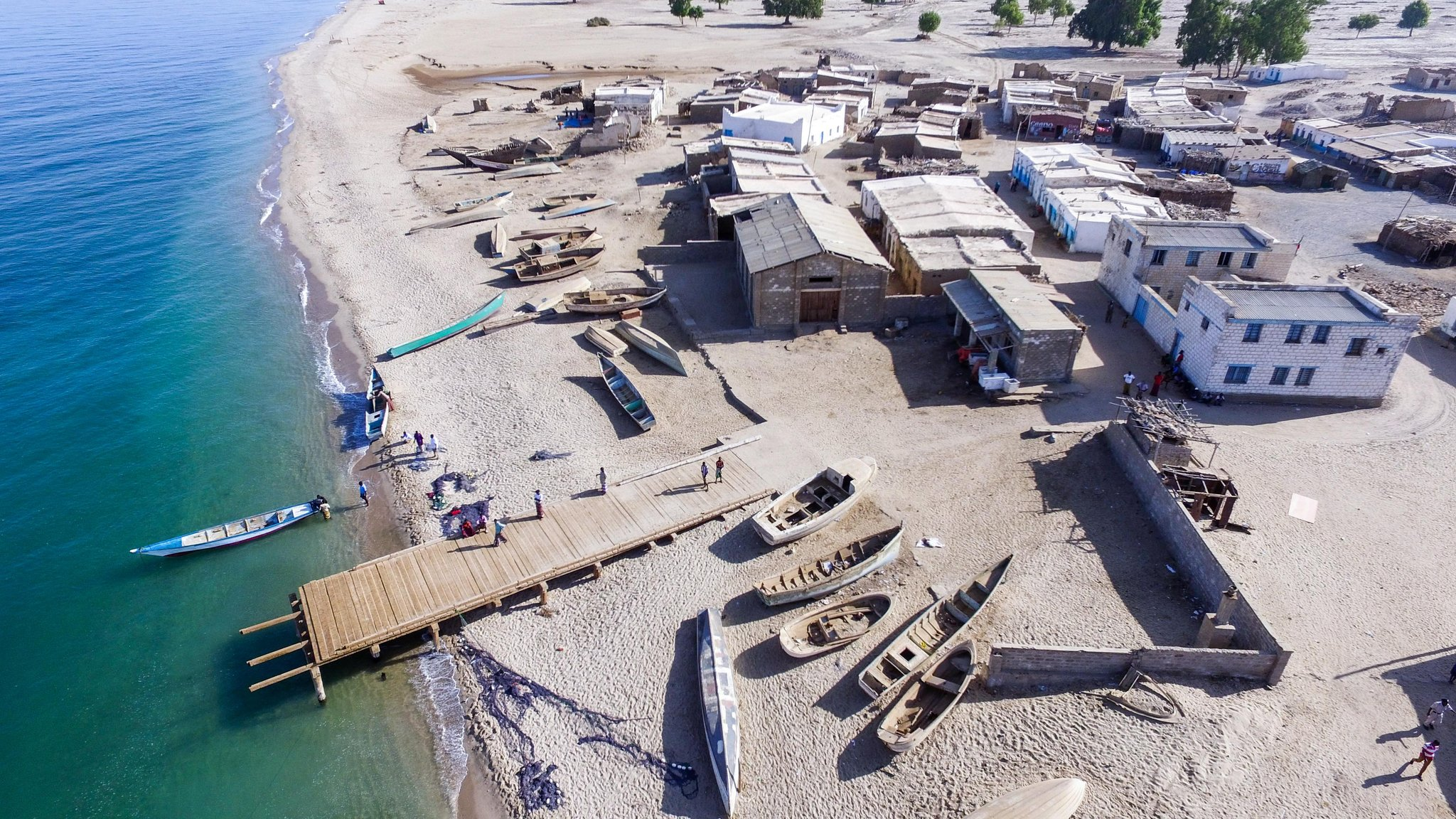
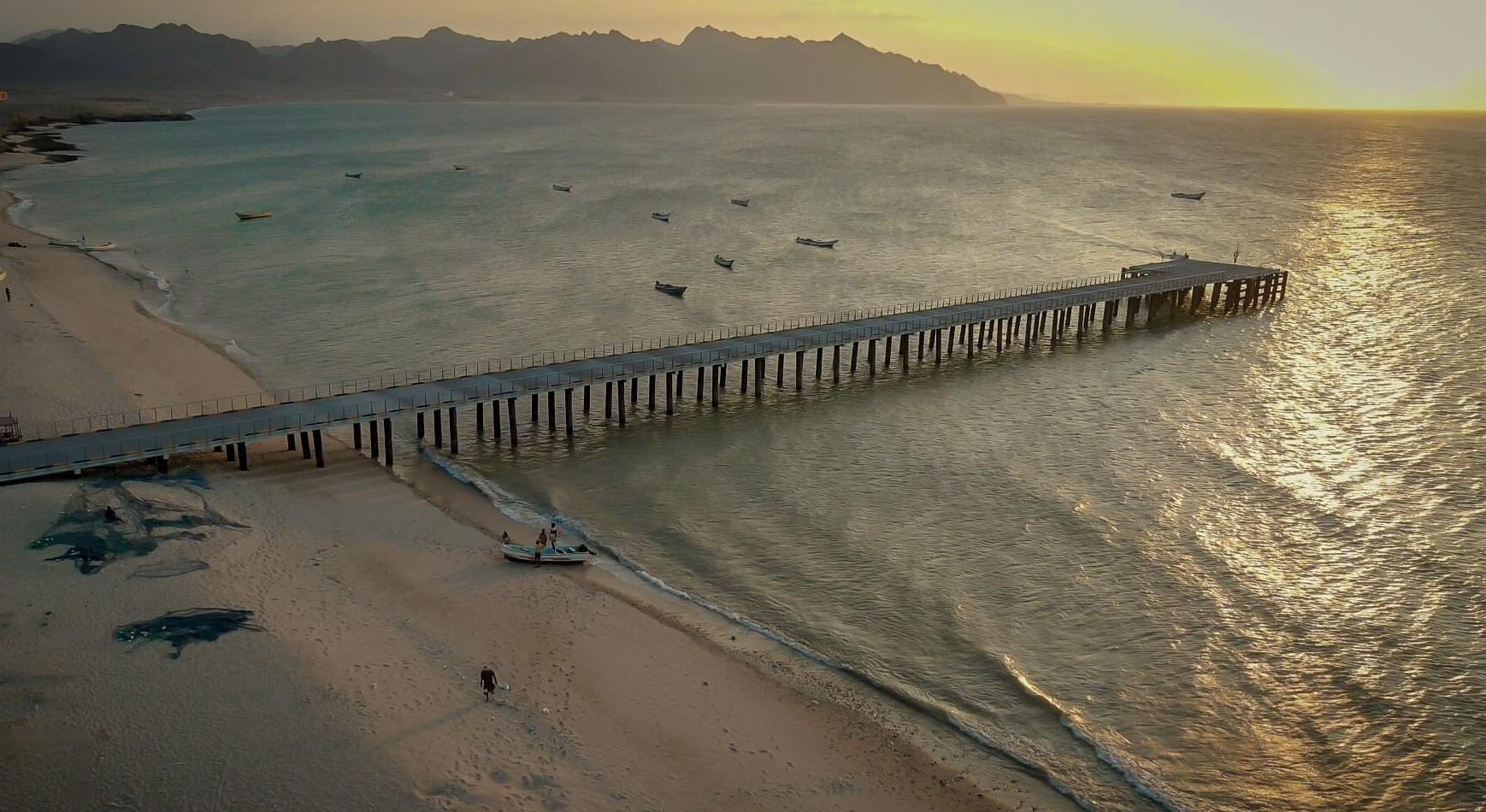
- The tomb of Sheikh Ishaq, the founding father of the Isaaq clan family, and the waterfront of Maydh town

- Location in Somaliland Maydh (Somaliland)
- Coordinates: 11°00′18″N 47°06′36″E
- Country: Somaliland
- Region: Sanaag
- District: Erigavo

Population (2002)
  - Total: 5,000
- Time zone: UTC+3 (EAT)

Maydh (also transliterated as Maedh, Mette, Mait or Meit) (Somali: Maydh, Arabic: ميط) is an ancient port city in the eastern Sanaag region of Somaliland.

== History ==
=== Antiquity ===
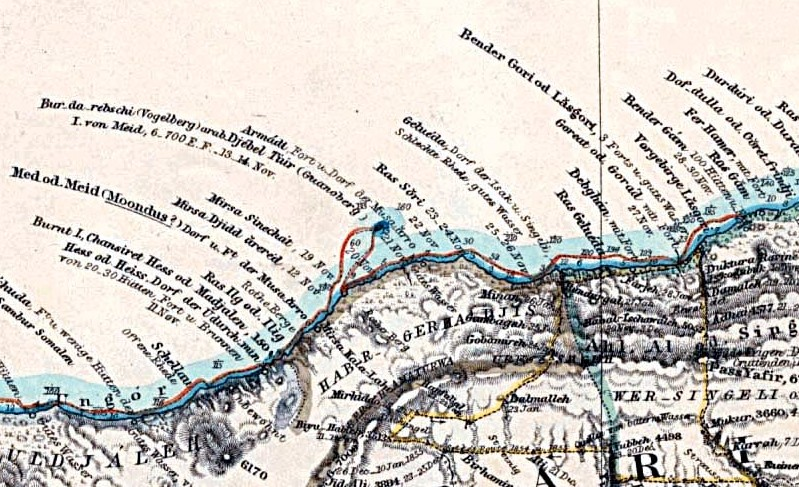
Map of the Daallo Mountain Ranges and coastal Sanaag showing the Musa Arreh (Habar Yunis) settled in Maydh in the year 1860

Pierre d’Avity stated that in ancient times, the town was known as Acanne, in the same way Hafun was known as Opone. According to Augustus Henry Keane, Maydh represents an early center of dispersal of the Somali people. National genealogies collected by the scholars Cox and Abud assert that many clan patriarchs are buried in or nearby the town.

=== Medieval ===
The Book of Curiosities uniquely depicts the Indian Ocean as an enclosed narrow sea, per Ptolemaic tradition, drawn in two halves; eastern (India and China) and western (East Africa) later joined elliptically. In the surviving copy, the halves are misplaced, linking China to Arabia and Africa to India. The Somali section, rich in original detail, names Berbera’s coast, and several mountains are marked, including the Cape of Guardafui at the tip of the Horn of Africa. Maydh, Heis, and other capes are also visualized.

The city of Maydh was home to Sheikh Isaaq ibn Ahmed Al Hashimi (Sheekh Isaxaaq), who moved to Somaliland from the Arabian Peninsula in the 12th or 13th century CE. He is considered to be the founding father of the large Somali Isaaq clan family that predominantly inhabits Somaliland, as well as parts of Djibouti and Ethiopia. Sheikh Isaaq's domed tomb is also located here. According to tradition, the old town was built by Sheikh Ishaaq and his followers upon earlier foundations.

Legendary 15th century Arab explorer Ahmad ibn Mājid wrote of Maydh and several other notable landmarks and ports of the northern Somali coast, including Berbera, the Sa'ad ad-Din islands (aka the Zeila Archipelago near Zeila), Alula, Ruguda, Heis, El-Darad and El-Sheikh.

Somaliland in general is home to numerous such archaeological sites, with similar edifices found at Haylaan, Qa’ableh, Qombo'ul, Gelweita and El Ayo. However, many of these old structures have yet to be properly explored, a process which would help shed further light on the local history of the region and facilitate their preservation for posterity.

In the Futuh Al-Habash, the chronicler Shihab al-Dīn Aḥmad ibn ʿAbd al-Qādir ibn Sālim ibn ʿUthmān notes that the Harti, who fought on the left flank of Imam Ahmad ibn Ibrahim al-Ghazi's army during the Battle of Shimbra Kure, were known as the people of Mait; a people not given to yielding.

Francisco Álvares visited the city and provided a description below of his experience:

We met at a place called Meti, which is well sited; it might be of the size of fifty or sixty hearths; it has two mosques, and they are not good ones, but they have many large burial grounds. The people of this place all fled; and they also have there a big school in which they teach the children, because there were inkpots and boards on which they wrote. There were also three old women in the place, two cripples and one blind. They did not understand their language. At night they also captured a young woman with a baby, near a mountain; the Governor ordered that cotton cloths should be given to them to clothe them in their fashion, and that they should go away to the people of the place. And he told them to tell them to come for he would ensure their safety; and he wanted peace with them; and those who should come and return boldly he would treat very kindly.

They were not willing to believe or trust him. And so when the Governor saw that they did not come, he ordered fifty musketeers and cross-bowmen to try to capture some of the people of the country so that he might have some knowledge of what people they were and of what nation. And after making a circuit of about six miles these men returned and said they had not been able to find anyone. And that they had found where they used to make fire and hollows and places where they sought for water to drink, and because of the great mountains they were in hiding; and it was impossible to find them.

In this place there were only two wells and little water; the Governor was displeased at this as we were in great need of water. They began to dig in the ground to see if they could find water, and God willed that we should find so much and so good that they made about forty holes, from which they filled in three days more than 1000 casks of water; and so we were replenished with water and so it showed that this was a port for ships. And at this time some little ships and frigates were there. There are also on the shore great bones of fish, which seem to be of whales or something like them; and a great quantity of them. On our departure they took what they needed for firewood from the houses and mosques, and what was not needed they burnt together with the houses, ships and frigates. In this place there is nothing but stere, and skins of goats and buffaloes. During the whole time that the supply of water was being taken on, we were on land without having any alarm.

Leo Africanus remarked that the town was under the dominion of the Muslim Sultanate of Adal. Portuguese navigator Duarte Barbosa also described the Somali coast and noted Met (Maydh) as a town with an abundance of meat but little trade. This would indicate that Maydh was likely a pilgrimage site where travelers would come to pray.

=== Early Modern ===
Maydh shares many similarities with nearby Heis the Habr Yunis attained a lot of frankincense in the mountains south of Maydh. Arab and Banyan merchants would visit the port before continuing on to the western Somali coast. Maydh was the preeminent export point for large hides in eastern British Somaliland and came second in the total quantity of skins exported after Heis with over 15,000 being shipped out. The town had dialogue with Berbera with a large amount of cross trade occurring usually by dhow and the largest commodity being livestock.

Murray in his book The Journal of the Royal Geographical Society notes that many men from the western Isaaq clans would travel to Maydh to spend the last years of their lives in hopes of being buried near Sheikh Ishaaq. The book states:

The stranger is at once struck with the magnitude of the burial-ground at Meyet, which extends for fully a mile each way. Attachment to the memory of their forefather Isaakh yet induces many aged men of the western tribes to pass the close of their lives at Meyet, in order that their tombs may be found near that of their chief, and this will account for the unusual size of this cemetery. Many of the graves have head-stones of madrepore, on which is cut in relief the name of the tenant below, and of these many are to be found 250 years old.

=== Modern period ===
The town is now mostly fishing town and is exclusively settled by the Jibril Aden sub division of the Habar Yoonis Garxajis of the Isaaq clan. In 2020 the British, Dutch and Norwegian missions announced the start of a jetty in Maydh to bolster economic activity and construction is in progress.

== See also ==
- Administrative divisions of Somaliland
- Regions of Somaliland
- Districts of Somaliland
- Somalia–Somaliland border

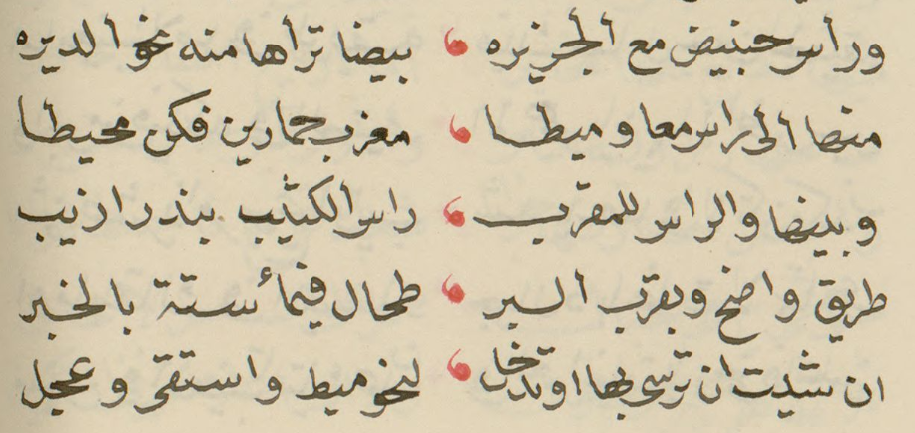
Ibn Majid's notes on Maydh

- Heis
- Karin
- Haylan
- Qa’ableh
- Qombo'ul
