= Heis (town) =

Heis Xiis (Somali) حيس (Arabic)
- Town
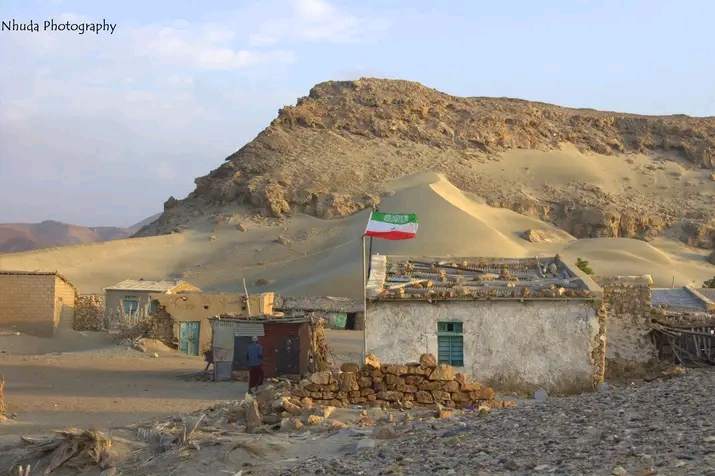
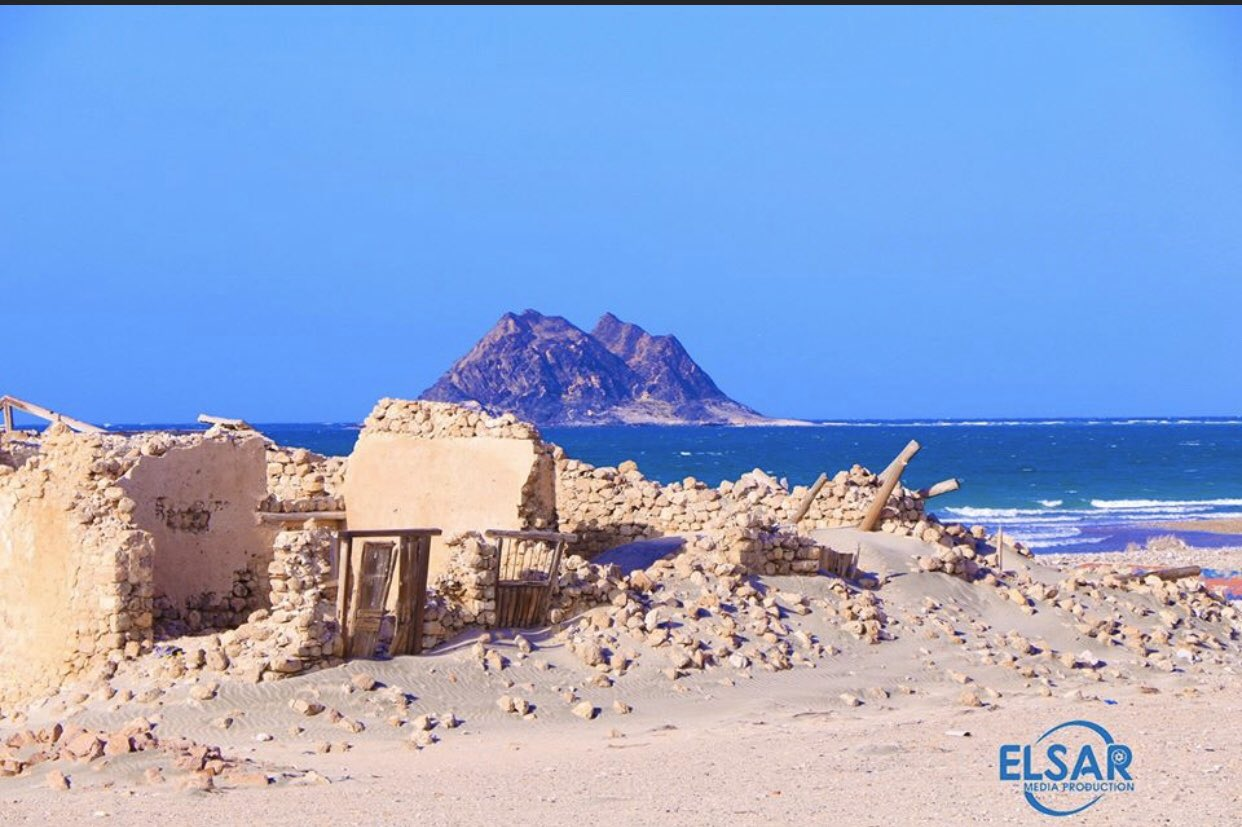
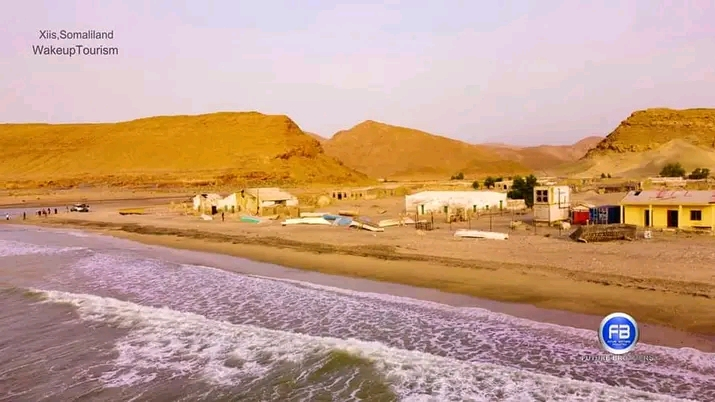
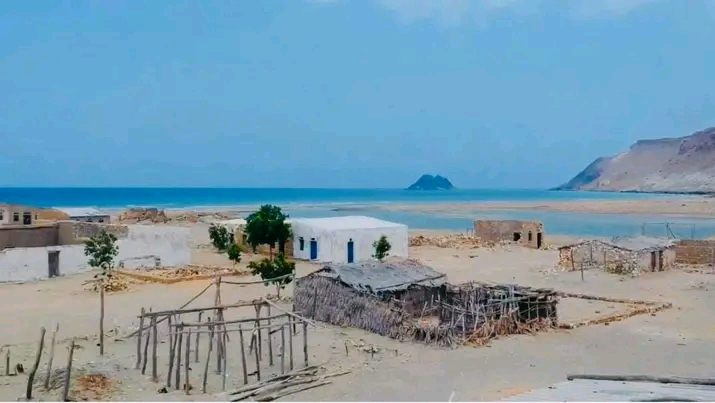
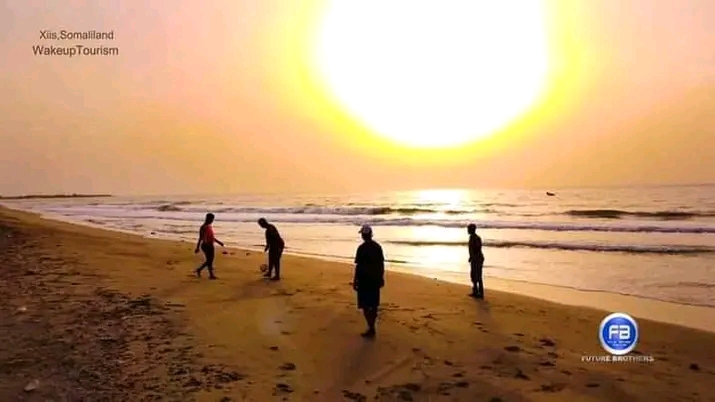
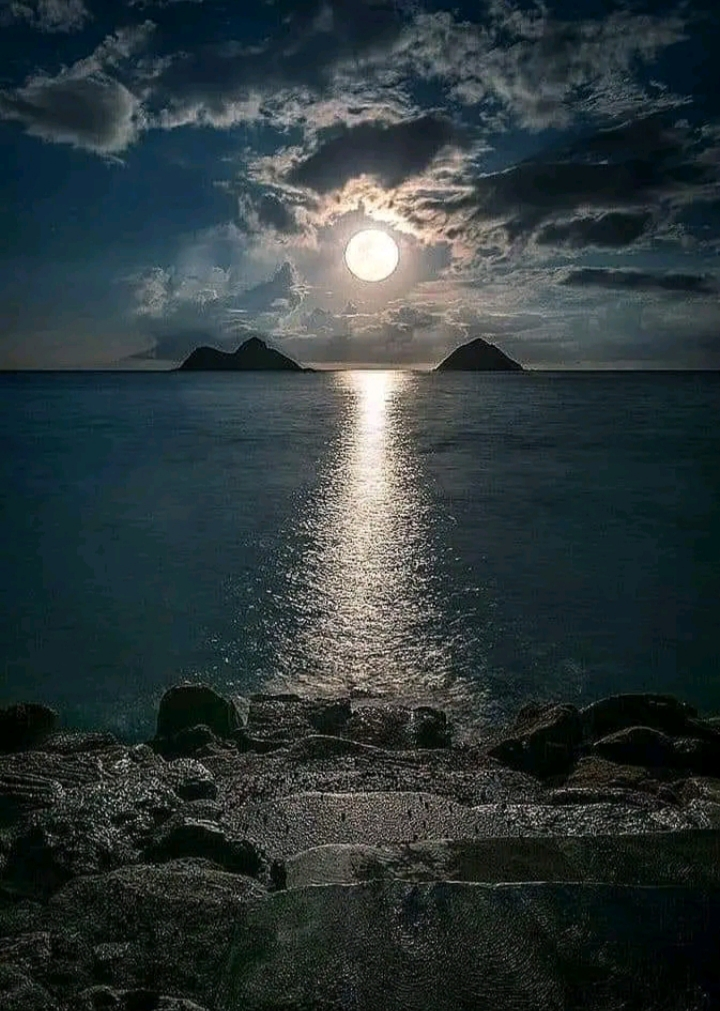
- 1, Uduruxmin Mountain of Heis. 2, Old ruining buildings of Heis. 3 and 4, Heis town. 5, Heis beach, Sanaag, Somaliland. And 6, Macjalayn Sea Mountains of Heis, Somalia.

- Location in Somalia. Heis (Somaliland)
- Coordinates: 10°53′47″N 46°55′16″E
- Country: Somaliland
- Region: Sanaag
- District: Erigavo District

Population (2002)
  - Total: 4,000
- Time zone: UTC+3 (EAT)

Heis (Note: Somali: Xiis, Arabic: حيس, romanized: his) is a historic coastal town located in the Sanaag region of Somaliland. The town was important for trade and communication with the Somali interior and was used to export frankincense to Arabia.

== History ==
=== Antiquity ===
The site said to be identical with the ancient trading post of Mundus (Ancient Greek: Μούνδος) that is described in the Periplus of the Erythraean Sea, an anonymous account by a Greek Alexandrian salesman from the 1st century CE.

"Two days' sail, or three, beyond Malao is the market-town of Mundus, where the ships lie at anchor more safely behind a projecting island close to the shore. There are imported into this place the things previously set forth, and from it likewise are exported the merchandise already stated, and the incense called mocrotu. And the traders living here are more quarrelsome."

— Chap.9.

A large collection of cairns of various types lie near the city. Excavations here have yielded pottery and sherds of Roman glassware from a time between the 1st and 5th centuries. Among these artefacts is high-quality millefiori glass. Dated to 0-40 CE, it features red flower disks superimposed on a green background. Additionally, an ancient fragment of a footed bowl was discovered in the surrounding area. The sherd is believed to have been made in Aswan (300-500 CE) or Lower Nubia (500-600 CE), suggesting early trading ties with kingdoms in the Nile Valley. Ancient edifices have also been found in Heis.

=== Medieval ===
Legendary Arab explorer Ahmad ibn Mājid wrote of Heis and a few other notable landmarks and ports of the northern Somali coast, including Berbera, the Sa'ad ad-Din islands aka the Zeila Archipelago near Zeila, Alula, Ruguda, Maydh, El-Sheikh and El-Darad.

=== Early Modern ===
The Habr Je'lo derived a large supply of frankincense from the trees south in the mountains near Heis. This trade was lucrative and with gum and skins being traded in high quantity, Arab and Indian merchants would visit these ports early in the season to get these goods cheaper than at Berbera or Zeyla before continuing westwards along the Somali coast. During the British Somaliland period the recorded statistics of Heis show it as a leader alongside Maydh in the east with hundreds of thousands of hides and being the leading exporter of tanned skins with 16,000 reaching Berbera taken by Habr Je'lo traders by dhow. As well Heis exported a large quantity of skins and sheep to Aden. Heis also imported a significant amount of goods from both the Arabian coast and western Somali ports and reached nearly 2 million rupees by 1903.

John Hanning Speke, an English explorer who made an exploratory expedition to the area in an attempt to reach the Nugaal Valley, described the port town:

Without landing, Lieutenant Speke coasted along to Bunder Hais, where he went on shore. Hais is a harbour belonging to the Musa Abokr. It contains a "fort," a single-storied, flat-roofed, stone and mud house, about 20 feet square, one of those artless constructions to which only Somal could attach importance. There are neither muskets nor cannon among the braves of Hais. The "town" consists of half a dozen mud huts, mostly skeletons. The anchoring ground is shallow, but partly protected by a spur of hill, and the sea abounds in fish. Four Buggaloes (native craft) were anchored here, waiting for a cargo of Dumbah sheep and clarified butter, the staple produce of the place. Hais exports to Aden, Mocha, and other parts of Arabia; it also manufactures mats, with the leaves of the Daum palm and other trees. Lieutenant Speke was well received by one Ali, the Agil, or petty chief of the place: he presented two sheep to the traveller.

— Sir Richard Francis Burton, First Footsteps in East Africa, Or, An Exploration of Harar

=== Modern ===
In modern times Heis is no longer as commercially active compared to the past but it remains a coastal settlement of the Habr Je'lo and locals also fish. The large Asli Maydi frankincense company harvests the trees in the mountains south of the town and across Sanaag.

In 1988, the Somali government closed the port of Berbera. For this reason, small natural ports such as Maydh, Heis, Las Khorey, and Zeila were used for the export of livestock. However, their volume was very small compared to the exports from the port of Berbera.

== Demographics ==
The town is predominantly inhabited by the Uduruxmiin sub-division of the Habr Je'lo Isaaq.

Heis is extremely hot, so residents live in the mountains for about six months, mainly in the summer, and spend the rest of the year near the coast.

== See also ==
- Administrative divisions of Somaliland
- Regions of Somaliland
- Districts of Somaliland
- Somalia–Somaliland border
- Maydh
- Karin
