= Ahmad ibn Majid =

Arab navigator and cartographer (c.1432–c.1500)

Ahmad ibn Mājid
- أحمد بن ماجد
- Born: c. 1432; Julfar (present-day Ras Al Khaimah)
- Died: c. 1500
- Other name: The Lion of the Sea
- Occupation: Navigator/Cartographer
- Years active: c. 1450 – c. 1500
- Known for: Navigator
- Notable work: The Book of the Benefits of the Principles and Foundations of Seamanship (Kitāb al-fawā’id fī uṣūl ʿilm al-baḥr wa-l-qawā’id)

Aḥmad ibn Mājid (Arabic: أحمد بن ماجد), also known as the "Arab Admiral" (أمير البحر العربي, ʿAmīr al-Baḥr al-ʿArabī) and the "Lion of the Sea", was an Arab navigator and cartographer born c. 1432 in Julfar, the present-day Ras Al Khaimah in the United Arab Emirates. He was raised in a family famous for seafaring; at the age of seventeen he was able to navigate ships. The exact date is not known, but Ibn Mājid probably died around 1500. Although long identified in the West as the navigator who helped Vasco da Gama find his way from Africa to India, contemporary research has shown Ibn Mājid is unlikely even to have met Da Gama. Ibn Mājid was the author of nearly forty works of poetry and prose.

== Name ==
At the beginning of his magnum opus, the Fawāʾid (see below), Ibn Mājid gives his name in full as Ḥājj al-Ḥaramayn al-Sharīfayn Shihāb al-Dīn Aḥmad ibn Mājid ibn Muḥammad ibn ʿAmr ibn Faḍl ibn Duwayk ibn Yūsuf ibn Ḥasan ibn Ḥusayn ibn Abī Muʿallaq al-Saʿdī ibn Abī Rakāʾib al-Najdī (Arabic: حاج الحرمين الشريفين شهاب الدين أحمد بن ماجد بن محمد بن عمر بن فضل بن دويك بن يوسف بن حسن بن حسين بن أبي معلق السعدي بن أبي الركايب النجدي). The Najdī and Saʿdī titles relate his lineage to the central Arabian Peninsula and to the Yemeni Tihamah respectively.

== Works ==
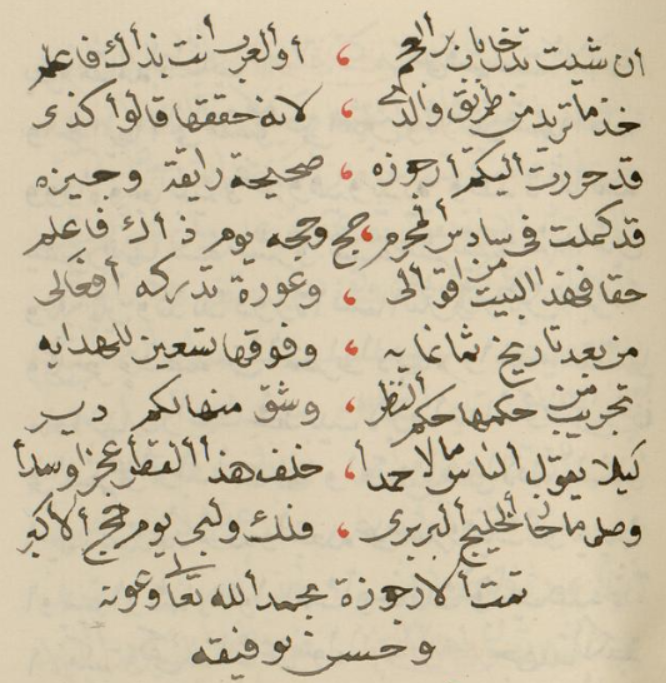
A selection from the Kitāb al-Fawā’id fī Uṣūl ‘Ilm al-Baḥr wa ’l-Qawā’id with Ibn Majid referring to the Gulf of Aden by its old name the Gulf of Berbera

Ibn Mājid wrote several books on marine science and the movements of ships, which helped people of the Persian Gulf to reach the coasts of India, East Africa and other destinations. Among his many books on navigation, Kitāb al-Fawā’id fī Uṣūl ʿIlm al-Baḥr wa’l-Qawāʿid (The Book of the Benefits of the Principles and Foundations of Seamanship) is considered one of his best. It is an encyclopedia, describing the history and basic principles of navigation, latitude and longitude by way of celestial navigation, lunar mansions, loxodromes, the difference between coastal and open-sea sailing, the locations of ports from East Africa to Indonesia, accounts of the monsoon and other seasonal winds, typhoons and other topics for professional navigators. He drew from his own experience and that of his father, also a famous navigator, and the lore of generations of Indian Ocean sailors. The book encompassed the entire science of navigation in the Indian Ocean at the time.

Ibn Mājid was known as a muʿallim (“teacher”, the title for pilots), i.e. teacher of navigation. Most of his navigational calculations depended on sophisticated astronomical observations, especially using the lunar mansions (manāzil al-qamar) and the thirty-two stellar rhumbs (akhnān).

== Legacy ==
Although Ibn Mājid was long held to have helped the Portuguese navigator Vasco da Gama cross from Africa to the Indian subcontinent, contemporary research has shown that he would have been in his seventies at the time of Da Gama’s trip. The actual pilot who sailed with Da Gama was a Gujarati and may have returned to Portugal with da Gama. The man was provided to Da Gama by the Ruler of Malindi and was assumed by Da Gama and his men to be a Christian. He guided Da Gama’s ships to Mount Eli on the Indian coast after a 23-day voyage.

Researchers have also used the three rutters of Ibn Mājid, particularly the ‘Sofala Rutter’, to comprehensively debunk the entire story of Ibn Mājid and any association with Da Gama. The evidence in these, letters written by da Gama himself and Ibn Mājid’s age (he considered himself too old to navigate in 1498, when da Gama arrived in Malindi—Ibn Mājid would have been 77), all provide a strong refutation of the entire story and it is now accepted as highly unlikely that Ibn Mājid had ever even met Da Gama, let alone given him the route to India. However, his works are thought to have been a valuable source for the Portuguese when they arrived in the region.

Remembered as “The Lion of the Sea”, Ibn Mājid's true legacy was the substantial body of literature on navigation that he left behind. Arab sailing was at a pinnacle during Ibn Mājid's lifetime, when both Europeans and Ottomans had only a limited understanding of geography in the Indian Ocean. His Kitāb al-Fawāʾid was widely utilized by Arab sailors, and comprised celestial navigation, weather patterns, and charts of dangerous areas in which to sail. This tome, in addition to his poetic works, were the true legacy of the sailor. Two of Ibn Mājid’s famous hand-written books are now prominent exhibits in the Bibliothèque nationale de France.

== In popular culture ==
In the television series Star Trek: Picard, set in the future, the character Cristóbal "Chris" Ríos (portrayed by Santiago Cabrera) is a former Starfleet officer who once served on the Federation starship USS Ibn Majid, NCC-75710, as revealed in the 2020 episode "Broken Pieces".

== See also ==
- Islamic scholars
- List of Arab scientists and scholars

== General references ==
- Ahmad ibn Majid (15th Century CE – 9th Century AH): The lion of the Seas. http://www.alrahalah.com/.
- Al-Salimi, Abdulrahman (2002). "Different succession chronologies of the Nabhani dynasty in Oman". Proceedings of the Seminar for Arabian Studies. Vol. 32. ISBN 2503513360.
- Al Salimi, Abdulrahman, and Eric Staples. 2019. A Maritime Lexicon: Arabic Nautical Terminology in the Indian Ocean. Hildesheim: Georg Olms Verlag.
- Encyclopaedia of the History of Science, Technology, and Medicine in Non-Western Cultures, Helaine Selin, Springer Science & Business Media - 2013, p. 424, ISBN 9789401714167.
- Khoury, Ibrahim. 2001. Aḥmad ibn Mājid, ḥayātuh, muʾalafātuh, istiḥāla liqāʾihi bi-Fāskū dī Ghāmā [Aḥmad ibn Mājid, his Life, his Writings, and the Impossibility of His Meeting with Vasco da Gama]. Ras al-Khaima, Markaz al-dirāsa wa-al-wathāʾiq.
- Malhão Pereira, José Manuel. 2004. As técnicas náuticas pregâmicas no Índico. Lisbon: Academia de Marinha.
- The Report: Emerging Oman 2007. Oxford Business Group. 2007. ISBN 978-1-902339-62-7.
- Shihāb, Ḥasan Ṣāliḥ. 1982. Fann al-milāḥah ʿinda al-ʿarab (The Art of Navigation Among the Arabs). Beirut: Dār al-ʿAwdah.
- Khal Torabully, “The Maritime Memory of the Arabs”, documentary film (52') showing Arab navigation in the Indian Ocean, with a special attention to Ahmad bin Majid, Chamarel Film/Productions La Lanterne, 2000.
