= Siege of Zeila (1856) =

Military campaign in Somaliland

Date	February–March 1856
Location	Zeila, Ottoman Zeila
Result	Ottoman victory: Siege lifted
Territorial changes	Abubakr Pasha reasserts control over Zeila in April 1856

Belligerents
(Isaaq Sultanate) Sharmarke Ali Saleh’s Forces: Habr Yonis; Habr Je'lo; Issa	Ottoman Empire: Ottoman Zeila

Commanders and leaders
(Isaaq Sultanate) Sharmarke Ali Saleh; Mohamed Diban; Deria Ali Saleh; Mohamed Sharmarke	(Ottoman Empire) Abu Bakr Pasha

Strength
8 battleships	zeila garrison

Casualties and losses
Unknown	Several ships destroyed

The Siege of Zeila was a military campaign led by Sharmarke Ali Saleh and his allies in an attempt to conquer the city from the Ottoman governor, Abu Bakr Pasha.

== Background ==
=== Sharmarke Ali Saleh's conquest ===
Operating as a tributary of Mokha, itself part of the Ottoman holdings in Western Arabia, the port of Zeila experienced a succession of appointed governors over time. Although the Ottomans based in Yemen maintained nominal control over Zeila, a turning point came when Haji Sharmarke Ali Saleh, an accomplished and driven Somali merchant, acquired the rights to farm the town from the Ottoman governor of Mokha and Hodeidah. The sitting governor, however, showed little willingness to give up authority over Zeila. As a result, in 1841 Sharmarke organized an expedition, securing two dhows along with fifty Somali matchlock-armed men and two cannons, and moved against Zeila to remove its Arab governor, Sayyid Mohammed el-Barr. Upon arrival, Sharmarke ordered his cannons to fire toward the city walls, an action that alarmed Al Barr’s supporters and led them to flee their positions, allowing Sharmarke to take control and assume rulership of Zeila. His administration quickly reshaped the city’s commercial landscape, as he worked to dominate regional trade networks, extending his influence toward Harar and deeper into the interior.

=== Sharmarke's loss of power ===
From 1841, Sharmarke ruled uncontested in Zeila, working to consolidate his coastal holdings stretching from Maydh in the far east and Tadjoura to the far west. However, in the year 1855, Sharmarke was deposed by his Danakil rival, Abu Bakr, who gained control of Zeila via the support of the French.

A key source of conflict between Aboubakr Pasha and Sharmarke Ali Salih, which later contributed to Sharmarke's attempted coup in Zeila, was the wreck of the Caïman. This French steam-powered war corvette last docked in Aden on January 20, 1854, before running aground near Zeila shortly thereafter. As governor of the region at the time, Sharmarke aided the ship and its crew, evacuating Commander Cormier and his men. In appreciation, Cormier granted Sharmarke permission to salvage materials from the wreck, particularly the valuable copper sheathing. Exceeding this authorisation, Sharmarke employed Khamite workers from Aden to fully dismantle the vessel's machinery, extracting large quantities of copper, brass, iron, and wood. While some materials were sold, the rest were stored in Zeila. After Sharmarke's dismissal as governor and Aboubakr's subsequent appointment, Aboubakr seized the remaining salvaged materials along with Sharmarke's other possessions. These were only returned following direct orders from Mahmoud Pasha. This led to this overthrow as Governor of Zeila by Abubakr Ibrahim Chehem, otherwise known as Abubakr Pasha. After this, Sharmarke headed east, rallying troops to retake control over Zeila. Sharmarke gathered his Brother Deria Ali Saleh, his son Muhammad Sharmarke who was the governor of Berbera, and his close ally Muhammad Abdi Liban, who was a powerful Habar Jeclo chieftain and the emir of the port town of El-Darad, East of Berbera. After recovering some of his confiscated property, he gathered a fleet of 8 ships, And headed west towards Zeila, Intending to seize the town through force.

== Siege ==
In 1855, the Asir tribes of western Yemen began a rebellion that brought Ottoman Empire rule in Yemen to the brink of collapse. Taking advantage of this, Haji Sharmarke Ali Saleh secured an alliance with these Yemeni tribesmen and arrived before Zeila with his brother Deria Ali Saleh, his son Mohamed Sharmarke, and his close ally Mohamed Abdi Liban, a Habar Jeclo chief and the Emir of the fortress port town of Ain Tarad, together with a fleet of eight ships filled with troops and ammunition. Sharmarke immediately imposed a blockade upon the port and began a sustained siege of the town, while simultaneously sending his brother Deria inland with a small army to rally and coordinate with interior tribes against the city, thus placing Zeila under pressure from both land and sea.

The governor of the town, Abubakr Ibrahim Chehem, fled upon Sharmarke’s arrival toward Tadjoura, from where he communicated the alarming developments to Aden, reporting that Sharmarke, accompanied by his son and a flotilla of armed vessels, had blockaded the port and cut off all communication by sea. It was further reported that no ships were able to escape toward Aden, and that the harbor was effectively sealed. During the course of the blockade, Sharmarke intercepted vessels attempting to approach the town, plundering at least one and subsequently sinking it, while disabling others by removing their rudders. At the same time, Sharmarke dispatched a small force under his brother Deria, to rally forces from the interior. Deria incited the tribes of the interior, including the Issa clan, who engaged the town on land, resulting in a protracted conflict that endured for nearly a month.

The town of Zeila, though subjected to musket fire and sustained assault from both the sea and inland forces, resisted these attacks, and Sharmarke, despite expending considerable resources in men and materiel, was unable to successfully land and seize the city. His forces maintained a constant presence along the coast, intercepting maritime movement and attempting to tighten the blockade, while inland detachments continued to harass the town’s defenses. The situation remained precarious, as Sharmarke sought to exploit the instability in Yemen Eyalet and the absence of immediate Ottoman naval intervention in the region.

However, the broader circumstances soon shifted. The rebellion of the Asir tribes in Yemen was ultimately suppressed, and the Ottomans, having regained the initiative, began preparations to dispatch reinforcements toward Zeila to restore order and reassert authority. With the prospect of renewed Ottoman military presence and the failure of his efforts to capture the town, Sharmarke abandoned his designs. The blockade was lifted, and the siege of Zeila came to an end.

== Aftermath ==
In the aftermath of the siege, the British authorities in Aden moved to intervene as reports reached them that Haji Sharmarke Ali Saleh had again blockaded the port of Zeila with his son and a number of armed vessels, cutting off all communication and preventing ships from escaping toward Aden. Brigadier Coghlan, unwilling to tolerate what he regarded as piratical practices yet lacking a warship to respond immediately, dispatched a dhow to Hodeida to summon the H.C.S. steamer Queen, as further reports confirmed that Sharmarke and his family maintained their presence along the coast and that the port remained effectively sealed, rendering the British temporarily unable to act despite the growing urgency of the situation.

On April 1, 1856, Lieutenant Playfair boarded the Queen, commanded by Lieutenant Adams, and proceeded toward the coast, during which Deria Ali Saleh, the brother of Sharmarke, was taken aboard while returning from Zeila and informed him that Sharmarke had withdrawn inland and taken refuge at Ain Tarad with his ally Mohamed Abdi Liban; shortly thereafter, Sharmarke himself came aboard and presented his account, denying the accusations made against him and urging Playfair not to accept the claims of Abu Bakr Ibrahim Chehem, whom he described as his principal adversary. Upon arrival off Zeila, Playfair, declining to go ashore so as not to delay proceedings, summoned Aboubeker, who approached cautiously, first sending emissaries and only appearing the following day, while Playfair emphasized that his mission was solely one of inquiry and that the British did not intend to assert authority over territory formally under the Ottoman Empire.

Aboubeker accused Sharmarke of exploiting the rebellion of the Asir tribes in Yemen to attempt the seizure of Zeila, describing how the town had been subjected to a coordinated assault, blockaded at sea by a flotilla of eight vessels and attacked from the interior by allied forces, with ships plundered and sunk, others rendered inoperable, and the town, though under sustained musket fire, resisting until Sharmarke lifted the siege upon learning of Ottoman successes in Yemen; Sharmarke denied these accusations, asserting instead that his actions were limited to seeking the restitution of property left behind in Zeila after his earlier deposition, maintaining that orders issued by Mahmoud Pasha had not been honored, accusing Aboubeker of obstructing their execution through bribery of Ottoman officials, and claiming that he had come under fire from the town’s defenders, forcing him to withdraw, presenting himself as a wronged party rather than an aggressor.

The exchange between the two men was marked by open hostility, with no formal courtesies observed and repeated accusations exchanged, and Playfair, while refraining from delivering a definitive judgment, noted both the intensity of their rivalry and the broader context in which the conflict had unfolded, attributing Sharmarke’s actions in part to the perceived weakening of Ottoman authority in Yemen and the temporary absence of naval enforcement from Aden, while acknowledging that the presence of Sharmarke’s flotilla constituted a blockade of the harbor without fully endorsing the charges brought against him. The situation remained unresolved in the immediate term, but in 1857, following the arrest of Aboubeker Pasha, Sharmarke succeeded in regaining control over Zeila, restoring his authority over the port and its trade networks, where he would rule until 1861, when he was ultimately captured and arrested by French and Ottoman authorities
