= Zeila garrison =

Ottoman zeila garrison
- zeila garrison
- Active: 1559-1875
- Country: Ottoman Zeila Habesh Eyalet Khedivate's Somali Coast
- Allegiance: Ottoman Zeila Habesh Eyalet Khedivate's Somali Coast
- Branch: Army
- Type: regiment
- Size: Abubakr Ibrahim Chehem 120 infantry and 40 artillery with nine litre canon in one barrel Muhammad Rauf Pasha 1,200 infantryfourteen officers, 236 irregular soldiers (''baṣhi bozuk''), eighteen two Howitzer mountain cannons with two rocket launchers, and around 250 camels for transport.
- Engagements: Egyptian–Ethiopian War Mahdist War Egyptian invasion of Harar Hejaz rebellion Siege of Zeila (1856) Battle of Zeila (1841) Ottoman–Ethiopian War (1557–1589)

Insignia
- Flag

The Zeila garrison of the sanjak of Ottoman Zeila was an Ottoman sanjak of the Habesh Eyalet .

The garrison was reinforced and used by the Khedivate's Somali coast and was the land warfare force based in the city of Zeila from 1559 to 1884.

== History ==
The military force that Ra’uf Pasha commanded was made up of five infantry units. It had fourteen officers, 236 irregular soldiers (''baṣhi bozuk''), eighteen two Howitzer mountain cannons with two rocket launchers, and around 250 camels for transport.

Muhammad Rauf Pasha led a well-armed Egyptian force of 1,200 men from Zeila into the interior of eastern Ethiopia and absent opposition, seized Harar on 11 October 1875.

Logistics was handled by local Somali populations as seen with the withdrawal of the 3,500-strong Egyptian garrison from Harar. The evacuation could not have been successfully executed without the cooperation of the Somali issa. The retreat required many camels to transport heavy weapons.
