= Egyptian invasion of Harar =

1874–1885 military conflict in the Horn of Africa

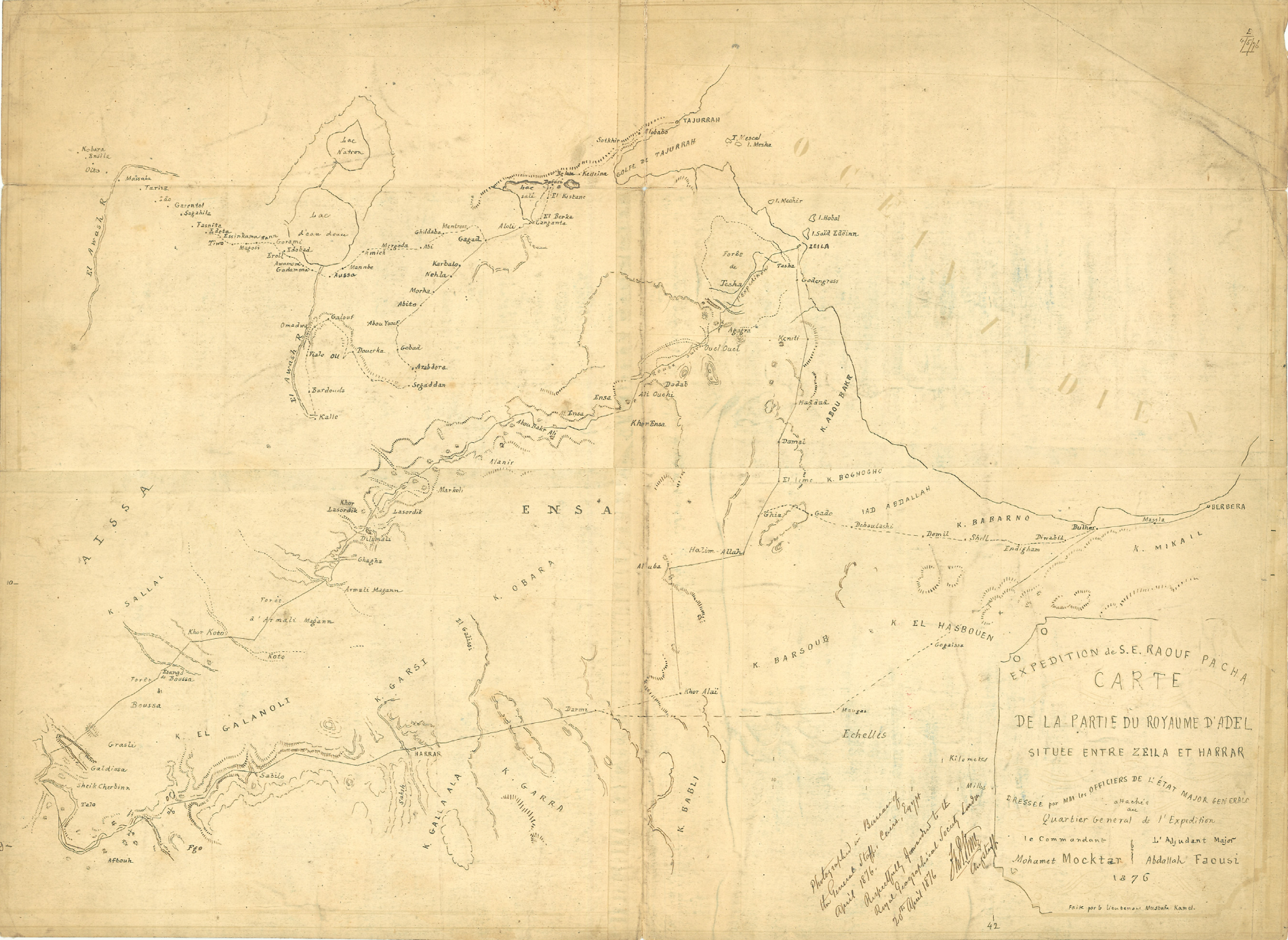
- The Khedivate expedition led by Rauf Pasha to Harar c. 1876
Date	1874–1885
Location	Emirate of Harar and the Somali littoral
Result	Occupation of Hararghe and northern Somali coast; Establishment of the Khedivate's Somali Coast; Egyptian forces retreat to Zeila and Mount Hakim; Egyptian-controlled Harari Emirate disestablished in 1885
Territorial changes	Annexation of Emirate of Harar and northern Somali coast

Belligerents
Khedivate of Egypt; Supported by: Ottoman Zeila	Emirate of Harar; Sultanate of Aussa; Oromo

Commanders and leaders
Ismail Pasha; Werner Munzinger †; Rauf Pasha; Abubakr Ibrahim Chehem; Ali ibn Abu Bakr Harari	Emir Muhammad ibn Ali Abd Ash-Shakur (executed); Sultan Mahammad ibn Hanfere; Raba Orfo Jilo Biko; Garad Adam Ashabiyye (surrendered); Garad Abu Bakr Liben; Garad Jibril; Sheikh Osman Yaro; Emir Muhammed Abu Bakr; Garad Waday Iru

Casualties and losses
Unknown	Unknown

The Egyptian invasion of Harar, was part of a conflict in the Horn of Africa between the Emirate of Harar, Sultan of Aussa, and Oromo tribesmen, and the Khedivate of Egypt from 1874 to 1885. In 1874, the Egyptians invaded Eastern Ethiopia, namely Hararghe and parts of the Somali coast, and ruled it for 11 years.

== Background ==
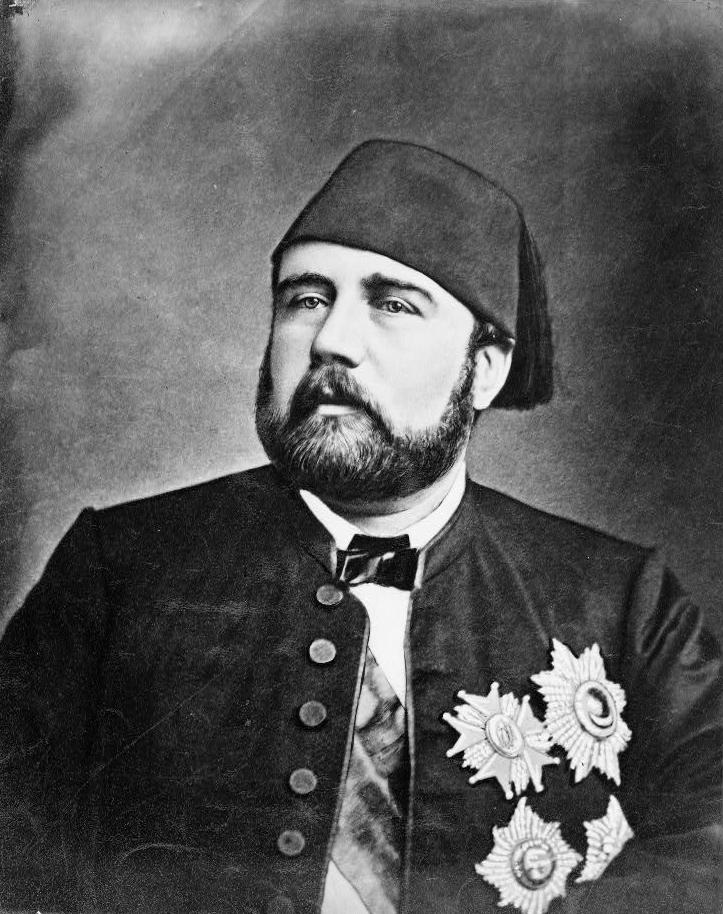
Isma'il Pasha, ruler of Egypt

Facing a power vacuum, the Egyptians decided to move south and take full control of the Nile. After annexing Darfur, they aimed for Eritrea (then known as Ethiopia). The Egyptians and Ethiopians were not on good terms at the time. The Egyptians attempted a number of unsuccessful invasions of the Bogos/Hamasien provinces in present-day Eritrea, which were repelled by Emperor Tewodros II. Around that time, the Oromo people under Muhammad ibn 'Ali 'Abd ash-Shakur were prospering in Harar. The Emir of Harar persecuted his own people, favoring the Oromo tribes over the Harari people due to the Emir siding with the Oromo clans to become Emir of Harar. He gave Oromo traders privileges at the expense of Harari traders, disenfranchising local Hararis and causing dislike for this autocratic rule. The Harari opposition therefore reached out to the Egyptians, who had annexed Zeila and Berbera.

== Invasion of Somali territory ==
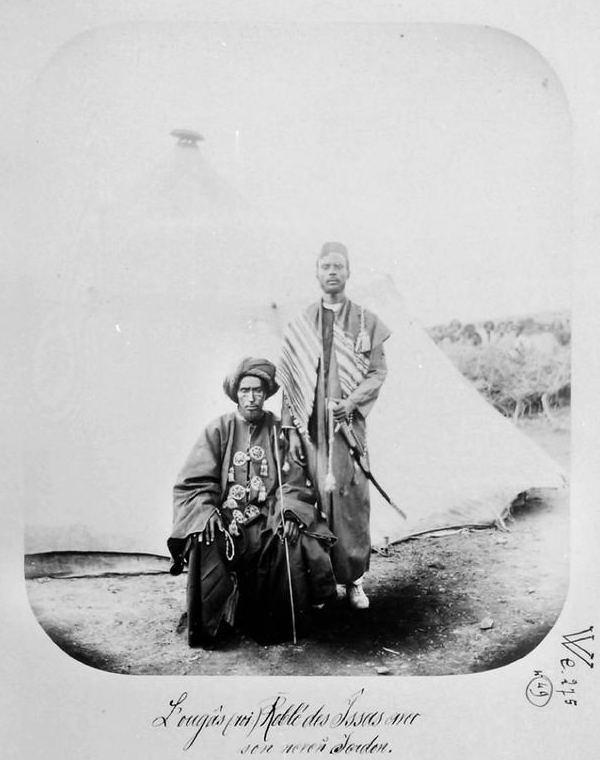
Issa Ugaas Rooble with his nephew, Jardon, in 1885

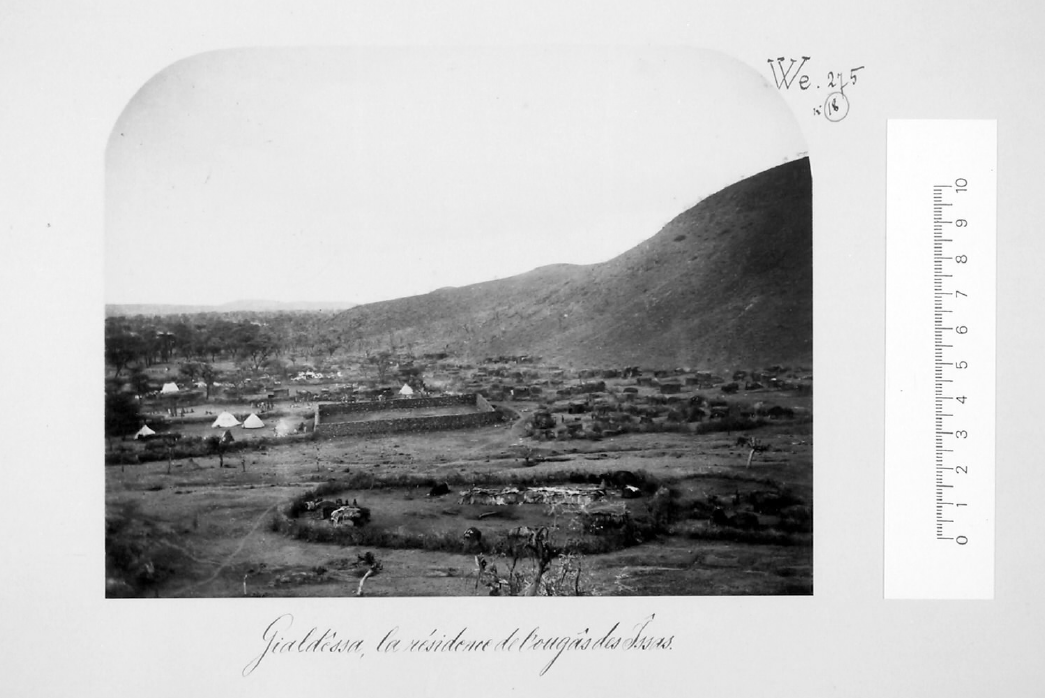
Jaldessa in 1885

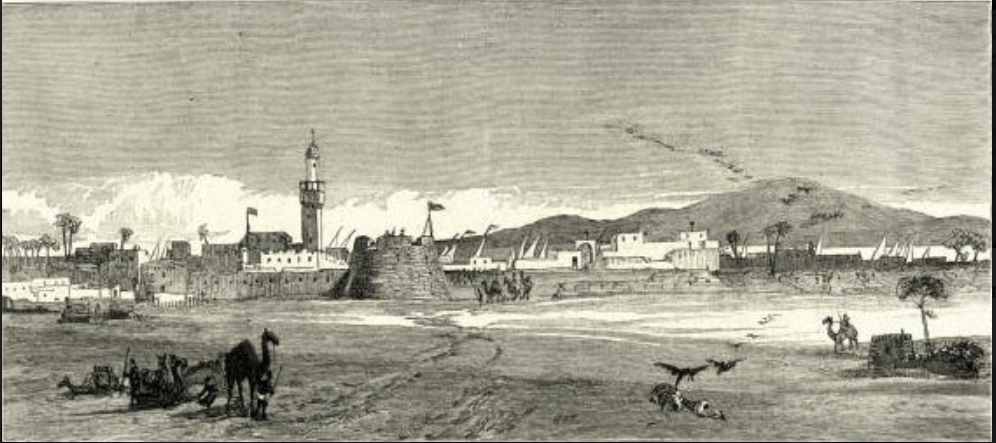
Illustration of Berbera under Egyptian rule c. 1884

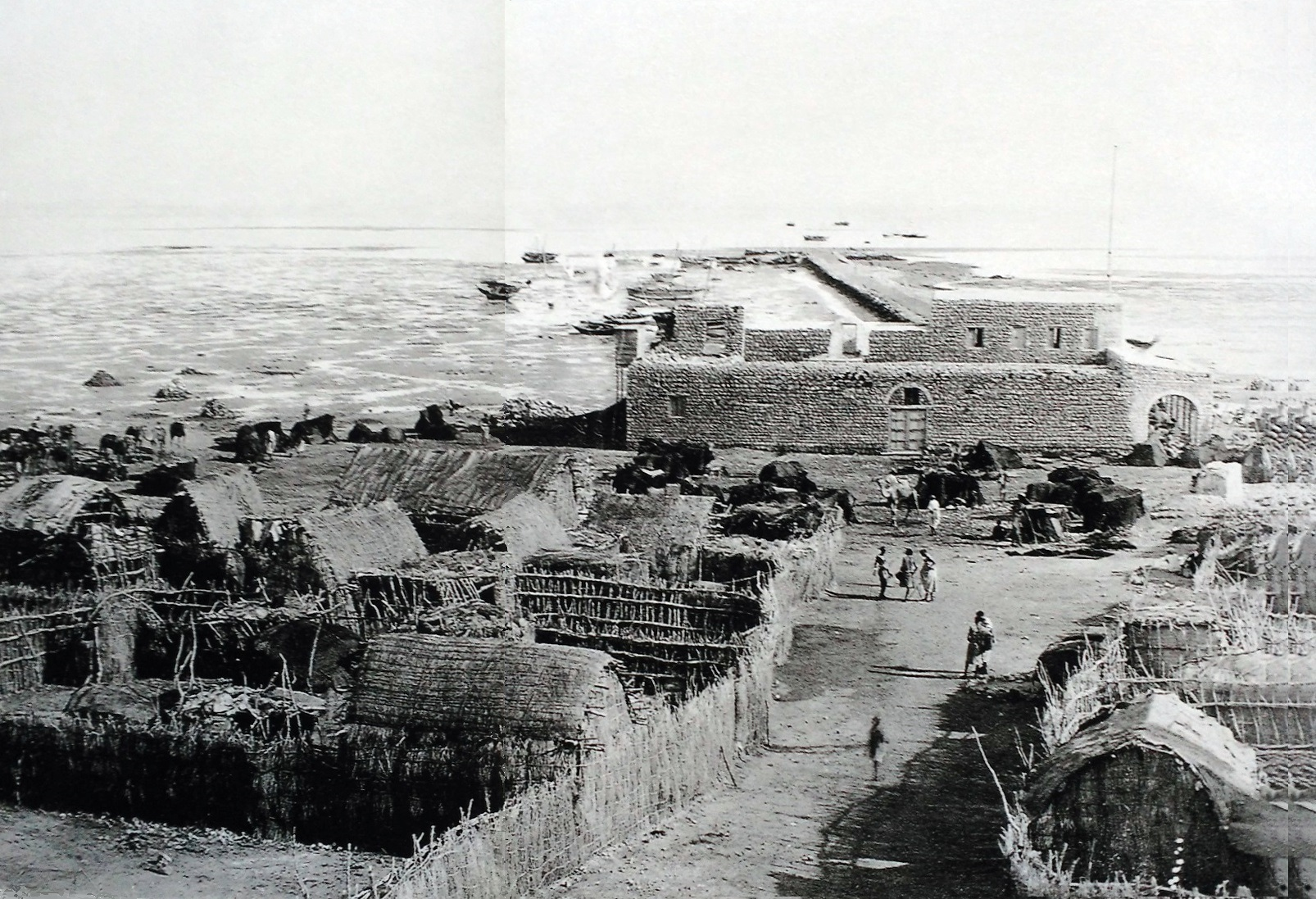
Zeila waterfront under Egyptian rule, 1880

By 1873, the Egyptians Bought Zeila and Berbera (which was temporarily closed). The Egyptians entered Jaldessa in 1875, and left a small garrison at what would be the seat of Ugaas Robleh Farah.

The Egyptians signed an 1877 treaty with the Gadabuursi.

The Jaarso and the Gurgura clans made peace with the Egyptians for one year to avoid Fitna

Major Hunter, an English Egyptian officer, was sent to Harar in mid-1884 and conducted a number of surveys. According to Hunter, the Issa clan (who numbered about 60,000) lived near the trade routes of Zeila and Harar and were the most dangerous Somali clan; the Jaarso who lived between Harar and Jigjiga were very unpredictable and any forced contact with them were risky and the Habr Awal, who lived between Harar and Berbera, were friendly.

Eliakim Littel (1894) describes the remains of an Egyptian fortress built near Harar to protect the trade routes linking Harar to Zeila from the Gadabuursi:

On the east bank of the Dega-hardani are the remains of a fortress built by the Egyptians during their occupation of this country, of which I shall have more to say. The object of this wayside fort was to protect their trade from the plundering Gadabursi tribe, whose country at this place approaches the road.

=== Battle of Aussa ===
Before 1875, the Afar and Ottomans had very little contact with each other (although they had been neighbours). Around 1578, the Ottomans invaded Massawa and other cities on the Red Sea coast.

The battle of Aussa (1875) was fought between the forces of Werner Munzinger and the sultan of Aussa. Munzinger was defeated at Gondet by the Ethiopian Emperor Yohannes IV, and was instructed to lead his forces elsewhere. He arrived in Aussa in 1875, and defeated the Afar garrison for an Egyptian victory.

== Battle of Tadjoura ==
According to survivors, Munzinger, his wife and child arrived in Tadjoura on 5 October to open the roads between Ankober and Tadjoura for contact with King Menelik of Showa; he was also instructed to annex the Afar Sultanate of Aussa and penetrate areas such as Wollo Province. Munzinger's forces consisted of 350 soldiers, two guns, and 45 camels. Reaching Aussa on 14 November, the Egyptian forces were attacked at night by a large number of Issa. The Afar and Issa forces under Sultan Muhammed Hanfadhe destroyed the Egyptian army, leaving only a small number who fled to Massawa. Amongst those killed were Munzinger and his family.

Soon after the destruction of the Egyptian expedition, Arabs from Mocha (then ruled by the Ottomans) attempted an invasion of Zeila and Aussa. The ulama of Aussa, however, repulsed the Ottoman Yemenis out of their territory. Isma'il Pasha replaced Munzinger with Muhammad Rauf Pasha. Rauf was instructed to lead a large force of Egyptian and Turkish soldiers into southeastern Ethiopia, beginning his conquest of eastern Ethiopia.

== Conflicts with Harar Oromo ==
According to Egyptian administrator Rauf Pasha the emir Muhammad of Harar had instigated Oromo resistance against Egyptian forces:

He said to them: "The Turks will take your children and make them into soldiers and send them to Zeila." I worked very hard among their families to put out the fire that the emir had lit.

The battle of Hakim was fought by the Egyptians and the Harar Oromo tribes. According to the Oromo, their elite were told to approach Mount Hakim to make peace with the Egyptians. However, this was a trap to kill the elite to intimidate the other Oromo in the area. According to the Oromo sources, no Oromo leader in Hakim survived.

Rauf continued to march towards Harar. He received a mid-1875 letter in Arabic from the Garad of the Jaarso Adam Ashabbiye, who had participated in skirmishes between the Egyptians and Oromo. The garad praised Rauf in the letter, swearing allegiance and surrendering his kingdom; the garad and his people were Muslims, and did not want to fight the Egyptians. Rauf entered Jarso in early October 1875, and was welcomed by 62 Jaarso leaders who had agreed to surrender their territories to him.

=== Expeditions into Nole and Ala territory (1874–1875) ===
In 1874, the Egyptians led a large force from Zeila to Hararghe. The Nole and Ala, the most powerful groups in the region, led a series of campaigns against them. Before the Egyptian occupation, Jaldessa and the Harar-Berbera trade route were under Nole Oromo control. According to a report on Harar the Nole Oromo numbered about 142,000 and were centred in Jaldessa (the border between the Issa and Nole). The Nole had subjugated the Issa near Jaldessa, and were the dominant clan there. The Egyptians arrived in Jaldessa in 1875, and peacefully took control of the city around the time the Ughaz of the Issa Robleh Farah moved his seat to Jaldessa.

=== Battle of Gaflole ===
In September 1875, a large Afran Qallo force under Orfo Jilo Biko ambushed the Egyptian army west of Harar. In the battle the Egyptians captured Ali ibn Abu Bakr, uncle of the ruler of Harar. Ali ruled the territory of Igu, and was the cousin of the emirs of Harar and Zeila. When Rauf invited the Harari leaders to discuss the occupation, Ali Abu Bakr offered to betray his cousin.

=== Battle of Iftur ===
On September 24, Afran Qallo soldiers arrived at Mount Hakim and Iftur. Oromo leader Orfo Jilo Biko attacked both Egyptian flanks, but Rauf's firepower destroyed his cavalry and archers. Rauf sent his artillery to Mount Hakim, site of the battle of Hakim.

=== Battle of Eguu ===
The battle of Eguu was significant in Nole history. The Nole Oromo led their army into the outskirts of their territory at Eguu (thirty miles west of Harar), which the Egyptians planned to attack. Egyptian firearms beat back the Nole cavalry, since their horses were afraid of the noise. After seven hours, the Nole army was destroyed.

=== Battle of Abgou ===
The Battle of Abgou was fought on October 8, soon after the battle of Eguu. The Ala and Nole Oromo allied and led a large force of Oromo soldiers who blocked roads and defeated the Egyptians. The following day, 37,000 Ala and Nole cavalry and infantry awaited the Egyptians near Abgou. Rauf reported that the Egyptians opened heavy fire on the Oromo; after seven hours and 10 minutes, the Oromo sent their women to surrender. The Egyptians requested that the Nole and Ala send their leaders. The Ala sent Al Buku Raya, and the Nole sent Uthman Yaro and Ali Karow. The Nole representatives asked for mercy, but their request was ignored. In spring 1882, the Egyptians destroyed a Metta (Ala) and Oborra Oromo force at Chelenqo and subjugated the Oborra and Ala tribes.

=== Battle of Dire Gofile ===
The battle of Dire Gofile was the most important battle between the Oromo of Harar and the Egyptians. Rauf ordered the Egyptians to rush to Dire Gofile, deep in Nole territory (east of Harar), after the battle of Hakim in an attempt to intimidate the Nole Oromo; he also took advantage of Oromo leader Orfo Jilo Bikos' presence in the region. Bikos had left his main force, which was fighting the neighbouring Issa Somali, in the Ogaden desert. The small Oromo force eventually surrendered; its leaders, including Orfo Jilo Biko, Garad Jibril, Ali Abu Bakr, and Garad Adam Asihabiyye, were captured and sent to Cairo. After the battle, the Egyptians marched into Harar with little Oromo resistance. The four Nole tribes, the 12 Ala tribes, the three Berteri tribes, the two Babile tribes, the seven Abiba tribes, the three Hiri tribes, and the Abuba, Ittu and Zaho Jarelo Oromo tribes surrendered on October 11, 1875.

After conquering Harar, Rauf killed the emir and the Oromo leaders who did not surrender and declared himself emir of Hararghe. He subdued every Oromo tribe, suppressing all rebellions to end Egyptian rule.

After solidifying their control in the area, the Egyptians proceeded to appoint Oromo administrators in the surrounding areas of Harar city, including Garads, Malaks, and Damins. There were also notable Harari revenue agents (dogin) such as Abdullahi Sadiq.

== Aftermath ==
=== British occupation (1880–1885) ===
After occupying the Khedivate of Egypt, the British controlled the Hararghe and Somaliland. They sent expeditions to the Barento, the only Oromo to resist the British occupation. Amir Abdullahi was the last emir of Harar, and with Oromo support pushed the Egyptians and British out of Harar to Mount Hakim.

Garad/Sultan Adam Asshabiye, the ruler of the Jarso, made peace with the Egyptians, however his son Aaqil (Muhumad) and successor continued resistance.

=== British and French involvement (1885) ===
During the mid-1880s, Mahdism took control of Sudan and much of Egypt; however, it was unsuccessful in Harar. Major Hunter recommended that the British governor of Harar return independence to the Somalis. Hunter's main concern was Berbera, as rumours spread about the Egyptian disaster in the Sudanese ports. Hunter said that Emir Abu Bakr of Zeila, an Afar businessman, influenced the Issa and Afar. Hunter warned the Egyptians that Abu Bakr was probably planning an invasion of Berbera. In March 1884, Hunter returned to Aden and established himself as the first British governor of Harar. He described the bey of Berbera as an incautious, suggestible and corrupt ruler, and described Emir Abu Bakr as a powerful man who controlled the slave trade along the Somali coast. The governance of Abd al-Rahman Bey, led to the enforcement of exploitative policies which inflamed local unrest. That year, the Capuchins arrived in Harar without telling the Egyptians; their mission was successful in Berbera, but failed in Zeila. The Egyptians were afraid that the French church would spark a religious war, and did not provide the church with security in or near Harar. In 1884 they had left Berbera, and the British agreed with the Habr Awal to remain in Berbera. Hunter returned from Aden in August 1884, and ordered Nuba Pasha to evacuate Zeila; this was impossible, however, due to Emir Abu Bakr's influence on the area's Somali tribes. Abu Bakr tried to earn Hunter's favour, and gave him economic resources; he requested Egyptian protection, and told Hunter that he would not continue as ruler of Zeila. On 27 October 1884, the Egyptians left Sagallo; Abu Bakr told the British that the next night, the French planted their flag in the area. Although it was Abu Bakr's duty to work with the British, he was also secretly working with the French in Djibouti. Abu Bakr succeeded Haji Ali Sharmarke Saleh, had gained the respect of the Issa and Afar, and controlled Tadjoura and Zeila from 1860 to 1884; he also controlled the lucrative Red Sea slave trade.

== Gallery ==
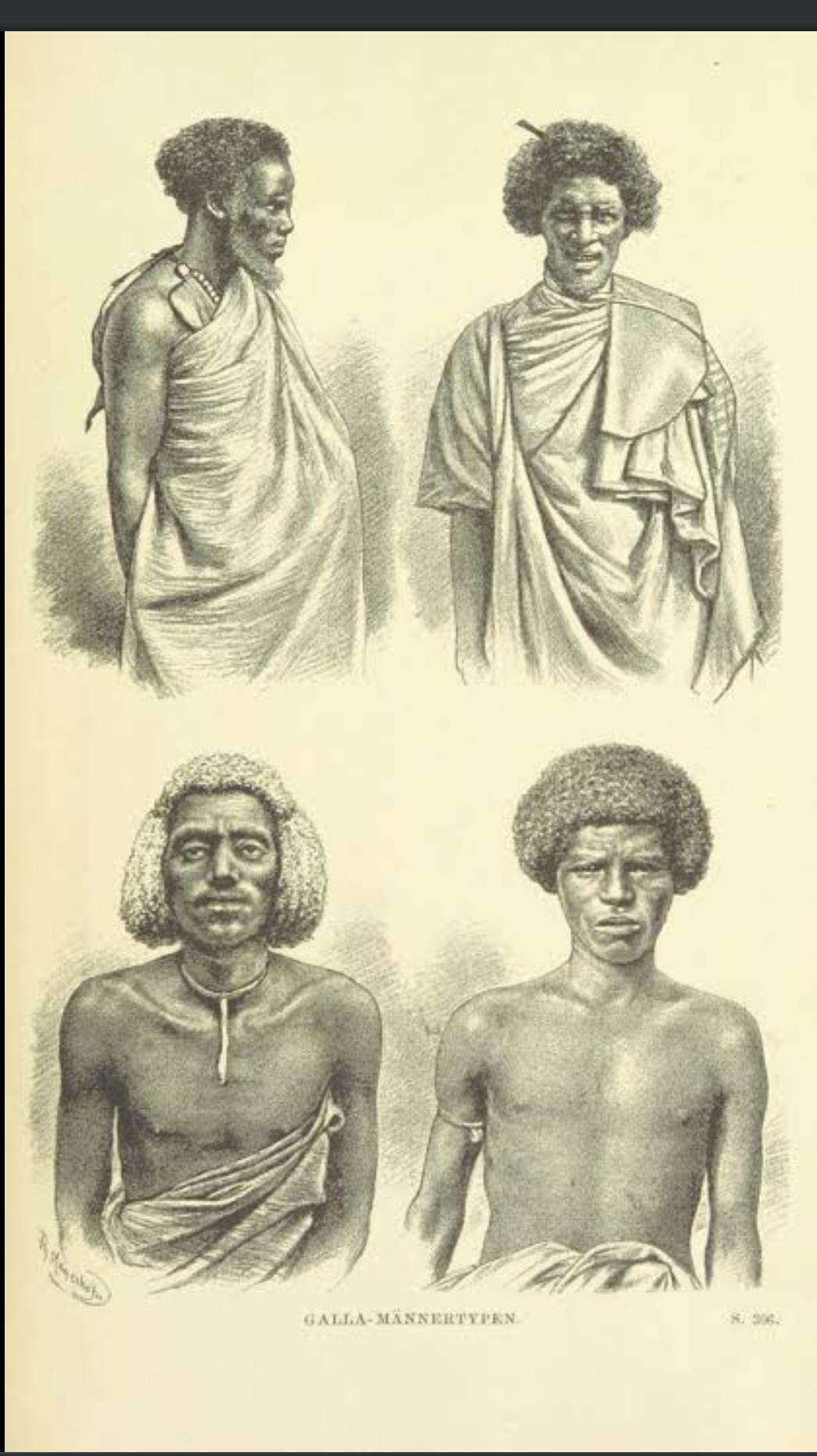
Oromo men in Harar during the Egyptian era

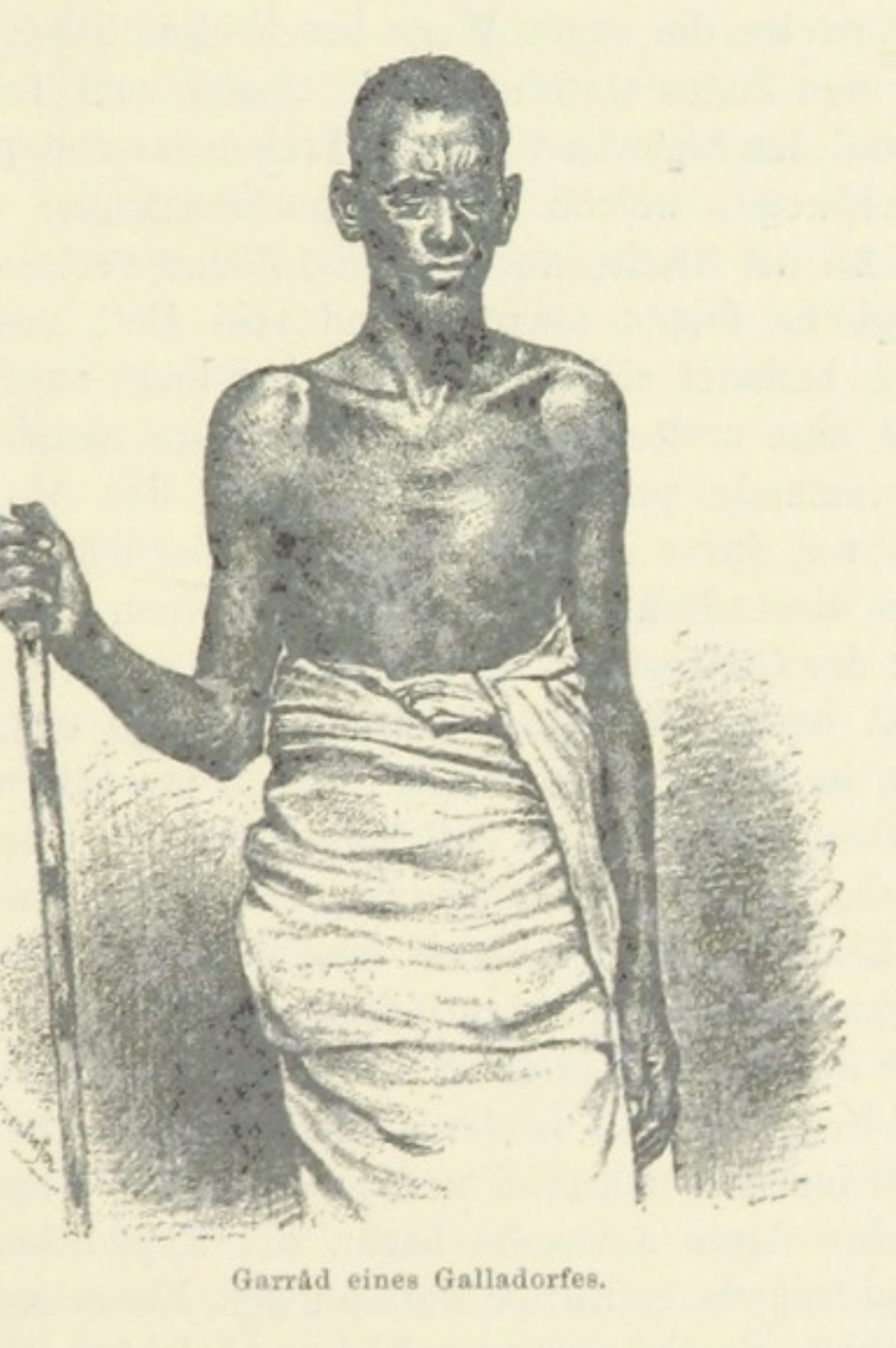
Oromo Garad Abu Bakr Liben of a village northwest of Harar (1885)

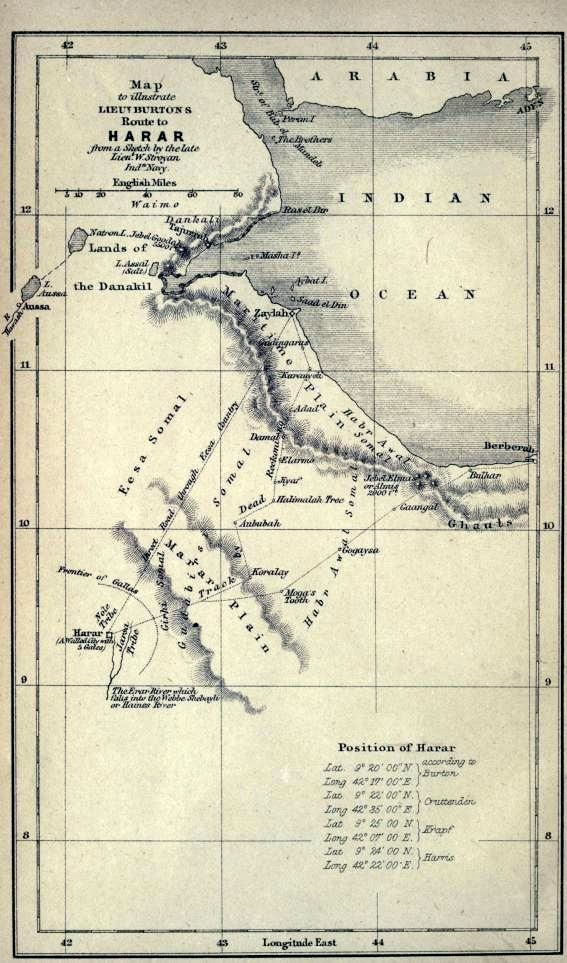
19th-century map by Richard Francis Burton with the Nole, Issa, Gadabuursi, Jarso, and Gheri Oromo-Somali tribes

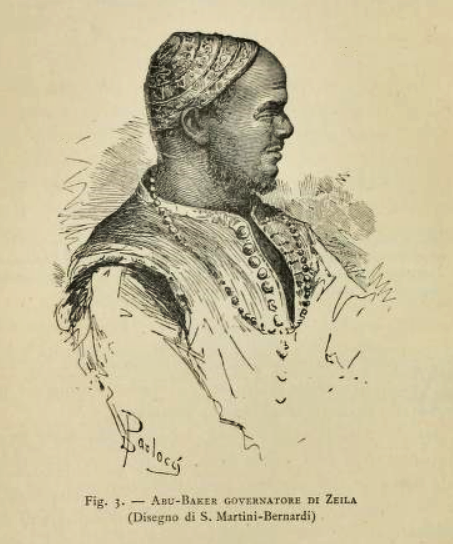
Abu Bakr in 1877

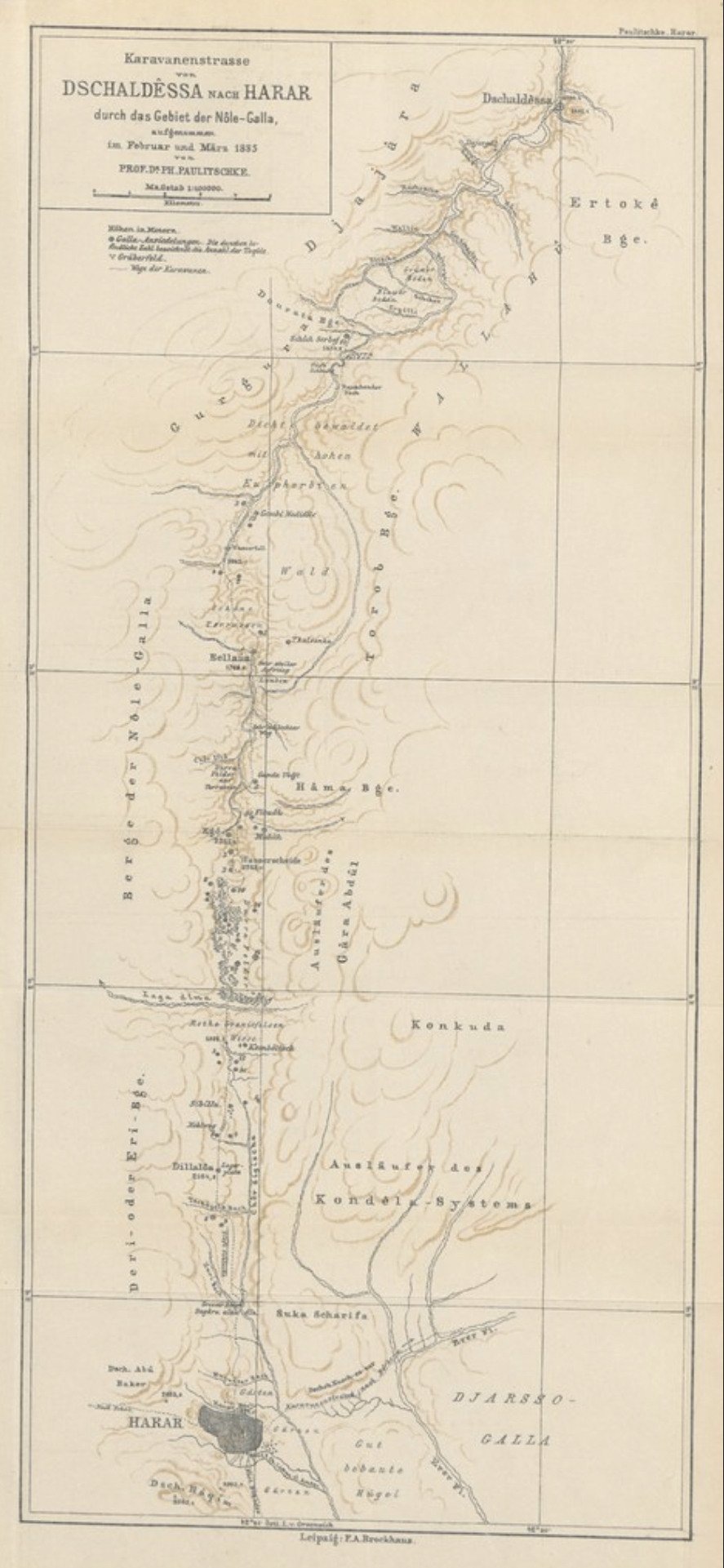
Map of the Hararghe, including territories of the Nole and Ala Oromo

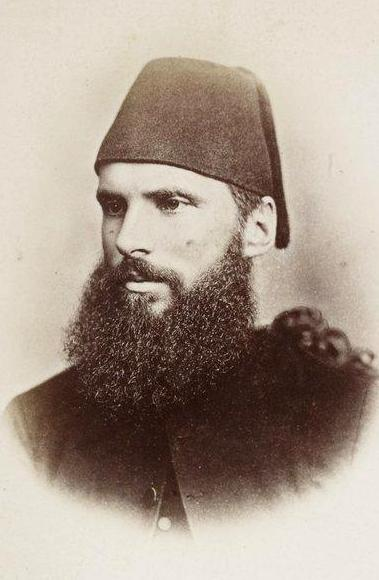
Werner Munzinger in 1873
