= Khedivate's Somali Coast =

Dominion of Egypt from 1874 to 1884

Khedivate's Somali Coast ساحل الصومال الخديوي (Arabic) Sāḥil aṣ-Ṣūmāl al-Khudaywī خِدِيوِي مِصِر سُومَال سَاحِلِ (Ottoman Turkish) Hidiv-i Mısır Somali Sahili
- 1874–1884
- Flag Coat of arms

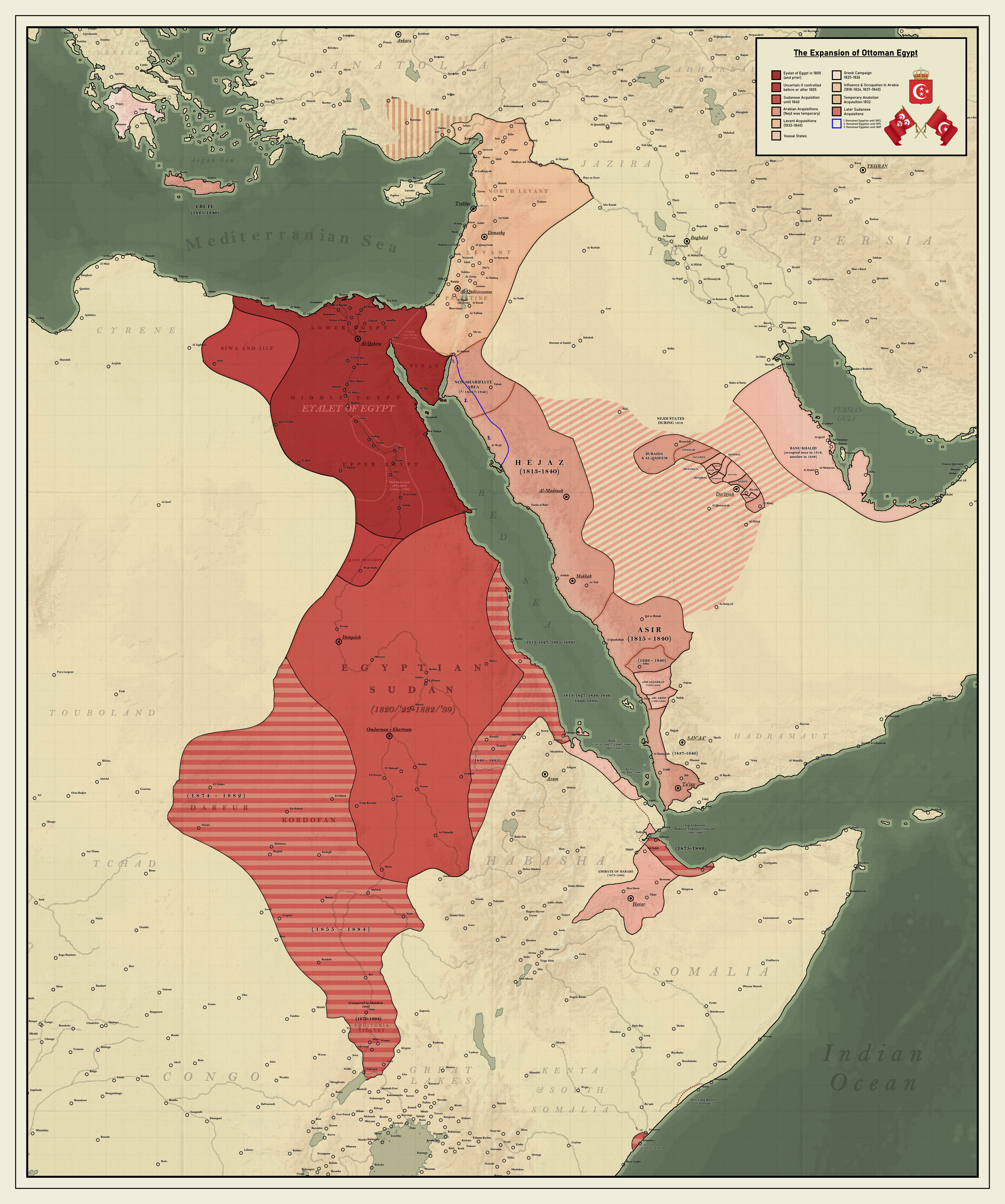
- Egypt and its expansion in the 19th century.
- Status: Province of the Khedivate of Egypt
- Capital: Berbera
- Common languages: Somali; Arabic; Ottoman Turkish
- History
  - Egyptian Invasion of Harar: 1874
  - Egyptian recall: 1884
Preceded by
Ottoman Zeila
Succeeded by
British Somaliland
Obock Territory
Dervish movement (Somali)
- Today part of: Djibouti; Somalia (de jure) ∟ Somaliland (de facto)

Khedivate's Somali Coast was a short-lived dominion of the Khedivate of Egypt over a few ports of the northern Somali coast. It came about when in 1874 Isma'il Pasha ordered the dispatch of two warships and three Khedival ships of the line towards the northern Somali coast.

== History ==
In 1870, the northern Somali coast's political landscape was transformed from a nominal dependency of the Ottoman Pashalik of Jeddah to an effectively occupied territory of Egypt after Ibrahim Pasha laid claim over the area in 1867. This dramatic shift was spearheaded by Egyptian officers, including Djamil Bey, Radhwan Pasha and Muhammad Rauf Pasha, who landed troops and asserted authority over local chiefs. Their actions, which involved a mix of military presence, persuasion, and financial incentives, created a "fait accompli" that forced a new reality on the region. The British, who had long enjoyed informal control, were initially alarmed. However, due to concerns about other European powers like France and Italy, they ultimately chose a diplomatic approach. Britain's Foreign Office agreed to recognise Egyptian sovereignty over the coast up to Cape Guardafui, on the key conditions that Egypt would ensure free ports, suppress the slave trade, and, crucially, not transfer the territory to any other power. This arrangement allowed Britain to secure its strategic interests in the area by using the Egyptian presence as a buffer against competing imperial ambitions.

The Ottoman Empire asserted control over a portion of the Somali coastline, from Zeila to Cape Guardafui, through the Khedivate of Egypt. This arrangement was formalised by an Imperial Decree on June 15, 1880. It followed a 1877 agreement with foreign powers that aimed to prevent the transfer of the region to other states and regulate trade. To symbolize their sovereignty, the Ottoman flag was raised at the port of Hafun. The administration was tasked with ensuring security and maintaining order, as well as enforcing a ban on the trade of black slaves. The Sublime Porte received an additional £15,000 in tribute for leasing Zeila and its nominal dominions, extending from near Tadjoura to Berbera, to Egypt.

In 1883 the Egyptians who were being pressured by the British decided to evacuate the Somali, and Oromo cities. During the Egyptian rule the Somalis controlled the Zeila-Harar trade route, and the Oromos shared the Berbera-Harar trade route. British officer Hunters carried a number of surveys in the Somali coast. He described the Habr Awal as a friendly people who lived between Harar, and Berbera, and that they supported the Egyptian capture of many towns. In 1884 the Egyptians, and Habr Awal burnt down a number of Bursuuk villages, in retaliation the Bursuuk attacked Habr Awal caravans on their way to Berbera. During the withdrawal period officer Hunters was more concerned on Berbera as rumour spread about the Mahdiyya of Sudan. He worried about Berbera more than Harar, because the Habr Awal Somalis had murdered the Governor of Berbera Abd- Al Rahman Bey. They did this because Abd Al Rahman had murdered a Somali in an attempt to rob a caravan. He also feared the Issa Somali would invade Berbera so he ordered a British warship be anchored at Berbera so the British could detect any Somali movement in the area.

Hunter also writes that the Emir of Zeila, Abubakr Pasha was possibly planning an invasion of Berbera. Hinter describes Abubakr as a Afar businessmen, and Emir who held great influence over the Afar, and Somalis. He also describes him as a slave master, and that he controlled slave trade in the Red Sea. Hunter describes the Egyptian Governor of Berbera as a man who was ready to take any command, but like all his friends was thuggish, and rude. In 1884 the British signed a deal with the Habr Awal which allowed British presence in Berbera for a while. Due to an internal rebellion in the Egyptian Khedivate's mainland territories, it was forced to abandon its Somali territories in 1884, and Britain began to take over these ports.

== Economy ==
They helped rebuild a dying economy, and established Berbera as the capital of the Khedive in east Africa. Although they did not control northern Somali littoral for long they did build lighthouses, piers, improved coastal ports and promoted Islam. The economic framework of the Somali coastal administration was also established through the agreement between the Ottoman Empire and Khedivate of Egypt. Although the British were permitted to conduct commercial activities, the Ottoman Empire set the import tax at 8% and the export tax at 5%. Despite these official tariffs, the documents indicate that the region did not generate significant tax revenue. The administration was considered a temporary measure, with the understanding that a more permanent, direct-to-the-center tax system could be implemented if the region's economy proved suitable in the future.

Controversies which existed during Egyptian administration included the payment of port duties by the Khedivate to the Ottomans, the inspection of the status of slave trade, and the demarcation of territory with the French Somali Coast as well as the Abyssinians towards the west.

== See also ==
- Zeila
- Berbera
- Habesh Eyalet
