= Sharmarke Ali Saleh =

Haji Sharmarke Ali Saleh الحاج شرماركي علي صالح
- Governor of Zeila; Emir of Berbera
- Reign: 1810s–1830s (Influential native trader based in Berbera), 1845–1852 (Berbera rule), 1841–1855 (Zeila rule), 1857–1861 (2nd term rule of Zeila)
- Predecessor: Sayyid Muhammad al-Barr
- Successor: Abubakr Pasha
- Born: c. 1775; Maydh, Isaaq Sultanate
- Died: May 25, 1861
- Religion: Sunni Islam

Sharmarke Ali Saleh (Somali: Sharma'arke Cali Saalax; c. 1775 – May 25, 1861) was a leading 19th century Somali ruler, captain, and merchant. He was given the nickname "Arab Rothschild" due to his immense wealth. He was one of the richest men living on the African continent at that time and also the 'political boss of the Somali coast', a title which is a testament to his political influence in the region. He served as the governor of Zeila between 1841-1861 and ruled Berbera between 1845-1852.

For a time was known as the richest man along the Somali coast. His descendants would go on to become the traditional leaders of the Musa Arreh sub-clan of the Habr Yunis clan.

== Early life ==
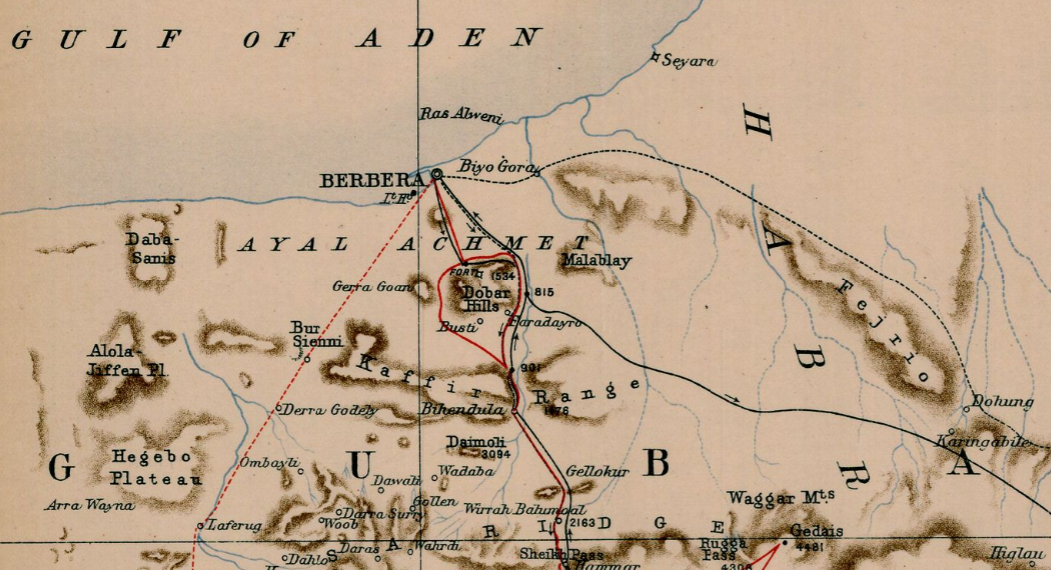
Map showing trade routes leading to Berbera and its environs

Little is known about Sharmarke's early life, except that he was born in the coastal town of Maydh in 1775 and he belonged to the Habr Yunis sub-clan of the Garhajis clan in the wider Isaaq. Clan

Haji Sharmarke received the famed explorer Richard Francis Burton in 1855 and Burton stayed in his home as a guest in Zeila.

Burton described Sharmarke as such:

The Hajj Sharmarke in his youth was a man of valour; he could not read or write. Nonetheless he carried in battle four spears, and his sword-cut was recognisable. He is now a man about sixty years old, reaching at least six feet two inches in stature, large-limbed, and raw-boned; his leanness is hidden by long wide robes. He shaves his head and upper lip Shafei-fashion, and his beard is represented by a ragged tuft of red-stained hair on each side of his chin. A visit to Aden and a doctor cost him one eye, and the other is now white with age. His dress is that of an Arab, and he always carries with him a broad-bladed, silver-hilted sword. Despite his years, he is a strong, active, and energetic man, ever looking to the "main chance." With one foot in the grave, he meditates nothing but the conquest of Harar and Berbera, which, making him master of the seaboard, would soon extend his power as in days of old even to Abyssinia. To hear his projects, you would fancy them the offspring of a brain in the prime of youth: in order to carry them out he would even assist in suppressing the profitable slave-trade.

== Battle of berbera 1827 ==
Sharmarke started out as a Nakhuda (captain) of a Somali vessel and trader. According to Frederick Forbes, a contemporary figure who retells the story of an attack of a trading brig in the Gulf of Aden, in 1825 the renowned British brig 'Mary Anne', on its way from Mauritius had been attacked and plundered in Berbera, resulting in several British crewman being killed. Sharmarke rescued and protected the remaining survivors, more so out of policy and pragmatism. This incident aided his burgeoning relations with the British government and eventually lead to a commercial treaty with the British East India Company some twenty years later.

== Rule ==
=== Rise and later rule in Berbera ===
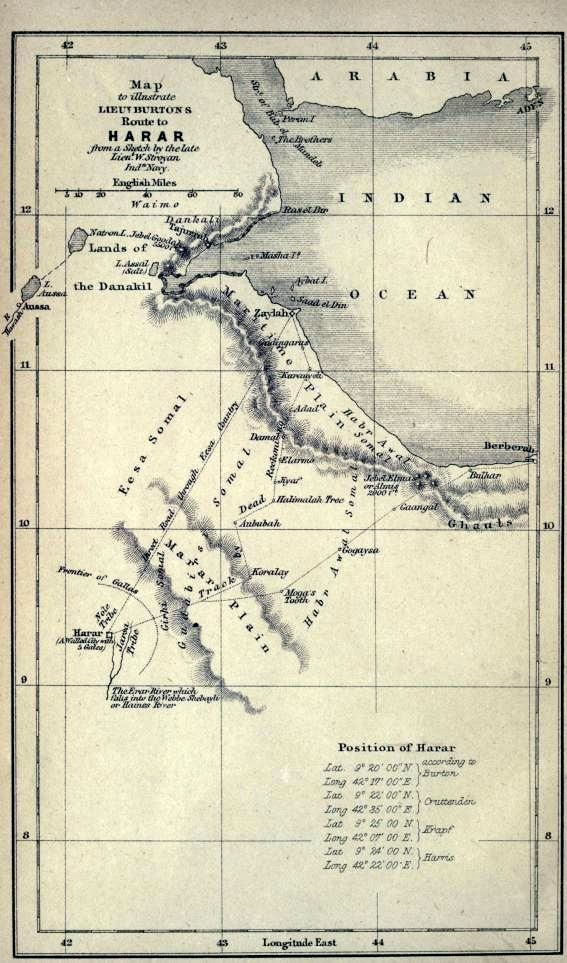
Richard Burton's map of the region, which shows the major ports of Zeila, Berbera and Tadjoura

Sharmarke rose to prominence as a dominant native trader during the Berbera fair held between October and April, which Mordechai Abir describes as "among the most important commercial events of the east coast of Africa." The major Somali sub-clans of the Isaaq in Somaliland, caravans from Harar and the wider interior, and Banyan merchants from Porbandar, Mangalore and Mumbai gathered to trade. All of this was kept astray from European merchants.

Sharmarke was also known for his trustworthy conduct when it came to matters of trade and general commerce, and was also known as the 'African Rothschild' by his contemporaries:

By his (sharmarke) industry and enterprise he has become the richest man along this coast; nor is there scarcely a prince or petty chief in the adjoining countries who is not indebted to this African Rothschild.

Historically, the port of Berbera was controlled indigenously between the mercantile Reer Ahmed Nur and Reer Yunis Nuh sub-clans of the Sa'ad Musa, Habr Awal. These two sub-clans effectively administered the trade of the town, especially in the dealings of all transactions and brokerage between various parties to issuing protection agreements towards the foreign Arab and Indian traders. In the year 1845, the two sub-clans had a dissension over the control of the trade of Berbera, which lead to a wider altercation where each side sought outside support. With the backing of Haji Sharmarke Ali Saleh, the Reer Ahmed Nuh drove out their kinsmen and declared themselves the sole commercial masters of Berbera. The defeated Reer Yunis Nuh moved westwards and established the port of Bulhar which later, for a brief period, became a trading rival to nearby Berbera.

Jealousies soon arose, and the Aial Yunus shortly after drove the Aial Ahmed out of Berbera, and declared themselves the only “Abbans” for strangers during the fair. The Aial Ahmed upon this took advantage of Berbera being deserted as usual, and, with the assistance of Hadj Shermarkhi Ali Saleh, governor of Zeyla, erected four martello towers on the spot generally occupied by the town, and hired thirty match-lockmen to garrison them. A battle of course ensued, and, assisted by the foreign allies, the Aial Ahmed drove the Aial Yunus away from the place.

Sultan Hassan brought both subclans before a holy relic from the tomb of Aw Barkhadle. An item that is said to have belonged to Bilal Ibn Rabah.

When any grave question arises affecting the interests of the Isaakh tribe in general. On a paper yet carefully preserved in the tomb, and bearing the sign-manual of Belat [Bilal], the slave of one [of] the early khaleefehs, fresh oaths of lasting friendship and lasting alliances are made...In the season of 1846 this relic was brought to Berbera in charge of the Haber Gerhajis, and on it the rival tribes of Aial Ahmed and Aial Yunus swore to bury all animosity and live as brethren.

Despite this resolution, control of Berbera later passed to the ambitious Isaaq merchant and politician Sharmarke Ali Saleh, who would eventually become governor and emir of Zeila and berbera on behalf of Sultan Hassan Sultan Farah.

=== Governorship and rule of Zeila ===
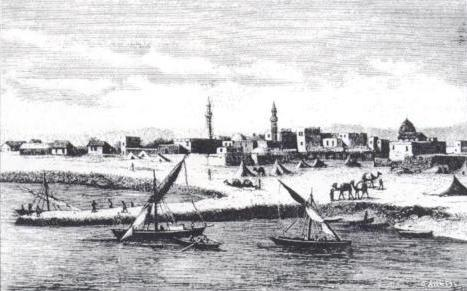
19th-century view of Zeila

As a tributary of Mocha, which in turn was part of the Ottoman possessions in Western Arabia, the port of Zeila had seen several men placed as governors over the years. The Ottomans based in Yemen held nominal authority of Zeila when Haji Sharmarke Ali Saleh, who was a successful and ambitious Somali merchant, purchased the rights to farm the town from the Ottoman governor of Mocha and Hodeida. According to Raphael Chijioke and James L. Newman, Sharmake served as a commissioner in the Ottomans’ employ, while Somali historian Mohamed Diriye Abdullahi adds that his connection to the empire was only nominal, through Mukha's representative.

However, the previous governor was not eager to relinquish his control of Zeila. Hence in 1841, Sharmarke chartered two dhows along with fifty Somali matchlock men and two cannons to target Zeila and depose its Arab governor, Sayyid Mohammed el-Barr. Sharmarke initially directed his cannons at the city walls which frightened Al Barr's followers and caused them to abandon their posts and succeeded Al Barr as the ruler of Zeila. Sharmarke's governorship had an instant effect on the city, as he maneuvered to monopolize as much of the regional trade as possible, with his sights set as far as Harar and the wider interior.

The British explorer, Charles Johnston, had detailed this conflict during his travels to Abyssinia:

Allee Shurmalkee (Ali Sharmarke) has since my visit either seized or purchased this town, and hoisted independent colours upon its walls; but as I know little or nothing save the mere fact of its possession by that Soumaulee chief, and as this change occurred whilst I was in Abyssinia, I shall not say anything more upon the subject.

During Sharmarke Ali Saleh's governorship of Zeila, Sharmarke's pre-existing trading activities with Southern Arabia and India continued unabated. Out of the twenty local vessels docked in Zeila ten were owned by Sharmarke himself, with two of the ships being "large trading dhows which convey yearly, about 300 tons of coffee and other goods" to Bombay.

=== Downfall and Resurgence ===
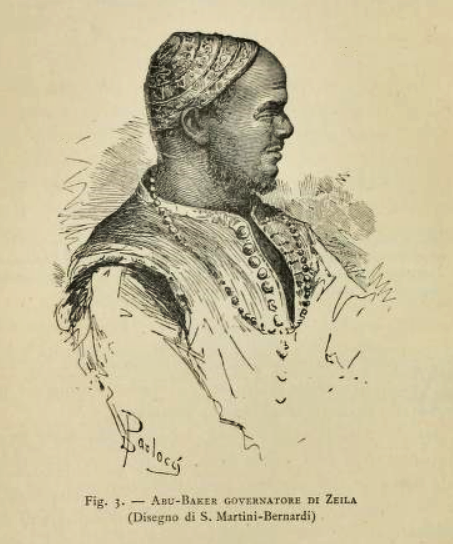
Afar merchant Abu Bakr, rival of Sharmarke for control of Zeila

In the year 1855, Sharmarke was deposed by his Danakil rival, Abu Bakr, who gained control of Zeila via the support of the French. However, Sharmarke was restored to power in 1857 and became the governor of Zeila again, ruling the historic port town until his death in 1861:

In April 1857, Coghlan reported that Boo Bekr (Abu Bakr), the ruler of Zeila, had been deposed by the Pasha of Hodeida, and Shermarkee restored to power. (BSC 1857, Coghlan-Bombay 4/24/1857)

Sharmarke Ali Saleh’s control over Berbera came to an end around 1852 following growing opposition from local Habr Awal factions, particularly the Reer Yunis Nur, who resisted his authority over the port. His rule was further undermined by interference from Abu Bakr II ibn `Abd al-Munan the amir of Harar, who reportedly supported local rivals to weaken Sharmarke’s influence. After losing Berbera, his constructions and fortifications in the city were destroyed by his opponents as a symbolic rejection of his rule. Although he retained control of Zeila until 1855 and briefly regained it between 1857 and 1861, he was never able to restore his authority over Berbera and adjacent regions again, marking the end of his regional dominance.

According to researcher Said M Shidad, it was Sharmarke's dream to restore authority to the lost state of Adal Sultanate

== Influence in Shewa, Harar and the Danakil Coast ==
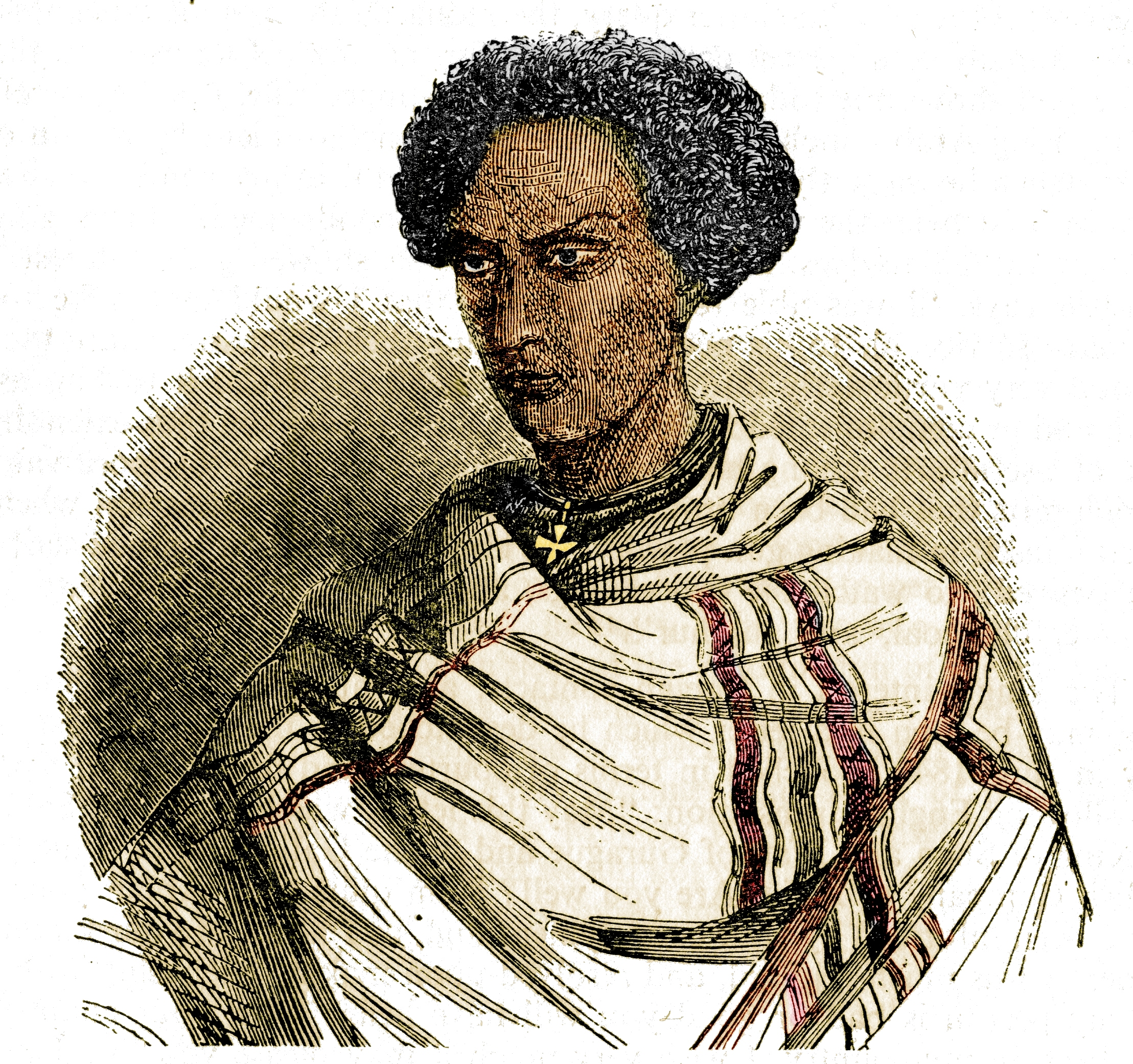
Negus Sahle Selassie with whom Sharmarke had great influence and convinced his son to arrest 300 Harari citizens

Sharmarke's influence was not only limited to the Somali coast as he had many allies in the interior of the Somali country and even further in Abyssinia, since he ruled the ports they depended on. Among his allies were the rulers of Shewa. When there was tension between the Amir of Harar Abu Bakr II ibn `Abd al-Munan and Sharmarke, as a result of the Amir arresting one of his agents in Harar, Sharmarke persuaded the son of Sahle Selassie, ruler of Shewa, to imprison on his behalf about 300 citizens of Harar then resident in Shewa, for a length of two years.

During Sharmarkes reign his end goal was to restore the kingdom of Adal and uniting the somali coast with Harar :

"With one foot in the grave, he meditates nothing but the conquest of Harar and Berbera, which, making him master of the seaboard, would soon extend his power as in days of old even to Abyssinia. To hear his projects, you would fancy them the offspring of a brain in the prime of youth: in order to carry them out he would even assist in suppressing the profitable slave-trade."

— Richard Burton, First Footsteps in East Africa

The Amir of Harar, Abu Bakr II ibn `Abd al-Munan, reportedly exercised caution and suspicion toward foreign and regional powers, including the English, the Turks, and Sharmarke Ali Saleh, whom he regarded as a formidable threat. The Amir feared that Sharmarke’s expansionist ambitions over the ports and inland territories could destabilize Harar and challenge its sovereignty.

Sharmarke Ali Saleh was also known to have great influence in parts of the Danakil (Afar) coast:

But the arrival of Ali Shermárki shortly changed this desultory conversation to weightier matters. This worthy old man, sheikh of the Somauli tribe Aber Gerhájis, possessing great influence and consideration among the entire Danákil population of the coast, had been invited from Zeyla, his usual place of residence, to assist in the extensive preparations making for the journey of the embassy.

Sharmarke also collected a tribute of 1,200-1,600 thalers annually from the inhabitants of Tadjourah, equivalent to a massive sum in modern currency. French Geographer Arnaud-Michel d'Abbadie visited the coast of the Horn of Africa to penetrate through towards the highlands of Abyssinia. However, he was halted in Tadjoura by Sharmarke who sent him back to Yemen.

== Architectural Work ==
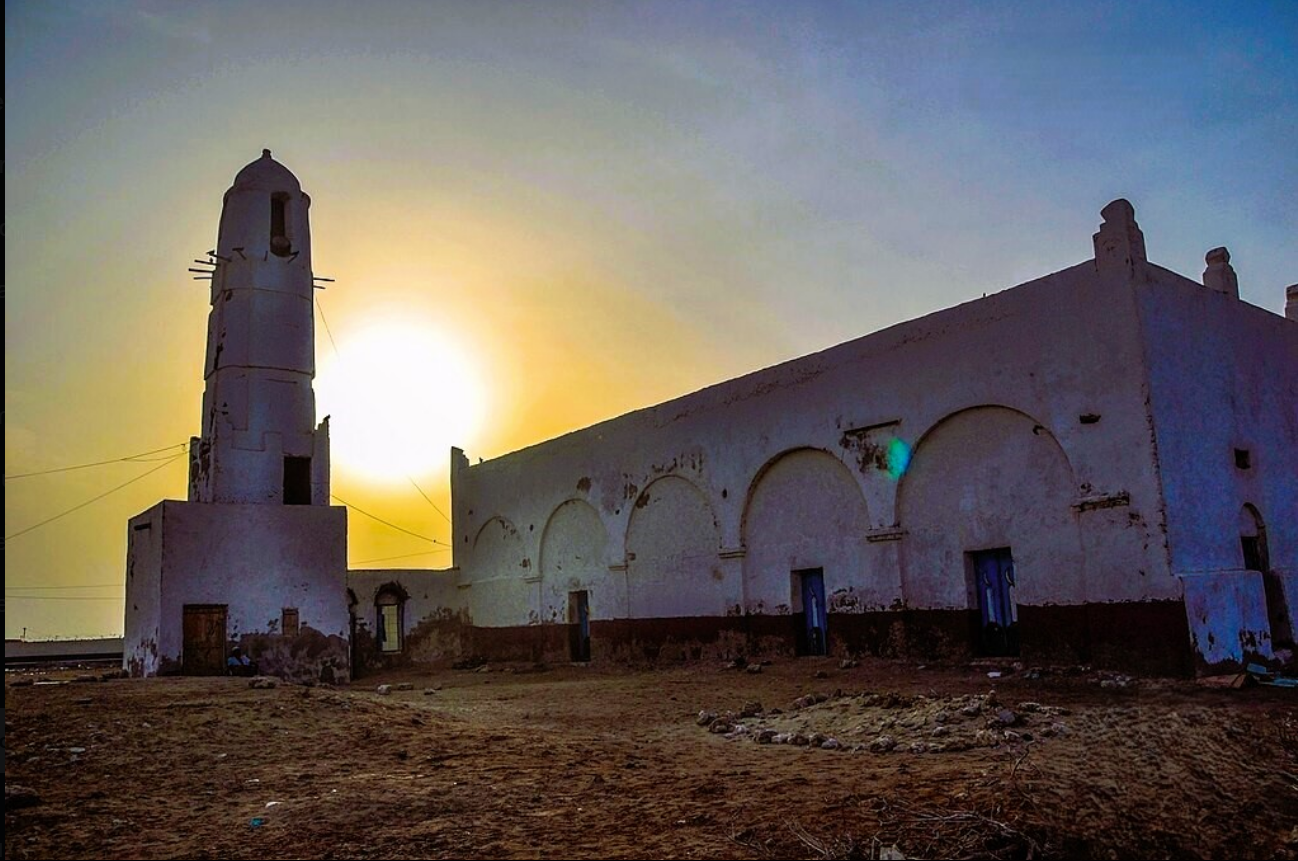
Medieval masjid build by Sharmake Ali Saleh

During his rule, Haji Sharmarke Ali Saleh initiated significant architectural enhancements in both Zeila and Berbera. Lieutenant Cruttenden, reporting in 1847, noted the markedly "improved appearance of Zeila" following Sharmarke’s personal investment in repairing the city’s stone fortifications and applying his own distinctive coloration to their surfaces, signaling his authority over the region. He was also credited with the construction of a new mosque in the city, reinforcing both civic pride and religious presence.

“Lieut. Cruttenden noted the improved appearance of Zeila in 1847 after Haji Sharmarke’s repairs of the stone city walls with his own colours signalling his rule also construction of a new mosques.”

These improvements served both practical and symbolic purposes, demonstrating Sharmarke’s leadership and the city’s growing prosperity. By restoring key urban features, he aimed to showcase the political and economic revival under his rule, supporting his efforts to expand influence toward Harar and the Ogaden.

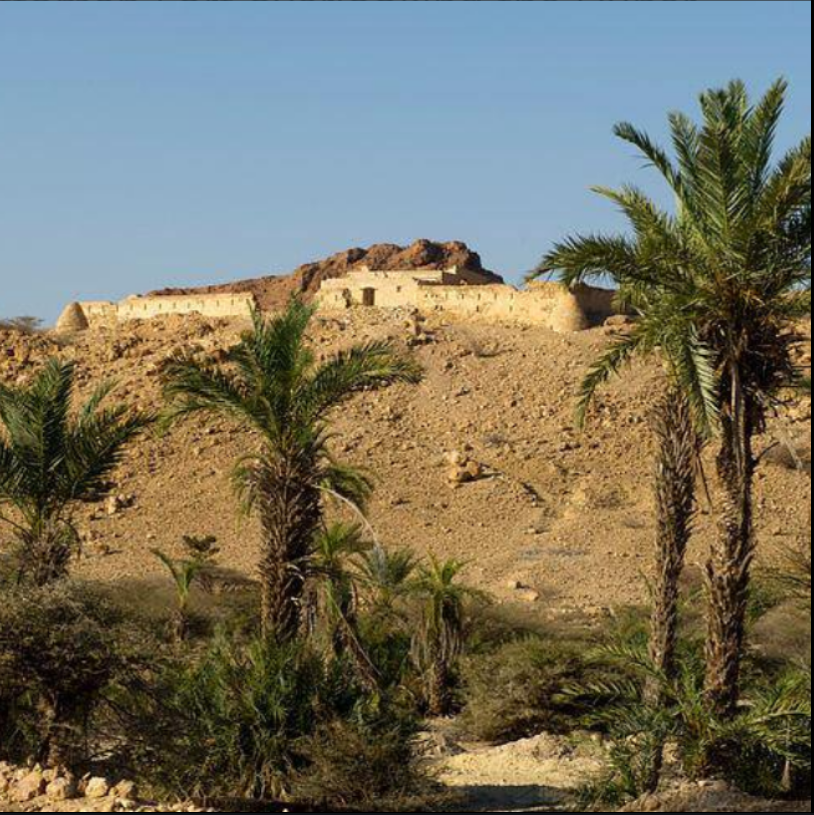
Defensive Forts Constructed by Sharmarke in the 1850s

In the mid-19th century, Haji Sharmarke Ali Saleh consolidated his control over Berbera by constructing Martello towers in 1845. Each tower was garrisoned with about thirty men and served to defend trade routes and assert authority over rival clans. The towers, reflecting both local and European fortification styles, are considered early examples of fortified architecture in Somaliland. Their construction highlights Sharmarke’s use of military and political strategies to maintain dominance in the region.

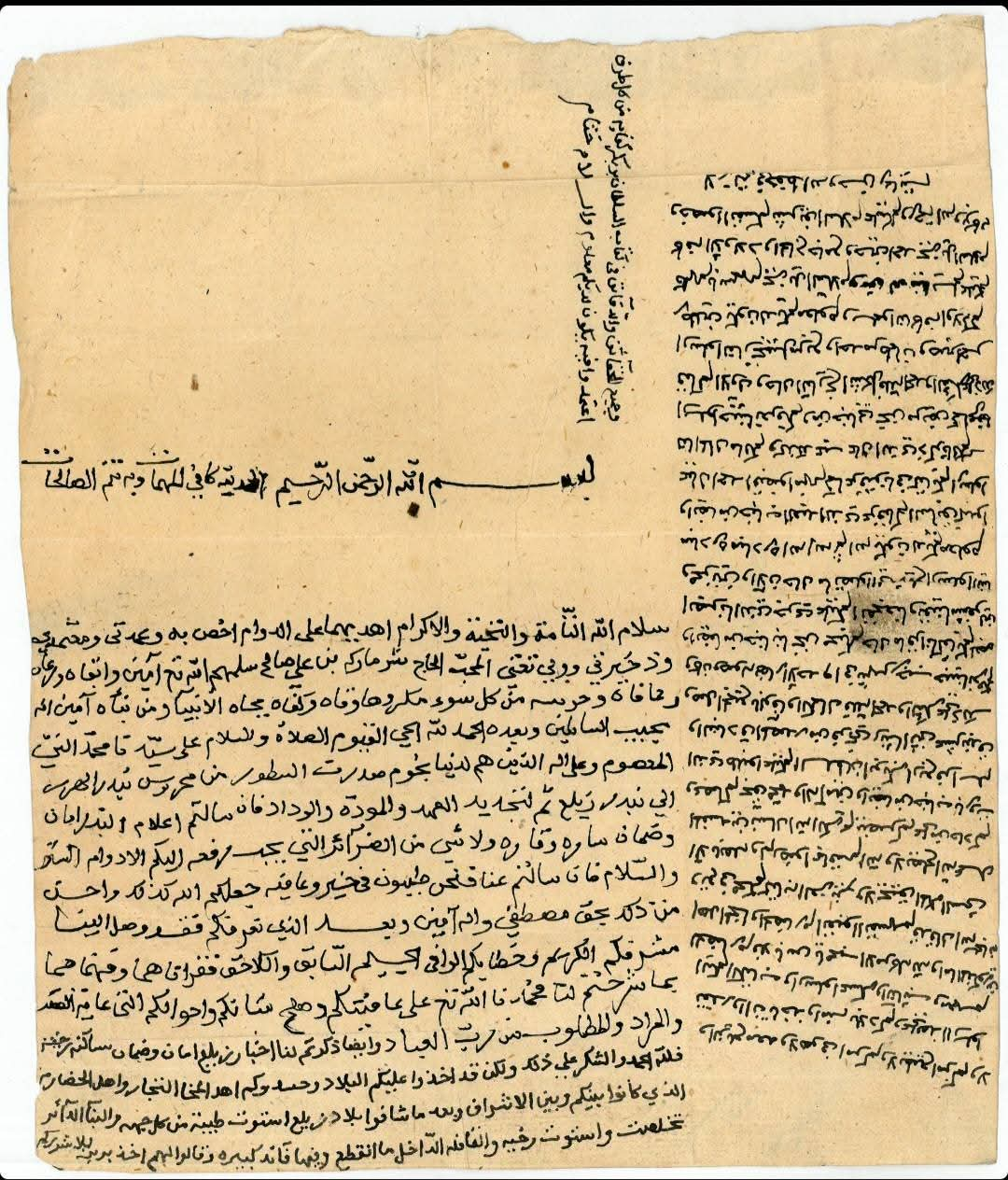
Letters sent by Muhammad ibn Al Marhum Al-Șūmāl to Emir Sharmarke Ibn Ali Saleh

Sharmarke Ali Saleh fortified Zeila and Berbera during his rule, implementing walls, stockades, and towers to secure the town. According to a British observer:

"Samaulle of Zeila named Sharmarke recently enclosed part of the town with a wall, reinforced another section with a strong stockade, and constructed three round towers at equal intervals to defend his newly established settlement."

== Death ==
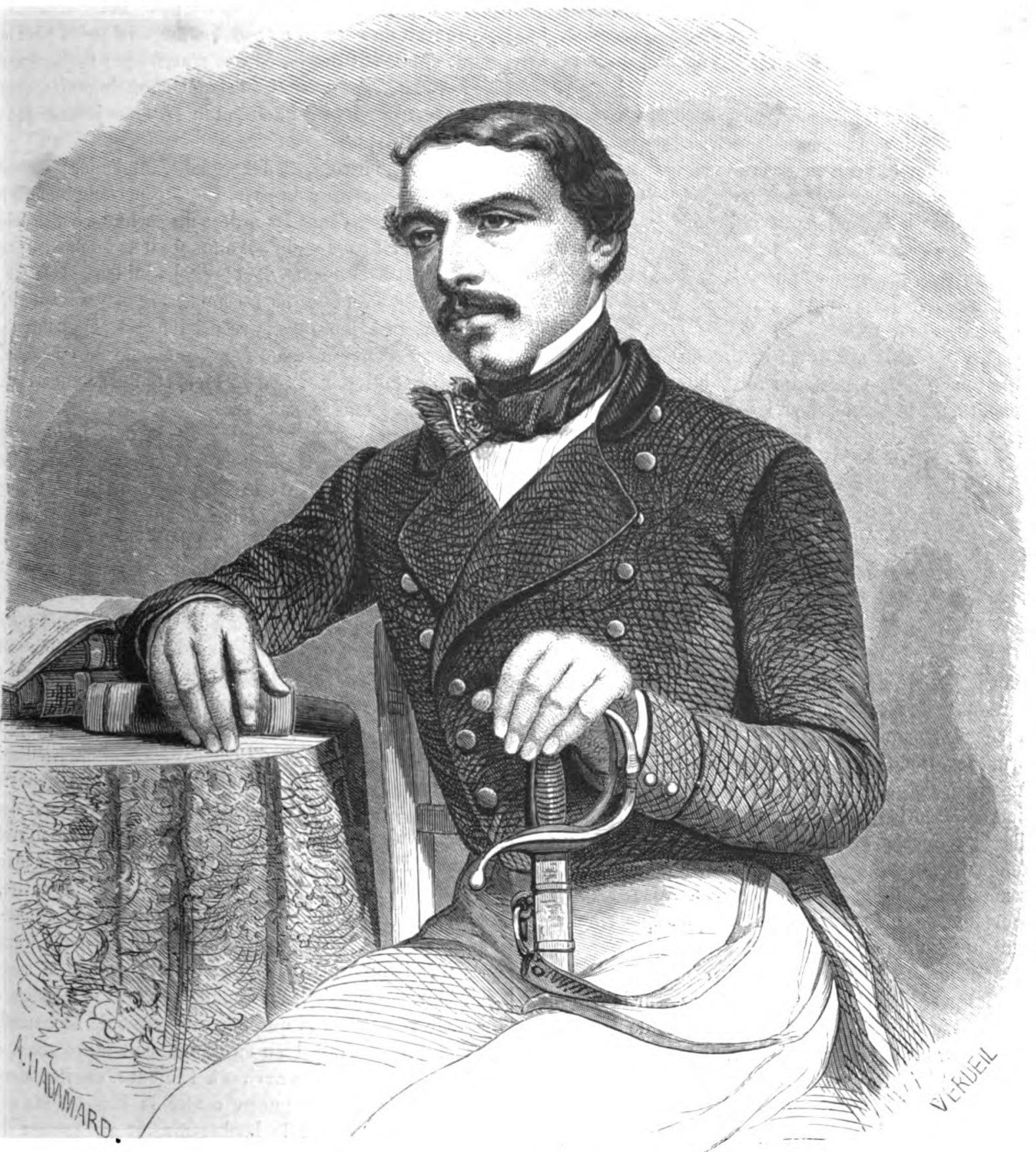
Engraving of Henri Lambert, published in Le Tour du Monde in 1862

In 1861, Sharmarke was believed by the French to have a role in the murder of Henri Lambert, a former French consular agent at Aden while on his way to Tadjoura, and who was incidentally a major supporter of Sharmarke's main rival Abu Bakr, an Afar/Danakil slave trader. Both the Turkish Pasha of Hodeida and the British Residency in Aden believed Sharmarke was wholly innocent of the charge, but the Haji and some of his supporters were arbitrarily arrested and handed to the French navy for a trial in Constantinople (although the trial was later moved to Jeddah). However, the ailing Sharmarke died during the journey and whether foul play was involved is not known.

== Lineage ==
Mohammed Sharmarke, the eldest son of Sharmarke Ali Saleh, provided his father's genealogy to Richard Burton, who recorded it as such

- Ishak Ibn Ahmed
  - Ismail (Garhajis)
    - Said (Habr Yunis)
      - Arrah
        - Musa
          - Ibrahim
            - Fikih
              - Adan
                - Mohamed
                  - Hamid
                    - Jibril
                      - Ali
                        - Awad
                          - Saleh
                            - Ali
                              - Sharmarke

== See also ==
- Aden Province – key trading partner of the northern Somali coast
- Ahmad III ibn Abu Bakr – Emir of Harar, who instigated Berbera natives to oust Sharmarke (Not to be confused with Abu Bakr, Sharmarke's Afar rival)
- Harar – trading hub and religious center of the Horn of Africa
- Sahle Selassie – Negus of Shewa whose court was well acquainted with Sharmarke
- Zeila and Berbera – Major Somali trading ports of the day
