= Abubakr Ibrahim Chehem =

Ottoman governor and merchant (c. 1810–1885)

Emir Abubakr Ibrahim Chehem Pasha
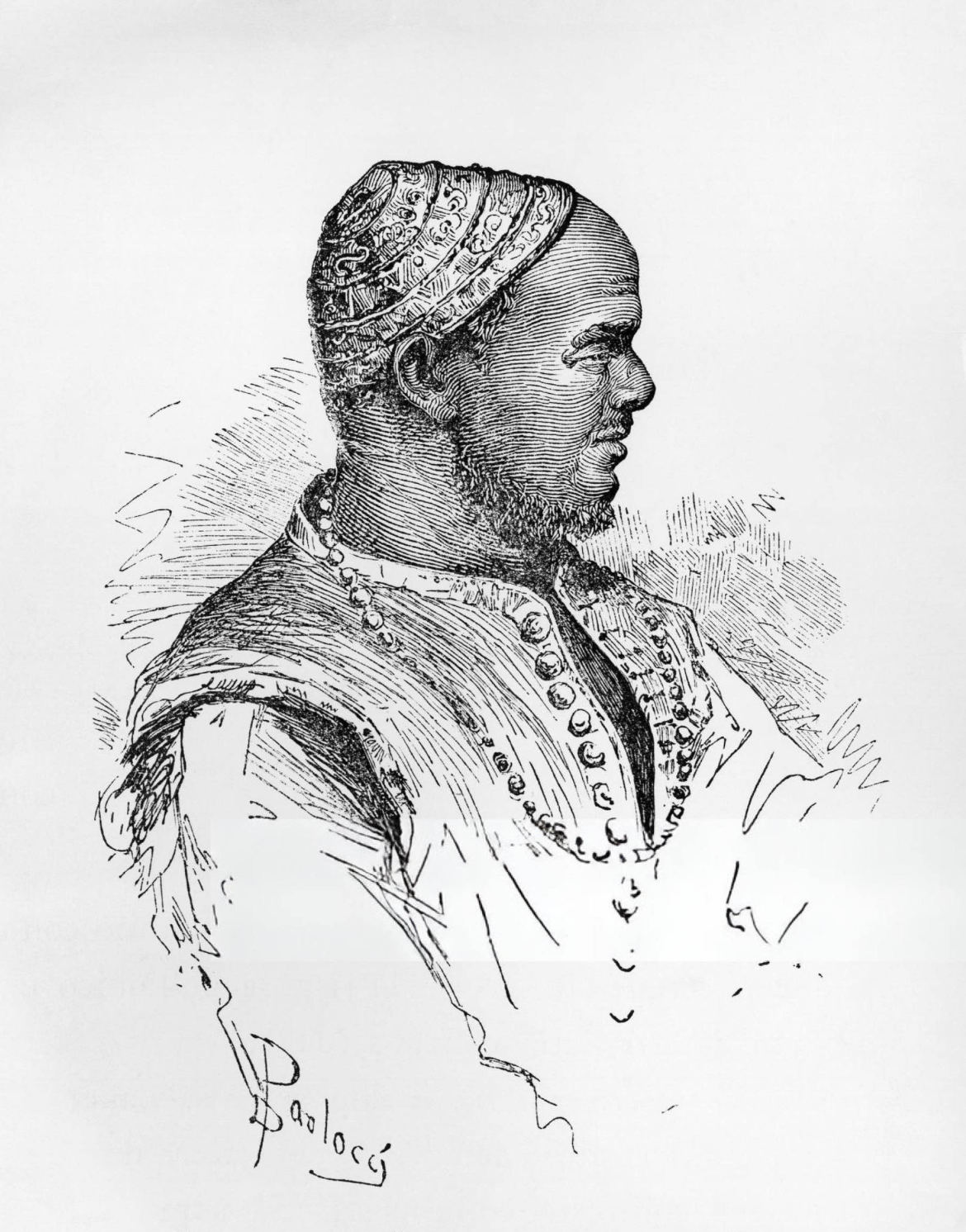
- Drawing of Abu Bakr Pasha, governor of Zeila in 1877 by the Società Geografica Italiana.
- Born: Abubakr Ibrahim Chehem c. 1810; Ambabbo, Sultanate of Tadjourah
- Died: 6 December 1885 (aged 75); Zeila, British Somaliland
- Citizenship: Ottoman; France
- Title: Dawlar of Zeila
- Predecessor: Sharmarke Ali Saleh
- Successor: Office Disestablished

Seal
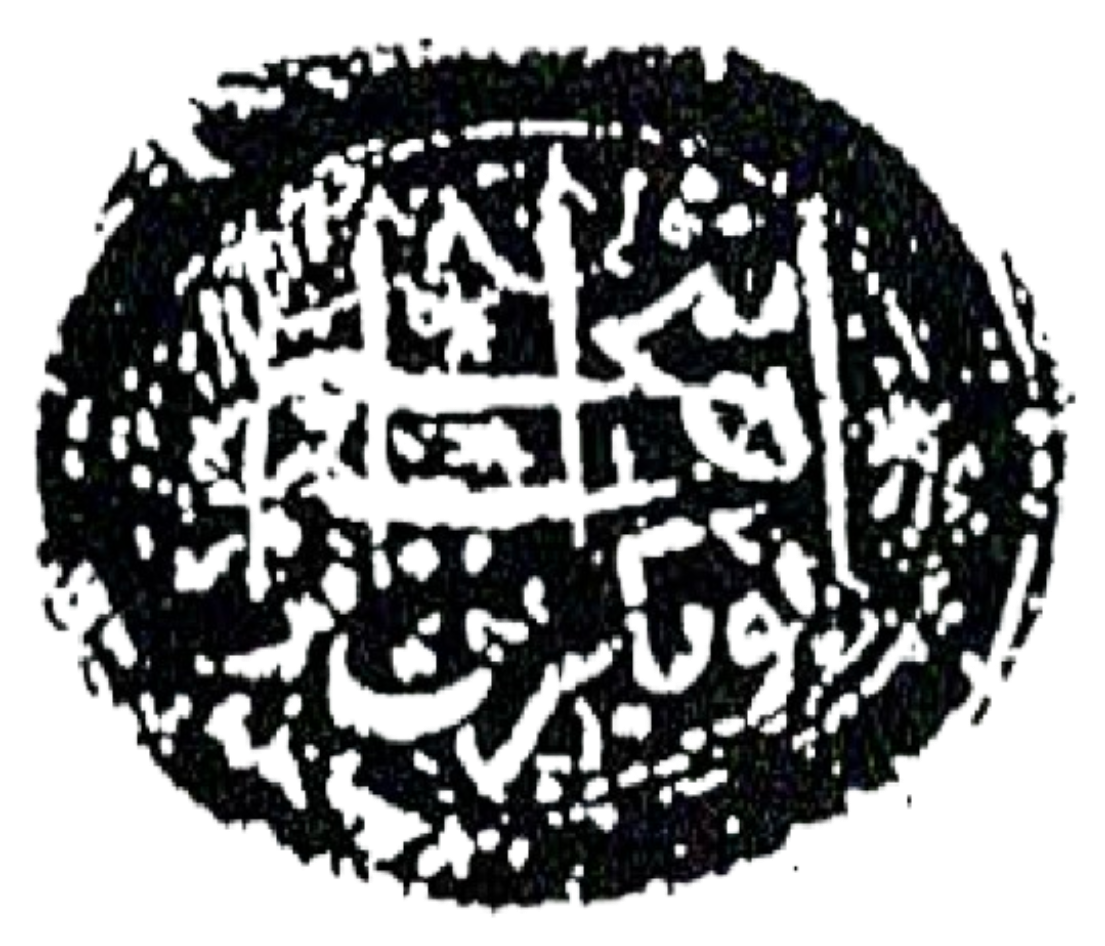

Emir Abubakr Ibrahim Chehem (Afar: Obakar Arbahim Sehim, Turkish: Ebûbekir Efendi Paşa; c. 1810 – 6 December 1885) was an Ottoman-Afar statesman, wealthy merchant, and slave-trader who served twice as the Pasha of Ottoman Zeila, first serving from 1855 to 1857 and again from 1861 to 1874, until the Egyptian invasion of Harar. During his first term, his rival Sharmake Ali Saleh accused him of embezzling funds from the customs office, leading to his arrest and an eight-month imprisonment. This incident resulted in his removal from office. He was eventually freed through the intervention of Henri Lambert, the French consul at Aden. After the Egyptian takeover in 1874, he continued to serve as the provincial governor of Zeila under the Khedivate’s administration until their withdrawal in 1884.

== Early life ==
Abubakr Ibrahim Chehem was born in Ambabbó, in the region of Tadjoura, to a family of Afar Hassoba origin. He was the third son of a wealthy Afar merchant named Ibrahim Chehem who primarily sold dates and incense which he acquired from the ports of Al-Shihr and Muscat. His mother, Handa, was an Afar from Tadjoura, originating from local sultan's Ada'il clan. French explorer, Charles-Xavier Rochet d'Héricourt met with Abubakr's brother Mohammed Chehem who had a wound in his arm which Rochet treated. According to Charles-Xavier, his father Ibrahim, founded the hamlet of Ambabbó because years prior, a feud erupted between Ibrahim's Hassoba clan and the people of Tadjoura, rooted in the Danakil tradition where spilled blood demands vengeance, sparking a cycle of retribution that can only be stopped through the death of the original culprit or a blood price settled in cloth, cattle, or money. However, no such agreement was reached, leading Ibrahim to leave Tadjoura.

His father had amicable relations with the Kingdom of Shewa and provided services for them, as a commercial agent but also as a diplomatic agent, leading caravans into the interior of Ethiopia from Ambabbó and Tadjourah. He acted as the intermediary between the Negus of Shewa, Haile Melekot and the British political resident at Aden, Stafford Haines.

In the 1850s, Ibrahim, an important economic operator, faced challenges from the rise of the Mudaito, who were extending their control over Awsa's fertile lands and demanding higher tolls. This period saw tense relations between Awsa and Tadjoura, continuing decades of conflict that had begun in the 1830s when the Mudaito seized control of the lower Awash valley. Clashes persisted, with a major defeat for Ibrahim's forces on June 25, 1852, at Gafu. This was where he and two of his sons, Mohammed and Maki were killed by the sultan of Aussa, Hanfadhe ibn Aydahis. Despite a brief victory later that year at 'Assal on June 25, 1852, Arbahinto's fortunes and those of the Hassoba of Ambabbó were severely shaken and by 1856, the Mudaito had secured control of the Awash delta. After Ibrahim's death, his son Abubakr Ibrahim emerged as a significant figure in the region.

== Rise to power ==
Following the deaths of his father and brothers in 1852, Abubakr took control of the family business with remarkable political skill, maintaining strategic trade relations between Shewa, Awsa, and Tadjoura. Menilek, Negus of Shewa since 1866, relied on this network to secure firearms and Western technologies, appointing his second son, Mahammad Pasha as governor of Aleyu Amba, a key trade hub. Mahammad helped expand the family's influence, controlling vital trade routes that connected Ethiopia's highlands to coastal markets. However, tensions arose in 1865 when the Amoyta of Awsa imposed a salt tax, triggering conflict with Tadjoura and its allies. This led to violent clashes, including the Awsa raid on Tadjoura in 1866, which was eventually resolved through mediation. Despite speculation about Arab or Turkish lineage, the Sheḥem family's dominance stemmed from their trade acumen, linguistic versatility, and extensive network across the Red Sea and inland Ethiopia. Their success in the commerce of slaves and firearms reinforced their regional power.

By then, Abubakr had already asserted his authority in Zeila and among inland peoples by negotiating safe caravan passage and maintaining trade flow through strong supplier-client relations. As his influence grew internationally, he needed not only rank and notoriety to be seen as a legitimate interlocutor but also the foresight to navigate foreign ambitions, whether benevolent or deceitful. In Zeila, where diverse communities coexisted under the distant rule of the Ottoman Empire, Abubakr, in his forties, sought to outmanoeuvre Somali merchant Sharmake Ali Salih in controlling customs revenues. His rise was intertwined with power and wealth, but an unforeseen factor, French diplomat Henri Lambert's presence in the Gulf of Aden was about to shift the course of events. Recognising the benefits of European backing, as demonstrated by British dominance in Aden, Abubakr saw Lambert as a potential ally, fostering a relationship driven by mutual economic interests, strategic ambition, and a shared affinity that would shape his political trajectory.

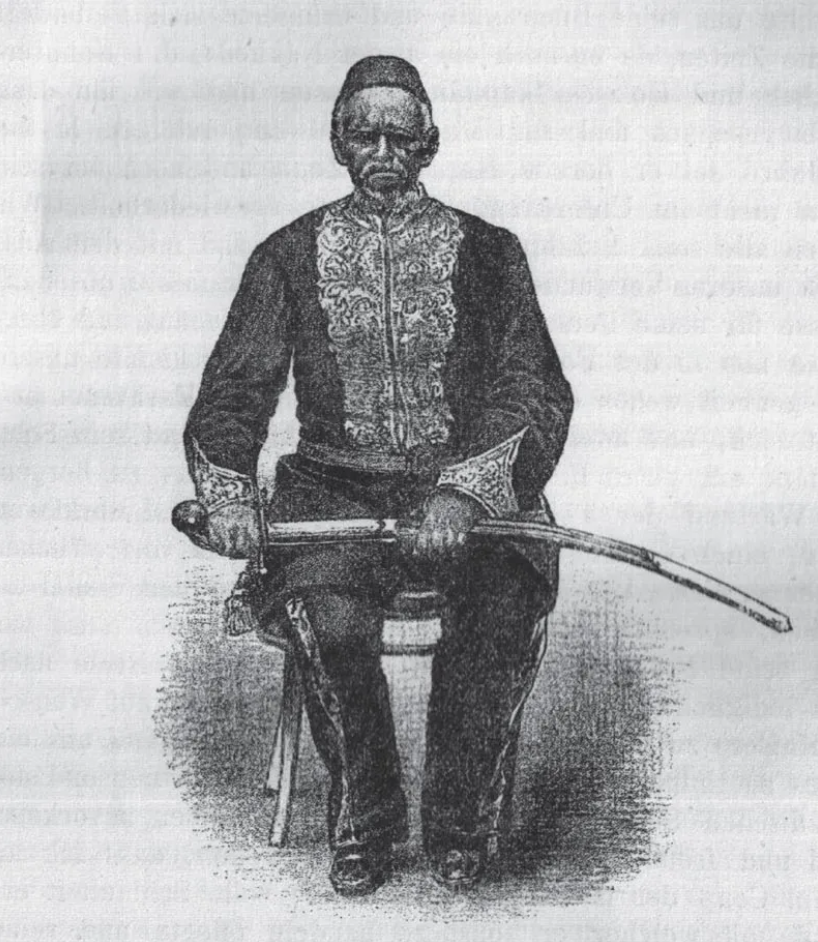
Engraving of Abubakr Ibrahim Chehem wearing his Khedival uniform, adorned with Ottoman decorations

A key source of conflict between Aboubakr Pasha and Sharmarke Ali Salih, which later contributed to Sharmarke's attempted coup in Zeila, was the wreck of the Caïman. This French steam-powered war corvette last docked in Aden on January 20, 1854, before running aground near Zeila shortly thereafter. As governor of the region at the time, Sharmarke aided the ship and its crew, evacuating Commander Cormier and his men. In appreciation, Cormier granted Sharmarke permission to salvage materials from the wreck, particularly the valuable copper sheathing. Exceeding this authorisation, Sharmarke employed Khamite workers from Aden to fully dismantle the vessel's machinery, extracting large quantities of copper, brass, iron, and wood. While some materials were sold, the rest were stored in Zeila. After Sharmarke's dismissal as governor and Aboubakr's subsequent appointment, Aboubakr seized the remaining salvaged materials along with Sharmarke's other possessions. These were only returned following direct orders from Mahmoud Pasha.

In February 1856, Sharmarke left Aden for ZeIla, where he allied with his brother Deria and the pirate Muhammed ʿAbdi Liban of ʿAin Tarad. After recovering some of his confiscated property, he blockaded ZeIla with seven boats, incited the ʿIssa to attack, plundered and destroyed vessels, and set fire to the town. Abubakr, anticipating the assault, withdrew to Tadjoura and informed the British. On April 1, Brigadier General Coghlan sent Captain Playfair to investigate, and on April 5 a confrontation took place aboard a British ship where Abubakr accused Sharmarke of piracy. Sharmarke denied the charges but was reprimanded, barred from Aden, and later submitted a letter of obedience on April 23, 1856. Abubakr subsequently returned to ZeIla, consolidating his position, while his early encounters with Europeans included meetings with the Frenchman Henri Lambert during his first voyage to the Gulf of Aden.

In October 1855 Henri Lambert traveled from Aden to Tadjoura, where he established cordial relations with the chief Adallom Mahammad, prior to a brief visit to Zeila and dealings with Abubakr for the first time. In early 1856 he returned again, this time warmly received on the lifting of Sharmaarkey's blockade, and having discussions with Abubakr for many hours on trade. After the completion of negotiations for supplies of livestock, he went to Obock, al-Mukha, and al-Hudayda, where Mahmud Pasha again welcomed him. In his third assignment, between September 2 and 14, 1856, Lambert concentrated on the Gulf of Tadjoura and Obock, establishing contacts with the local chiefs and visiting Zeila and the Musha Islands. Abubakr welcomed him with military honors and festivities at ZeIla. These frequent visits strengthened Lambert's relations with Abubakr, whose influence among the Afar was growing, as British officials in Aden were starting to view the rising popularity of the young Frenchman in the region with growing suspicion.

In 1857, the customs farm at Zeila was contested between Abubakr, the incumbent, and Sharmarke, who sought to regain the post after the replacement of Governor Mahmud Pasha by Ahmad Salam Wudada. Although Abubakr secured the concession with a higher bid, Sharmarke retaliated by reviving the Caiman shipwreck dispute, leading Ahmad Pasha to imprison Abubakr and extort a ransom of 5,000 thalers. Abubakr was eventually released but withdrew from politics to focus on trade. In early 1858, the Frenchmen Mequet and Consul Lambert intervened during a naval expedition, pressing Ahmad Pasha to reimburse the ransom on the grounds that the affair harmed Ottoman prestige. Persuaded by the promise of a labor supply for Mauritius, Ahmad complied, and Lambert later ensured that the value of the disputed wreck was restored to the French state.

In June 1859, reports spread that the Nassery had wrecked near Djibouti, with its commander Lambert allegedly drowning while attempting escape on a raft. Although some of the crew reached shore, suspicions arose when none of the Nassery's sailors perished in the incident. Abubakr, unconvinced by official explanations, pressed the British governor at Aden for an inquiry, suggesting Lambert had been assassinated. Despite an investigation led by Captain Playfair, which relied on Somali testimonies and dismissed foul play, Abubakr continued to petition Ottoman authorities, compelling Aḥmad Pasha to take up the case formally. By July, key crew members of the Nassery were detained, while evidence, including bloodstains on the vessel, fueled allegations of murder.

The affair escalated further in May 1861, when Commander Fleuriot de Langle of the French vessel Somme confronted Ottoman authorities at al-Ḥudayda, demanding the surrender of Sharmarke and his alleged accomplices. After tense negotiations, Aḥmad Pasha yielded, and Sharmarke, along with his banker Awad ibn Faqil, was taken aboard the Somme. Subsequent appeals to higher Ottoman officials in Jeddah stalled, prompting de Langle to plan for their transfer to Réunion and eventually France or Constantinople for trial. Before this could occur, however, Sharmarke died suddenly on 15 May 1861, reportedly from an aneurysm. His final acts, including discarding his traditional attire and embracing European dress in humility, were interpreted either as resignation or as a final defiant gesture.

== Political career ==
He lived in a fortified stone house resembling a citadel and controlled a vast household of several hundred slaves, organised into enclosures by age and function. His administration was simple yet effective, relying on orally given orders and rudimentary paperwork sealed with his personal mark. Known for his tactical flexibility, Abubakr maintained authority by anticipating events and reacting strategically, allowing him to survive political challenges. By the 1860s, as his relations with the French faded, he increasingly oriented himself toward Ottoman-Egyptian patronage under Khedive Ismail.

During the period of Muhammad Ali’s domination over the Hijaz and Yemen in the early 19th century, the port of ZeIlaʿ also fell under the authority of Cairo. Contemporary Egyptian officials, such as Jamali Bey, expressed anticipation for the reintegration of ZeIlaʿ into Egypt and even proposed establishing an independent government there that would unite the villages, coastal regions, roads, and mountains stretching from ZeIla to Massawa and up to the Ethiopian frontier under the authority of Khedive Ismaʿil. Abubakr, a key local intermediary, shifted his allegiance from the Ottomans to the Egyptians after failing to secure French support, became an influential figure in Egyptian policy. By the 1870s, he was acting as an indispensable go-between for correspondence between the khedive and regional rulers, including Menelik of Shewa, who relied on Abubakr’s mediation while carefully avoiding provocation of Emperor Yohannes IV. On 12 February 1871, the Egyptian corvette Sa'ka anchored at Zeila with Mumtaz Pasha on board, who distributed subsidies on behalf of Cairo, raised the Egyptian flag in accordance with prior agreements, and extended Egyptian influence to Berbera and Tadjoura. Local rulers, such as the Afar chief Hummad, welcomed these overtures, requesting additional arms and supplies while signalling willingness to establish closer ties with Egypt. This period marked the beginning of a short-lived “honeymoon” between Egypt and the East African coast, though Cairo's ambitions faced diplomatic resistance from both Britain and the Ottoman Empire, particularly concerning the still-independent Somali ports of Berbera and Bulhar. In the 1870s, Egyptian authorities portrayed their collaboration with prominent regional figures, including two influential slave traders Abubakr Pasha and Al-Zubayr Rahma Mansur, as part of their anti-slavery stance, despite the ongoing slave trade occurring openly. Abubakr, being governor of Zeila, was recognised more for his political influence than his role in the slave trade. After receiving the title of pasha from Cairo, he and another trader visited the city. In 1875, Zeila became Egypt's strategic base for the planned conquest of Harar. In August of that year, Muhammad Ra'uf Pasha arrived in Zeila with a firman from the khedive, instructing Abubakr to support a "geographic scientific voyage" to Harar which was a diplomatic façade intended to conceal military intentions from the British and maintain regional strategic balance.

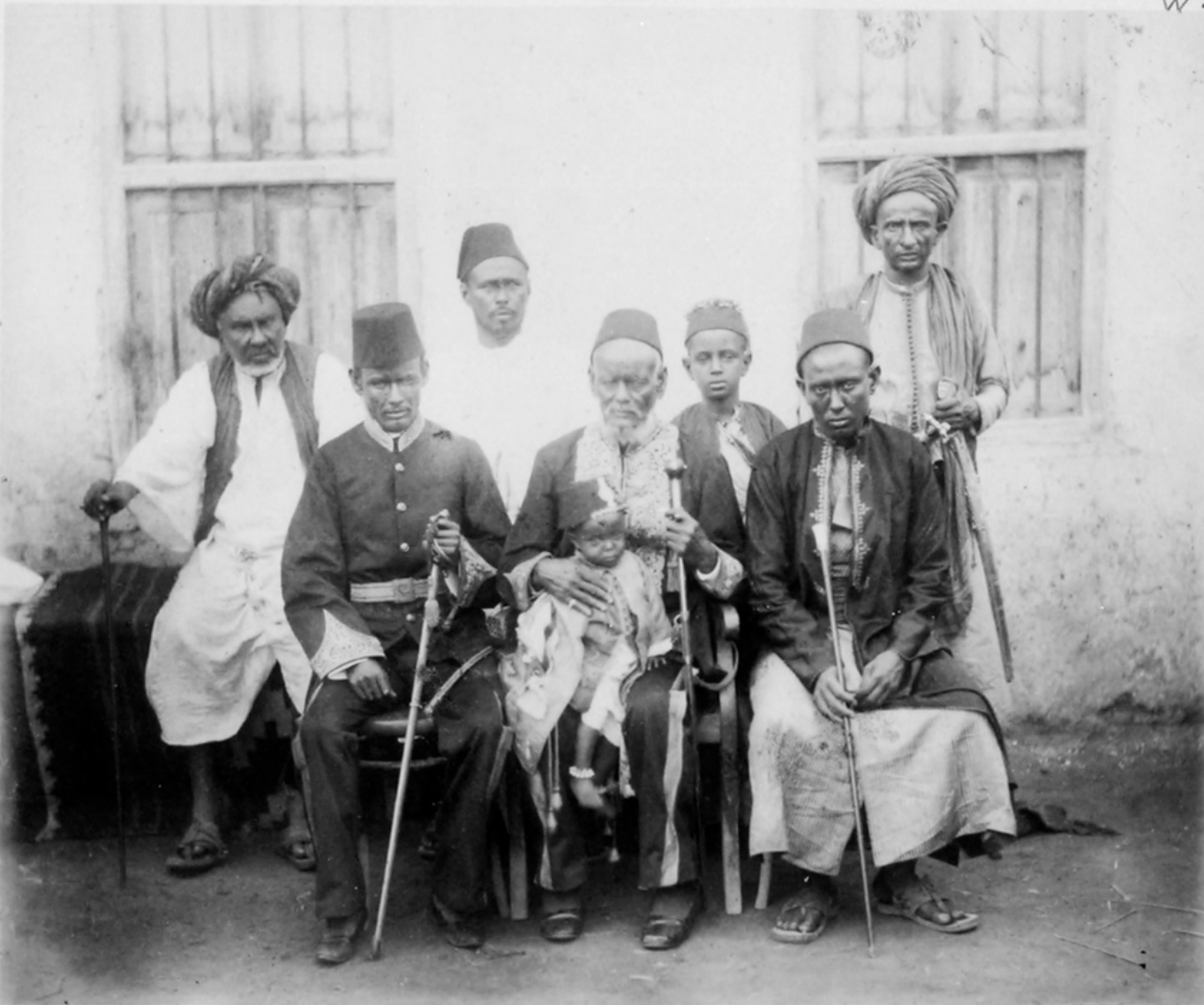
A photograph of Abubakr Pasha with his family by Philipp Paulitschke in 1885.

In October 1875, following the Egyptian conquest of Harar, Abubakr emerged as a key intermediary, securing appointment as wakil of ZeIla with third-class rank. Though praised for his loyalty and efficiency, Cairo remained wary of his independence and limited his authority, with the khedive stressing that real administration would remain in trusted Egyptian hands. Abubakr, whose wealth was tied to slave trading, faced growing tension as Egyptian rule sought to modernize governance and curtail his influence. By late 1875, realising his position was precarious, he strategically curtailed cooperation, offering only minimal collaboration to preserve his status. Egyptian weakness in securing trade routes and tribal unrest further eroded his power, culminating in the Gadabursi threat near Borama and tensions with the new Ugas in 1883. While initially indispensable to Rauf Pasha, Abubakr ultimately withheld support during Ismail Pasha's attempted expansion into Awsa, marking a shift from loyal collaborator to cautious, self-preserving figure within the khedival administration. In the late 1870s and early 1880s, Egyptian attempts to secure control of routes toward Harar met with resistance from local tribes, and their presence in the region began to weaken. Abubakr, operating from Tadjoura and ZeIla, cautiously navigated between Egyptian, British, and French interests, warning French officer Denis de Rivoyre of Cairo's ambitions on the Afar coast. In 1880, Egypt sought to claim sovereignty over the area and briefly raised its flag at Obock and Ras Bir in January 1881, but French forces quickly removed it, prompting only limited diplomatic protest. A second Egyptian attempt at Ilat in June 1883 also failed. Throughout these events, Abubakr worked to maintain his influence while reinforcing France's confidence in his position.

He found himself increasingly strained by the rising pressure of anti-slavery sentiment, particularly from the British and the international press. Once firmly entrenched in the regional slave trade, he now faced constant scrutiny and was forced to remain vigilant amid a shifting political climate. Although British influence in Egypt at the time was limited, their growing presence posed a significant threat to local authority. He remained one of the few figures whose power extended across Zeyla’wiyya, but even this did not ensure that routes remained accessible—rather, his wealth and influence made them effectively closed to his enemies and critics. There was speculation that the British intended to eliminate him discreetly or allow him to vanish under “natural” circumstances to avoid the public shock of a violent removal. British officials accused him of brigandage, theft, and involvement in the slave trade, prompting a directive for the Egyptian government to revoke and replace him without delay. The same directive also condemned Negus Menilek, who had publicly outlawed slavery but was believed to have visited Abubakr covertly. In the face of this new political storm, Abubakr once again managed to manoeuvre towards survival. He often fantasised about freeing himself from the interference of foreigners intent on imposing their will. With a mix of sarcasm and resignation, he remarked to Denis de Rivoyre, “At this very moment I was still a Pasha of Egypt, now I have become an Arab again.” Whether this was bitter irony or reluctant acceptance is unclear, but the reality was that he had been reduced to a mere figure in an increasingly untenable position. Despite futile diplomatic attempts with the British, it was ultimately to France that Abubakr turned this time definitively for his final refuge.

In 1885, an affair occurred in Khor Ambaddo which was a diplomatic incident involving British and French interests in the Horn of Africa. Fearing that trade from ZeIla would shift to the nearby Khor Ambaddo being seen by the French as a potential terminus for a railway to Harar so the British challenged French claims to the area. On September 14, a group of Somali mercenaries, under the British officer Captain King, attempted to assert Egyptian authority by raising a flag, but were thwarted by local leader Abubakr, who had warned the French. In retaliation, King placed Abubakr and his son under house arrest, accusing them of conspiring with local factions. Abubakr fled with one of his sons to the French consulate on the night of September 21. The next day, the French warship Météore arrived in Zeila, and its commander, Lieutenant Latour, intervened, insisting on protection for Abubakr as a French protégé. Fearing escalation, French officials, including Administrator Lagarde, moved to deescalate the situation. Complicating matters was Abubakr's alleged invocation of a secret treaty placing him under French protection, the existence of which caused diplomatic embarrassment. Despite tensions, the affair did not lead to open conflict, and by November 1885, both London and Paris had begun negotiations to resolve the dispute peacefully.

== Death ==
Once a powerful and respected figure in Zeila, he became a stranger in his own city following the events of 1885, which marked the collapse of his authority and the end of an era. Despite a lifetime spent maintaining control through both strength and diplomacy, the humiliation inflicted by British officer King deeply affected him, leaving him psychologically shaken and sensing the inevitable decline of his influence. Surrounded by a world he no longer recognised, increasingly shaped by foreign powers and modernity, he faced his final days in isolation. Rumors suggested the British were eager for his demise, though no proof linked them to the sudden illness that struck him and one of his sons. Descriptions from the time still portrayed him as animated and resilient, yet by December 8, 1885, Abubakr had died in Zeila, with two of his sons by his side, one a child of three and the other thirty-five. Abubakr's death in Zeila at the beginning of December 1885, and the involvement of Italy and France on the Somali coast, improved the status and military might of the Somali leaders.

== Legacy ==
Abubakr Pasha's legacy endured chiefly through the breadth of his descendants, whose marriages and alliances linked his family to both the ruling houses of Tadjoura and the Ethiopian imperial dynasty. His eldest son, Ibrahim Bey, was said by Paul Soleillet to have governed Tadjoura with the title of bey, while Alfred Bardey claimed that Abubakr himself had been recognised as sultan of the town. Later historians, however, consider this to be a confusion, as the sultanate was traditionally reserved for the Ad‘ali line. Abubakr's influence nevertheless derived from his strategic marriages and the wealth he drew from his estates and trading ventures around Zeila.

His second son, Mahammad Pasha, also known as Mahammad Naggadras (1845–1915), became one of the most prominent figures of the family. He established the settlement of Aramé in Ifat and was a leader amongst Afar merchants in Baté. His granddaughter Fatuma married Lij Iyasu, grandson and uncrowned successor of Emperor Menelik II, in 1913. After Iyasu was deposed in 1916, Fatuma fled into French-controlled territory, where she gave birth to a son named Menelik in September 1917. Through this line, the family became connected to the Ethiopian imperial household, although its fortunes later waned. The fourth son, Kamil Effendi, also left a distinct mark. Following a dispute with his tribe, he departed Urbabu for Erer around 1884, a move that coincided with the French occupation of Tadjoura and the withdrawal of Egyptian troops. Oral tradition recalls him as a remarkable figure, respected not only for his military leadership but also for his poetry.

Throughout his life, Abubakr entered into numerous marriages and unions that reflected his standing and the political strategies of his time. He is recorded as having at least fifteen wives or concubines of Ad‘ali, Afar, Somali, Arab, Turkish, and Ethiopian origin. These unions produced a family of some thirty-three children, of whom at least eleven established enduring male lines. Amongst his descendants were Burhan Bey, Musa, Ridwan, and Abdulkadir, while several daughters forged alliances that extended the family's influence across the region. Certain branches of descent stand out. Through his son Ali, the family was linked to Amina, who became the first wife of Menelik Iyasu. Another important line, through Hummad Effendi, produced Hummed b. Mahammad, who later became the twenty-fourth sultan of Tadjoura.
