= Ottoman Zeila =

Sanjak of the Ottoman Empire from 1559 to 1874

- Sanjak of the Ottoman Empire
- 1559–1874
- Flag

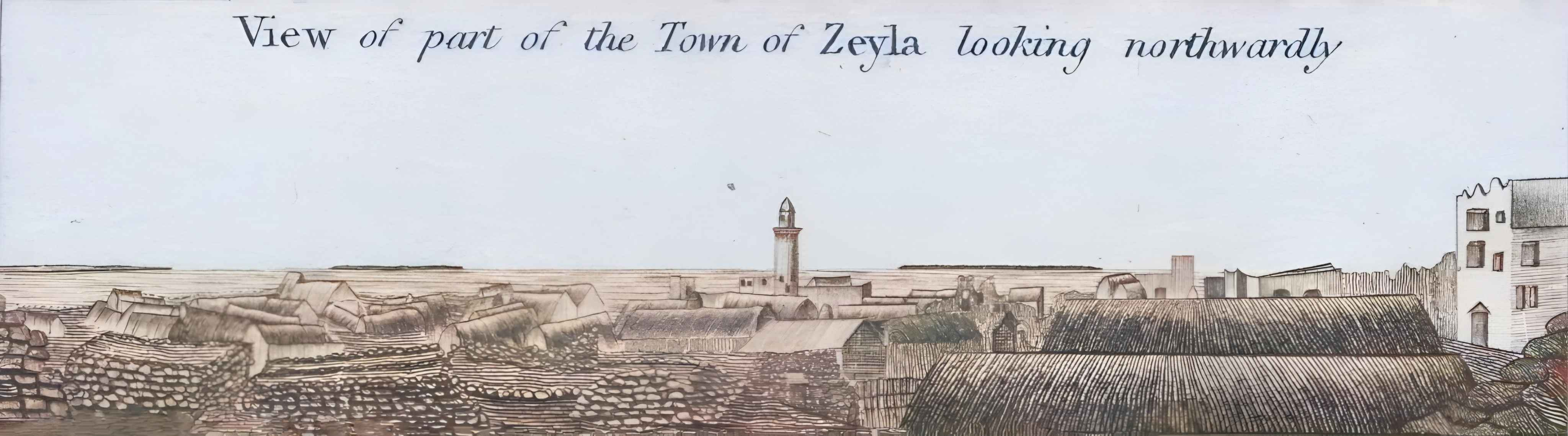
- Engraving depicting the port of Zeila by A. Macpherson in 1814
- Capital: Zeila
- Government
- Dawlar
  - 1559-1561: Özdemir Pasha
  - 1861-1874: Abubakr Pasha
- History
  - Established: 1559
  - Disestablished: 1874
Preceded by	Succeeded by
Adal Sultanate	Khedivate's Somali Coast
- Today part of: Djibouti; Somalia (de jure) ∟ Somaliland (de facto)

Ottoman Zeila was an Ottoman sanjak of the Habesh Eyalet centered around Zeila that was under intermittent control between the 16th and 19th centuries, after the collapse of the Adal Sultanate.

== History ==
=== Background ===
The Ottoman activities in Ethiopia proper preceded their invasion. They had supported the campaign of Adal Sultanate (which had begun in 1527) which was an Ottoman ally and attacked Ethiopia with the help of 200 Turkish arquebusiers. Following the Imam's reverse after the Battle of Jarte in 1542 they had sent him badly needed aid in the form of matchlockmen sent to Adal at a time when firearms in the region were rare: 10 cannons with artillery men, as well as many as 900 gunmen in 1542. This support led to the destruction of almost all the Portuguese force under Christopher da Gama in the Battle of Wofla. However, the surviving Portuguese forces teamed up with an Ethiopian contingent led by Gelawdewos and the Christian army was able to decisively defeat the Muslims in the Battle of Wayna Daga. Following this episode, the remainder of the Adalite-Ottoman army in Ethiopia withdrew. However a reprisal conflict in Fatagar erupted where Gelawdewos would be defeated and killed by Nur ibn Mujahid.

=== Arrival of the Ottomans ===
The Ottomans invaded the Kingdom of Medri Bahri, now modern-day Eritrea, in 1557 with a force of perhaps 1400-1500 under Özdemir Pasha. They first captured Massawa, Hirgigo and Beylul then moved inland and captured the regional capital of Debarwa from the Medri Bahri and the Abyssinian Kingdom Ozdemir Pasha had also captured the northern and north-west parts of Ethiopia A fort was also constructed at Hergigo; a planned fort at Massawa had to be abandoned due to a lack of suitable building materials. Debarwa was then given to the local noble Ga'éwah, the sister of Ahmed ibn Ibrahim al-Ghazi's mother-in-law.

The Ottoman Empire sought to expand its influence in the Red Sea region during the mid-16th century, largely to counteract Portuguese dominance and solidify its control over key maritime trade routes. Özdemir Pasha, a Circassian Mamluk commander, led the Ottoman campaign to extend their reach into Nubia, Eritrea, and the coastal regions of the Horn of Africa. As part of this campaign, Özdemir Pasha seized several key locations, including Massawa and Suakin, before advancing towards Zeila. According to historian Richard Pankhurst, "Özdemir swiftly captured the entire stretch from Massawa to Zeila, establishing the Ottoman Province of Habesh in 1557. The campaign to capture Zeila was characterized by its swiftness, as Özdemir Pasha met little resistance. Upon seizing the city, he declared it part of the Habesh Eyalet, a newly created Ottoman province that encompassed key coastal territories. Historian Edward A. Alpers notes that Özdemir directed his forces across the eastern desert, capturing Zeila to establish Ottoman dominance in the region.

The Bahr Negash Yeshaq had bad relations with Emperor Menas, who had just assumed the throne, so in 1561 he revolted against Menas, but the following year he was defeated in battle. Yeshaq then fled to the Ottomans and promised to cede them Debarwa, Massawa, Arqiqo, and all the land in between in return for their help. In 1562 the combined forces of Osman Pasha and Yeshaq defeated Menas at Enderta in the Tigray region. Yeshaq and the Emperor later made peace, and the Ottomans withdrew from Debarwa in 1572, which Yeshaq quickly occupied, but he returned it to the Ottomans as a result of the earlier agreement.

However In 1576, Sarsa Dengel, Menas' successor would lead the Abyssinians and defeat an Adalite army at the Battle of Webi River where he captured and executed the Adal Sultan along with some of the Adal's nobility thereby permanently damaging Adal as a military power. The Ottoman Empire, under the command of Özdemir Pasha, captured the port city of Zeila from the weakened Adalites in 1559. After failed reconciliation attempts between Sarsa Dengal and the Bahr Negus, he then marched north to Tigray where he dealt the Ottomans and their Medri Bahri allies a crushing defeat at the Battle of Addi Qarro, killing Ottoman Commander Ahmad Pasha along with the rebellious Bahr Negus Yeshaq. Dengel then marched on Debarwa and seized the city, finding it defenceless and destroying its mosque. Hizir Pasha then took office in 1579 and reinforced his army recruiting 300 musketeers, 100 horsemen, extra ammunitions and 200 soldiers from Bayram Bey’s forces in Yemen. Hizir Pasha defeated the Ethiopian army near Massawa and Arkiko. He inflicted another defeat against the Ethiopian army near Debarwa and seized Tigray. Mustafa Pasha succeeded him in 1582 and later defeated the army of Daharagat. The Emperor Sarsa Dengal would make peace with the Ottomans in 1589 ending the Ottoman–Ethiopian war.

Following the establishment of Ottoman rule, Zeila became an important Ottoman port city under Özdemir Pasha's governorship. The strategic position of the city allowed the Ottomans to monitor and control trade routes along the Red Sea and the Gulf of Aden. This consolidation of power enabled the Ottomans to project influence deeper into the Horn of Africa and resist Portuguese incursions into the region. The Ottoman presence in Zeila significantly influenced the city's development as a regional trade hub, connecting the Arabian Peninsula, Africa, and the Indian Ocean. However, the city's fortunes declined in the later centuries with the waning of Ottoman influence in the region. The French historian, Amelie Chekroun, points out that the port of Zeila on the African shore of the Gulf was coveted by the powers on both shores and regularly came under the control of Harar or Awsa as Ottoman sources suggest that during the second half of the 16th century it was under the control of Habesh Eyalet for a few years. According to the chronicles of Awsa, the governor of Zeila, Garad Lado', built the walls surrounding the town to prevent raids in 1572-1577 whilst the Sultan Muhammed ibn Nasir was in conflict with Sarsa Dengel. Italian scholar, Enrico Cerulli, notes that although Zeila was subjected to governors nominated by the Imam of Aussa which enjoyed de-facto autonomy from usually backing up the Imam's rivals.

=== Qasimid rule of Zeila ===
By 1608, Imam al-Mansur (the victorious) regained control over the highlands and signed a truce for 10 years with the Ottomans. Imam al-Mansur al-Qasim died in 1620. His son Al-Mu'ayyad Muhammad succeeded him and confirmed the truce with the Ottomans. In 1627, the Ottomans lost Aden and Lahej. 'Abdin Pasha was ordered to suppress the rebels, but failed, and had to retreat to Mocha. Al-Mu'ayyad Muhammad expelled the Ottomans from Sana'a in 1628, only Zabid and Mocha remained under Ottoman possession. Al-Mu'ayyad Muhammad captured Zabid in 1634 and allowed the Ottomans to leave Mocha peacefully.

Zeila would come under Yemeni control of the Qasimid dynasty via Mocha. In 1695 the Qasimids had reconquered Yemen and removed the Ottomans and they would extend their control and trade with the Somali coast, improving trade and encouraging the arrival of many vessels from the Somali coast to Yemen. The city was also used to imprison dissidents from Mocha, Zeila was governed by an Emir/Dawlar under the Sheikhs of Mokha or Imams of Sana'a who would garrison a small army of troops, but their control and authority did not extend beyond the city of Zeila. Assisted by cannons and a few mercenaries armed with matchlocks, the Dawlar of Zeila succeeded in fending off incursions by both the disunited nomads of the interior, who had penetrated the area, as well as brigands in the Gulf of Aden.

Al-Mutawakkil Isma'il, who conquered Yemen in its entirety, from Asir in the north to Dhofar in the east. During his reign, and during the reign of his successor, Al-Mahdi Ahmad (1676–1681), the imamate implemented some of the harshest discriminatory laws (ghiyar) against the Jews of Yemen, which culminated in the expulsion of all Jews (Exile of Mawza) They were to be sent to Zeilaʻ, a place along the African coast of the Red Sea, where they would be confined for life, or else repent and accept the tenets of Islam. But would instead be sent to Mawza' in the Tihama coastal plain.

In 1722, Al-Mutawakkil al-Qasim, would send troops outside of Zeila into the land of the Somalis to capture Awsa, but his troops felt a big difference in manpower. He would send his men deeper into Somali land to capture Awsa under the command of Abdullah Al-Jameel. The leader of the expedition was informed that the Somalis were many, and they did not have the number nor the strength to fight them. The expedition failed, so his troops retreated to Zeila, ending the campaign.

=== Ottoman recapture ===
The Ottomans were concerned about the British expansion from the British ruled subcontinent to the Red Sea and Arabia. They returned to the Tihama in 1849 after an absence of two centuries. Rivalries and disturbances continued among the Zaydi imams, between them and their deputies, with the ulema, with the heads of tribes, as well as with those who belonged to other sects. Some citizens of Sana'a were desperate to return law and order to Yemen and asked the Ottoman Pasha in Tihama to pacify the country. Yemeni merchants knew that the return of the Ottomans would improve their trade, for the Ottomans would become their customers. An Ottoman expedition force tried to capture Sana'a, but was defeated and had to evacuate the highlands. The Opening of the Suez Canal in 1869, strengthened the Ottoman decision to remain in Yemen. In 1872, military forces were dispatched from Constantinople and moved beyond the Ottoman stronghold in the lowlands (Tihama) to conquer Sana'a. By 1873, the Ottomans succeeded in conquering the northern highlands. Sana'a became the administrative capital of Yemen Vilayet.

=== Deposition of the El-Barr dynasty ===
In 1841 Sharmarke took control of Ottoman Zeila with fifty Matchlock men, two cannons and an army of mounted spearmen managed to invade Zeila and depose its Arab Governor, Mohammed Al-Barr. Sharmarke used the canons to fire at the city walls which frightened Al Barr's followers and caused them to flee. Sharmarke succeeded Al Barr as the ruler of Zeila and its dependencies.

Sharmarke's influence was not limited to the coast as he had many allies in the interior of the Somali country and even further in Abyssinia. Among his allies were the Kings of Shewa. When there was tension between the Amir of Harar Abu Bakr II ibn `Abd al-Munan and Sharmarke, as a result of the Amir arresting one of his agents in Harar, Sharmarke persuaded the son of Sahle Selassie, the King of Shewa, to imprison on his behalf about 300 citizens of Harar then resident in Shewa, for a length of two years. In 1855, in an act seen as defiant of foreign powers, Sharmarke refused to sell to M. Richet, the French agent at Jeddah, a house in Zeila, citing "how easily an Agency becomes a fort", and preferring "a considerable loss to the presence of dangerous friends".

== Military ==
Throughout the history of the Ottoman presence, Zeila had a garrison of troops. Under pasha Kara Naʾib, the city housed a garrison of 700 troops and 70 cannons under the governor Mehemmed Agha, who collected customs from the 10-20 Indian and Portuguese ships that visited the port each year to purchase livestock, oil and honey.

== See also ==
- Ottoman conquest of Zeila
- History of Somaliland
- List of Muslim empires and dynasties
- List of Sunni Muslim dynasties
