= Assassination of Henri Lambert =

1859 murder in Moucha Island, Djibouti

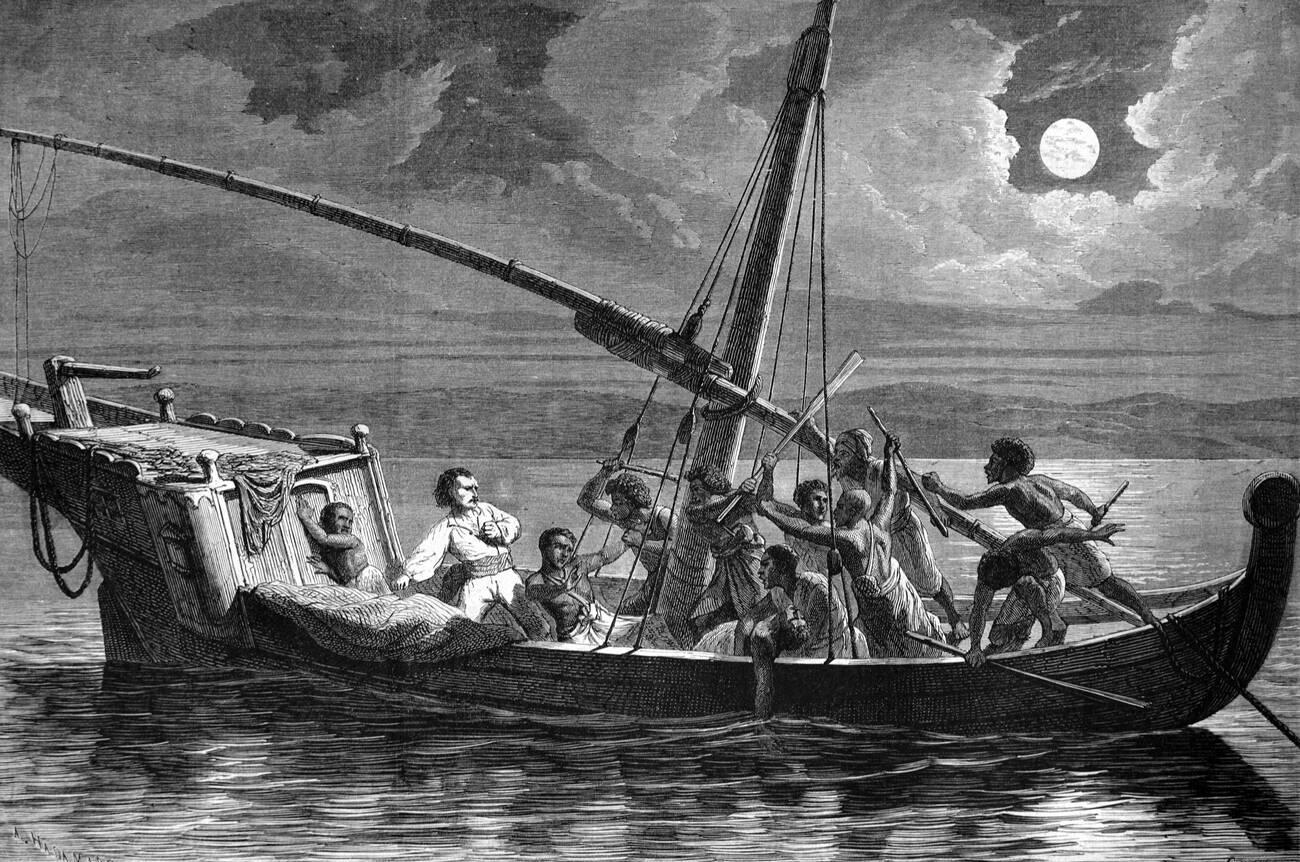
- Engraving depicting Henri Lambert's assassination published in Le Tour du monde in 1862.
- Location: Moucha Island, Djibouti
- Date: 4 June 1859; 167 years ago
- Target: Henri Lambert
- Attack type: Lynching
- Victims: Henri Lambert; Balassa; Thama
- Perpetrator: Sharmarke Ali Salih
- Assailants: Abdillahi bin Edlie; Robly Gely Edlie; Assowah Gedy; Gely Gedy; Farah Edlie; Ali Sanguely; Farah Ouroueni; El Terre; Durbadi; Wahbirrie Bahdoon; Farah Roblie; Mahomed Abouker

On June 4, 1859, Henri Lambert was assassinated, on board the dhow Nasseri, which intended to visit Tadjoura to bid farewell to Abubakr Pasha before returning to France. He had already informed the French about the benefits of establishing a colony opposite the British stronghold of Aden.

In 1861, Sharmarke Ali Salih was believed by the French to have a role in the murder of Henri Lambert, a former French consular agent at Aden while on his way to Tadjoura, and who was incidentally a major supporter of Sharmarke's main rival Abubakr Ibrahim Chehem, an Afar slave trader. Both the Turkish Pasha of Al-Hodeydah and the British Residency in Aden believed Sharmarke was wholly innocent of the charge, but the Haji and some of his supporters were arbitrarily arrested and handed to the French navy for a trial in Constantinople (although the trial was later moved to Jeddah).

== Background ==
=== The Caïman incident ===
A major source of the feud between Aboubakr Pasha and Sharmarke Ali Salih, which later fueled Sharmarke's attempted coup in Zeila, was the wreck of the Caïman. This French steam-powered war corvette last docked in Aden on January 20, 1854, before running aground near Zeila shortly afterward. Sharmarke, then the governor of the region, came to the ship's aid. Recognizing that the vessel had to be abandoned, he assisted in evacuating the crew and Commander Cormier. In gratitude, Cormier authorized Sharmarke to salvage materials from the hull, particularly the copper sheathing, which was highly valuable in the area.

Sharmake went beyond this permission, employing Khamite workers from Aden to fully dismantle the ship's machinery. He recovered large quantities of copper, brass, iron, and wood. Some of these materials were sold, while the rest were stored in Zeila. Following Sharmarke's removal as governor and Aboubakr's appointment in his place, Aboubakr seized Sharmarke's remaining possessions, including the salvaged materials. He only returned them after receiving direct orders from Mahmoud Pasha.

=== Dispute over Zeila's lease ===
In 1857, the customs lease in Zeila was contested between Abubakr, the current holder, and Sharmake, who sought to reclaim the position. Their rivalry intensified with the arrival of a new governor in al-Hudayda, Ahmad Salam Wudada, known for his cruelty and corruption. Despite Sharmake offering 1,000 thalers for the lease, Abubakr outbid him with an additional 500 piastres, winning the contract. Frustrated, Sharmake escalated the dispute by accusing Abubakr of misappropriating 4,000 thalers worth of copper from the wreck of the Caïman, a French warship that had run aground near Zeila in 1854. Exploiting their rivalry, Ahmad Pasha imprisoned Abubakr without trial and released him only after extracting a 5,000-thaler ransom, which he and Sharmake shared. Disillusioned, Abubakr retired to Ambabbo, leaving behind the volatile politics of Zeila.

In May 1858, Captain Charles Méquet of the French brig Génie visited Zeila during a mission to explore the Red Sea and recruit free labor for plantations in Réunion. Méquet inspected the Caïman wreck and found its salvage value negligible, a result of prior scavenging by both Sharmake and Abubakr. Partnering with Henri Lambert, the French consul, Méquet traveled to al-Hudayda, where they convinced Ahmad Pasha to refund the ransom extracted from Abubakr. Lambert later ensured the funds were returned to the French government, citing the Caïman's French ownership.

== Prelude ==
=== Lambert's relations with Sharmake Ali Salih ===
Aboubakr's return to Tadjoura, after being imprisoned by Ahmed Pasha, did not change the fact that he had to deal with Sharmake, the new holder of the lease over Zeila. In September 1858, upon the renewal of this position, no one contested it, and he was reappointed by the Pasha for another year. Lambert, needing forage for his trade animals awaiting shipment from Tadjoura, faced challenges as it was scarce in the area and could only be obtained in Zeila, now controlled by Sharmarke, his adversary following a ransom dispute. Tensions culminated when Lambert chartered a boat to Zeila to fetch Dakmi, a plant used for forage and hut coverings. The ship's captain, Ali Daoud, who had fled Zeila due to conflicts with Sharmarke, attempted to load goods in Sharmarke's absence. However, Sharmarke's brother, Burrie, who shared his hostility toward Lambert, seized the half-loaded boat and imprisoned the crew, despite their lack of wrongdoing.

Sharmake ordered troops to Tadjoura to seize a mule-laden boat, but Aboubakr's brother alerted Lambert, who secured it. On returning, Sharmake endorsed his brother's actions, detained the sailors for over two months, and kept the boat. After his release, Captain Ali Daoud filed a complaint against Lambert with the Pasha of Al-Hodeydah, while Lambert lodged a similar complaint against Sharmake.

Dini Ahmed Abou Baker, Aboubakr's cousin, carried a letter to Sharmake on Lambert's behalf. This letter, written in French, could not be read by Sharmarke's secretaries, who replied in Arabic:

"To our dear friend, Mr. Lambert, Consul, may God prolong the days of your life!

What we can tell you is that your letter has reached us. It is written in French. We do not know its contents. No one in the country here reads French or English.

We questioned Diny (the bearer of the letter). We asked him: 'Why did the Consul send you?' Diny answered: 'I don't know what the letter says, but the Consul explicitly requested a camel, a donkey, and the release of the imprisoned individual.'

Now, my friend, let me summarise: You are a man of wisdom and authority. Every time someone gives you deceitful reports, you believe them too easily. Beware of false reports. Verify the facts for yourself, as lying in this land is welcomed too readily.

The first time Salah Chahhim traveled to the Pasha, he took a letter from you and had an audience with him. He told you that Sharmarke had detained a servant of yours, tasked with collecting grass. But this woman had not been sent out to gather grass on your behalf. She was with someone unreliable, and when this individual was taken down, they began cutting Dakmi grass belonging to various homes. When Salah went to the Pasha, the truth was revealed, namely, that the grass did not belong to the Consul but was Dakmi grass belonging to others.

Do not lend your ear to lies, my friend. You are a man of authority; we are the Sultan's subjects. Anyone who comes to us is treated with respect. When you came to us, that is how we treated you. And this time, too, if you had come, we would have welcomed you just as we welcome everyone, that is to say, in the most honorable way. We would have even welcomed you better than others.

Farewell."

=== Assassination plot against Henri Lambert ===
Henri Lambert, facing financial and health difficulties, initially offered his resignation as French consul in Aden. However, he reconsidered after receiving a letter from Prince Napoleon urging him to continue his duties. Despite this, Lambert struggled with poverty and limited support from Paris. His challenges included the refusal of J. Gautier to replace him and critical reports from Commander Tricault. With help from his friend August

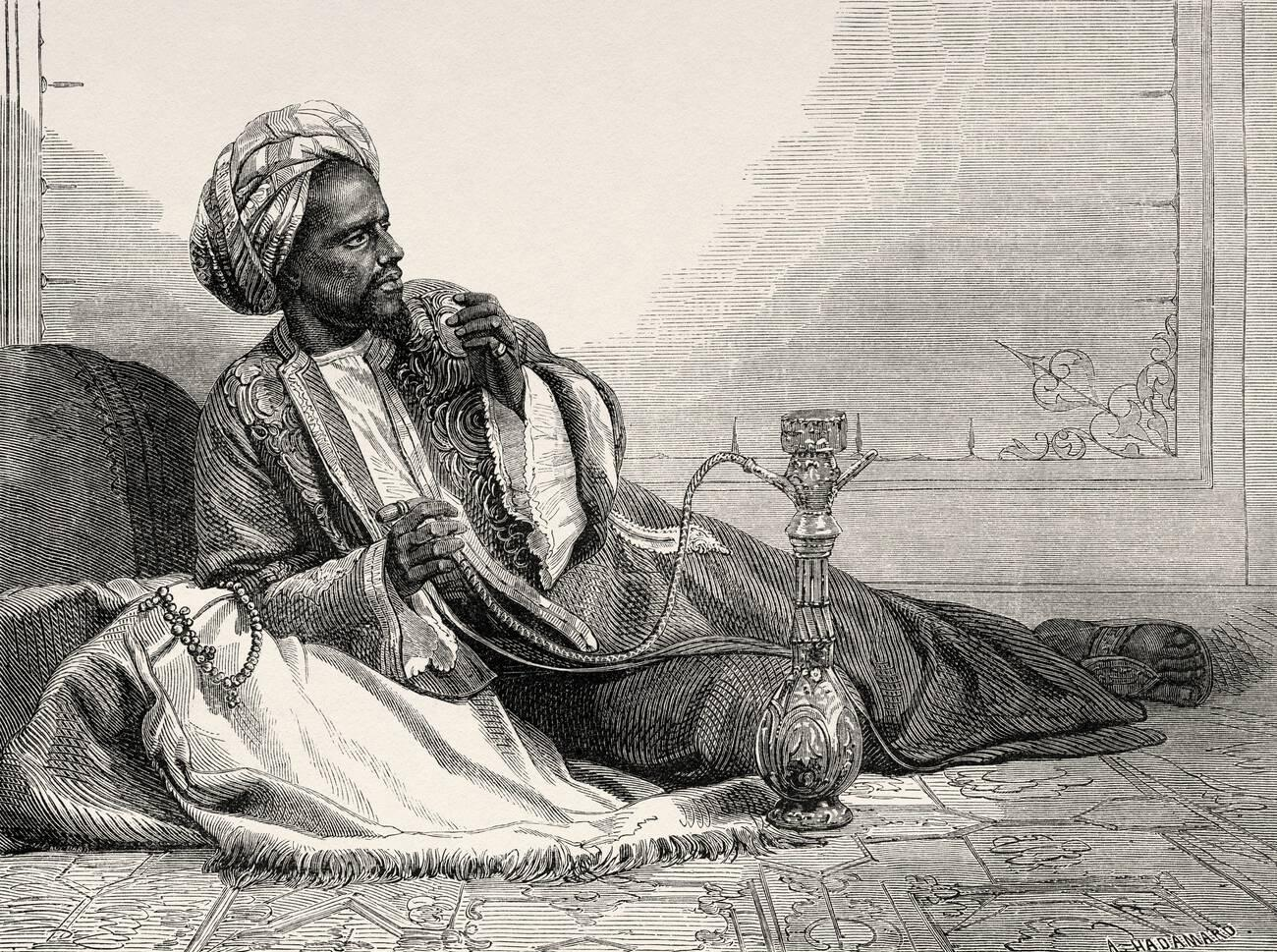
Ismael, Henri Lambert's interpreter at Aden, who spoke Afar, French, Arabic and Somali.

in Thomas, who brought verbal messages and financial aid, Lambert tried to manage his debts. However, his appeals for recognition and resources were ignored by the French government. Feeling abandoned, he officially resigned on April 27, 1859, thanking the English governor for his hospitality as he closed the consular agency. Lambert departed Aden on April 29, 1859, aboard the Nasseri, reaching Al-Hodeydah by April 30. He stayed in Yemen for about a month before departing. This gave Sharmarke, the opportunity to get rid of Lambert for good. He gathered around him a council composed of six men. Among them were his brother Burrie, Mohamed Hassan Robly, who was his trusted man, Ali Bar Omar Tour, one of his secretaries responsible for paying his soldiers, Hadji Osman, his secretary, and Furruj, a slave whose memory was relied upon. Sharmake was informed of Lambert's departure from Al-Hodeydah to the Nasseri, with Nacouda Abdillahi. His brother and he himself declare that they would indeed kill Lambert. Sharmarke has Hadji Osman write a letter addressed to Awadh Bel Fakil, his correspondent and banker in Al-Hodeydah. The terms of this assassination contract via Awadh.

Furruj, Sharmarke's other slave, carried a letter which had the following:

"Consul Lambert has left Aden for Hodeida. This man removed my command in Zeila; he made me pay 4,000 dollars. This was not enough for him; he continues to pursue me. Deal with the Nacouda of his boat, give him the necessary money. I have already dealt with him; the matter is between us. Any money you give him, I will pay if he succeeds."

Sharmarke offered 200 dollars to Abdillahi to kill Lambert and drafted two letters: one to Abdillahi with the order to kill the Consul, and another, for Awadh, written by his trusted slave Furruj, seeking the Pasha's approval. Mohamed Hassan Robly and Aly Bar Omar Tour, Sharmarke's confidant and Katib, carried the letters aboard a boat owned by Sayyid Mohamed el-Barr, captained by Samantar Sherwah. Before leaving, Sharmarke gave Ali Bar Omar Tour one of his two seals to authenticate the correspondence.

"The Pasha consented, and as soon as the messengers addressed to him returned, Awadh engaged Aly Bar and Mohamed to make me realise the role I was to play in the tragedy that was being prepared.

They persuaded me to come to a secluded house where they could talk more freely. I was then in the company of Samantar Sheroua, and I said to him: 'Accompany me and position yourself behind the mat partition of the house so that you can bear witness to the conversation that is about to take place between Sharmarke's envoys and me.'

These two emissaries began their work of corruption, alternately dazzling me with promises and threats. My conscience long debated the crime I was being asked to commit. Finally, overcome by the fear of death, which they also threatened me with, and tempted, I must admit, by the sight of a few Talaris [thalers], and by the promise that no legal action would ever be taken against me, I consented to kill Lambert; I only required that I be given a written assurance that I would never be held responsible or prosecuted for the crime. This letter had to provide me with the Pasha's consent and the cooperation of my crew.

The document I requested was drafted by Awadh and bore Sharmarke's seal, which Aly Bar had taken with him. With this authentic act, Sharmarke had succeeded in binding me to his cause, while my crew awaited only the moment to act."

Abdillahi later told his cousin Darrana that he obeyed because Mohamed Hassan Robly threatened to ban him from all ports if he refused. Meanwhile, Awadh Bel Fakil received other letters from the Pasha and gave one to Aly Bar Omar Tour, saying, "Your response has arrived." Aly delivered the letter to Sharmarke in Zeila on June 2, where it was read aloud. It stated:

"The matter is settled with the Pasha, and Abdillahi will get whatever he requests."

Ali Bar Omar Tour, present at the drafting of the letter, revealed it included the Pasha's agreement and assurance of impunity for the perpetrators. In Hodeida, rumors spread that Lambert sought to grant Zeila's governance to Aboubeker, undermining Sharmarke. Lambert's success was confirmed when he returned with the Pasha's sword as a gift. Three days later, Samantar Sherwah witnessed the Nasseri's departure and failed to persuade Abdillahi to delay, as Abdillahi refused to wait. Awadh Bel Fakil explained the delay to the Nacouda, advising him to await further response from the Pasha. The letters for Sharmarke arrived three days after Lambert's departure, and the boat set sail, likely on May 31. When the Nacouda reached Zeila on June 2 or 3, he was surprised not to find the Nasseri and delivered the Pasha's letters to Sharmarke. Lambert later went aboard on the dhow Nasseri, where from Mocha on the afternoon of Friday, June 3, 1859, departed towards Tadjoura.

=== The Nasseri's crew ===
Abdillahi became the Nacouda of the Nasseri. In Zeila, Sharmarke quickly learned of this. After an initial moment of anger, he decided to take advantage of the situation and instructed Abdillahi to recruit his crew exclusively from his kin. Abdillahi thus surrounded himself with trustworthy men, either family or clan members, almost all of whom were Issas or Gadaboursis originating from the Zeila region. From the outset, Lambert had placed himself in the hands of people who, by their origin, depended on his personal enemy. The Nasseri's crew was organised as follows: Abdillahi bin Edlie served as the Nacouda, with his brother, Robly Gely Edlie, acting as Second. Assowah Gedy, a cousin of the Nacouda, worked as a sailor alongside Gely Gedy, Farah Edlie (also known as Harrer), Ali Sanguely, Farah Ouroueni, El Terre, Durbadi, and Wahbirrie Bahdoon. Farah Roblie, the Nacouda's brother-in-law, served as the Mousse, while Mahomed Abouker, Gely Gedy's brother-in-law, was also part of the crew. Additionally, Lambert Henri traveled as a passenger, accompanied by his servant, Balassa.

== Assassination ==
The Nasseri anchored near the Moussa Islands in the afternoon of June 3, 1859. Abdillahi, the ship's captain, convened a council with his crew to determine Lambert's fate. Multiple testimonies provide details about the murder of Henri Lambert. According to the captain Abdillahi, Lambert was asleep at the stern when Abdillahi struck him with a crease (a sharp weapon). Lambert awoke, retaliated with a punch, and fled bleeding toward the mast, where he was struck again. The crew, armed with mooring pins and sticks, surrounded Lambert and killed him. Other accounts corroborate this, with some witnesses stating that Lambert was initially beaten with sticks while he slept. Ali Sanguely described the attack as occurring at the stern, while El Terree detailed how Lambert was held down and attacked by three sailors. Mohamed Aboukir added that Lambert was first struck by Abdillahi's spear, followed by a blow to the shoulder from Gely Edlie with an axe, and a final blow from another sailor. Once Lambert was dead, his body was stripped, weighted with stones, and thrown into the sea.

Following Lambert's murder, the crew deliberated on the fate of his servants: Balassa, Lambert's Abyssinian servant, and Thama, a freed black slave. During the chaos, the young crew members attacked Thama, likely due to racial prejudice. Eventually, both Balassa and Thama were thrown alive into the sea. Balassa was seen pleading for his life while swimming, but he and Thama were drowned. After disposing of Lambert and his servants, Abdillahi directed the Nasseri toward Ras Djibouti, a remote and deserted location. The ship was intentionally run aground, and its hull was damaged with stones and axes to simulate a wreck. Abdillahi gathered the crew to rehearse a fabricated story that blamed the shipwreck on bad weather. The fabricated version claimed that Lambert, afraid of the rough seas, attempted to escape on a raft with a servant and a sailor. The raft supposedly broke apart, resulting in their deaths. Survivors swam ashore while the Nasseri drifted to Ras Djibouti.

== Aftermath ==
=== Reactions to Lambert's death ===
Upon learning of Sharmarke's letter and Diny's testimony about the state of the Nasseri and the traces of blood, Aboubakr Pasha immediately concludes that Lambert was murdered. Unlike Sharmake, who didn't notify the authorities to avoid drawing attention to himself, Aboubakr Pasha, despite his usual lack of direct dealings with the British, alerts the Governor of Aden, acknowledging his role in regional policing. Aboubakr's letter to Brigadier Coghlan on June 7, 1859, reveals that Lambert had traveled to Al-Hodeydah with one of his boats but disappeared on his return journey from Mokha to Tadjoura. He mentions receiving a letter indicating that Lambert and his servant had died at sea near Djibouti, while the crew, including the captain, all natives of Zeila, had safely returned. Aboubeker requests an investigation into Lambert's death, emphasising that if it had occurred in his territory, he would have personally conducted the inquiry, but as it happened in Sharmarke's domain, he urges Coghlan to investigate with Saleh Chehem's assistance, focusing on the shipwreck site for clues.

=== Investigations led by France and Great Britain ===
The investigation into the death of Henri Lambert, a French Consular Agent, was conducted by Captain Playfair in June 1859 after Lambert died under suspicious circumstances while traveling aboard a ship, the Nasseri, from Aden to Tadjoura. The Furious was dispatched to investigate, and Playfair, alongside Captain Osborne, sailed to the region to gather information. Upon visiting Tadjoura and Zeila, Playfair spoke with local witnesses, including Aboubeker, who suspected foul play and pointed to a potential murder orchestrated by a man named Sharmarke. Playfair, however, did not give much weight to Aboubakr's claims and instead accepted a version of events presented by Assooah Gedy, a sailor from the Issa tribe. Gedy's account claimed that Lambert's death was a result of an accidental shipwreck caused by a violent storm and that Lambert, along with two others, drowned after being thrown off a raft. Despite evidence such as bloodstains on the shipwreck and signs of potential sabotage, Playfair maintained the death was accidental, downplaying the suspicious circumstances. Saleh Chehem, another important figure in the investigation, brought a letter from Sharmarke to Playfair, but he was not involved further in the investigation, and his presence was largely ignored. After the investigation, Playfair submitted his report to Brigadier Coghlan, emphasising the accidental nature of Lambert's death. This conclusion aligned with British political interests, as it helped avoid any diplomatic tensions with France. Despite skepticism from Coghlan, who privately questioned Playfair's findings, the British government backed Playfair's report to prevent the French from launching their own investigation. As a result, the cause of Lambert's death was officially deemed an accident, though doubts about the truth of the investigation persisted.

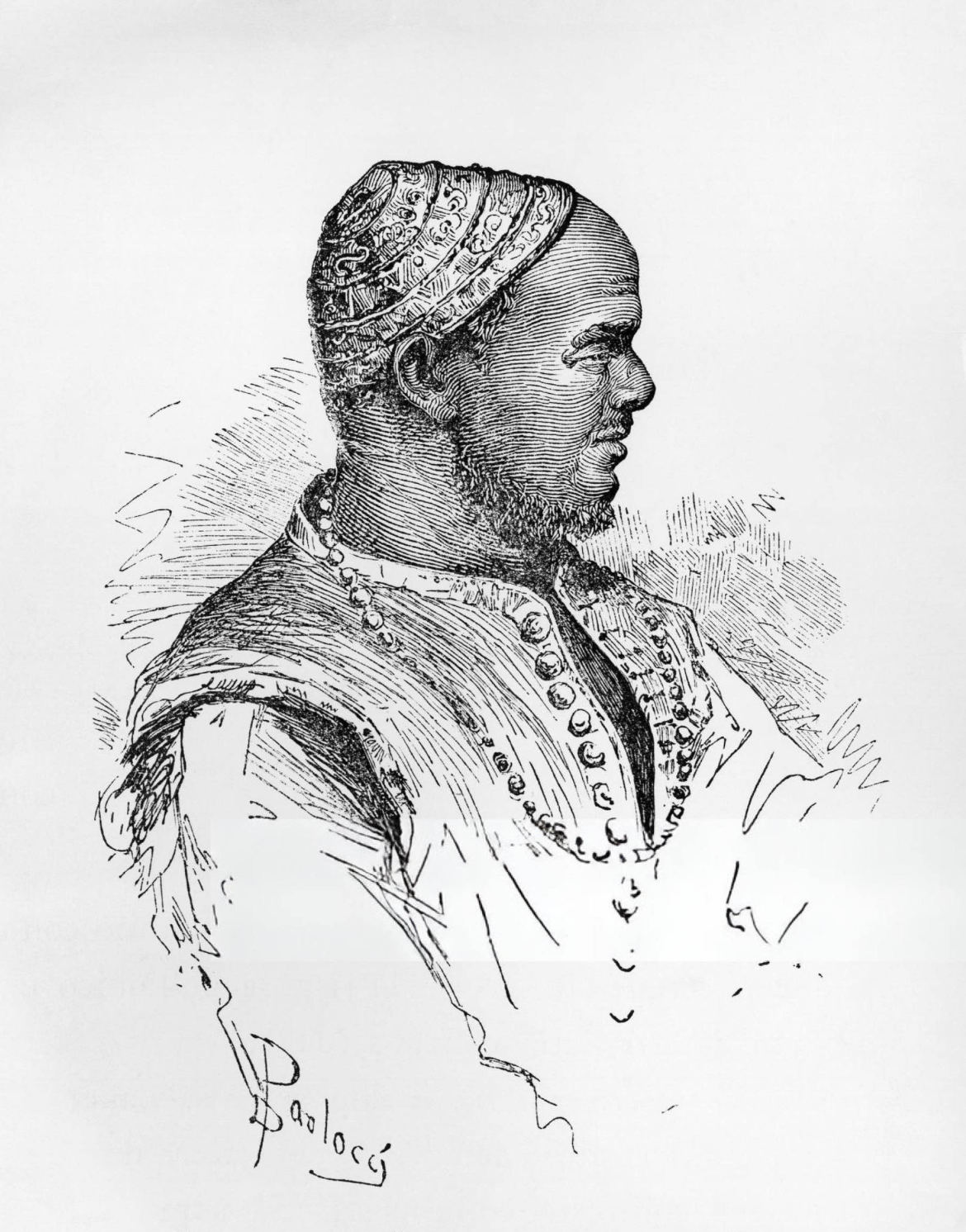
Drawing of Abu Bakr Pasha, governor of Zeila in 1877 by the Società Geografica Italiana.

Ahmed Pasha, complicit in the murder of Henri Lambert but concerned with maintaining appearances, sent two police officers (Cawas) to Zeila to investigate the incident. The first, Mahboub Cawas, was tasked with investigating the hijacking of a hay boat that Lambert had formally complained about. However, his role extended to the investigation of Lambert's death after being ordered by the Pasha. Mahboub, who had known Lambert since his time in Al-Hodeydah, initially advised Lambert to delay his departure, but Lambert refused. Mahboub eventually traveled to Zeila in June 1859, where he inspected the wreck of Lambert's boat, the Nasseri. He reported significant signs of foul play, such as intentional damage to the boat's hull and blood stains on the deck, which led him to conclude that Lambert had been murdered rather than dying in a shipwreck. He also discovered blood-soaked clothing, which he kept as evidence. Despite the grim findings, Mahboub's investigation ultimately stalled, with little further action taken. Lambert's belongings were retrieved later, and Mahboub continued to pursue the issue of the hay boat, although it appeared that he and others in authority did little to confront the truth of Lambert's murder. In a second investigation, Mahmoud Cawas, another officer, was sent to Zeila in July 1859 to bring back the crew and skipper of Lambert's boat. However, he faced resistance from Sharmarke, who claimed not to know the individuals involved, despite Mahboub having already identified them.

The investigation was hampered by these evasions, and Sharmarke went as far as hiding the crew by sending them to various locations. Mahmoud, weak-willed and unwilling to challenge Sharmarke's lies, followed orders to investigate further in Tadjoura. Meanwhile, Aboubeker, a local informant, confirmed that the crew was from Zeila, but by then, Sharmarke had already made efforts to cover up their whereabouts. The investigation failed to make any significant progress due to these obstructions, and despite knowing of Lambert's murder, authorities seemed unwilling to pursue the matter with urgency or clarity. The actions of the police in the investigation were marred by delays, misdirection, and complicity in the cover-up of Lambert's murder. Official reports were inconsistent, and no decisive action was taken by Ahmed Pasha, leading to frustration among those involved in the case. The lack of thorough investigation left many questions unanswered, with the true circumstances of Lambert's death obscured by the failure of local authorities to confront the reality of the crime. Mahmoud Cawas's investigation yielded no results, and Sharmake dismissed his efforts, advising him to return to Hodeida for further orders. Upon his return, Mahboub Cawas's health worsened, but after recovering, he handed over bloody remnants of Lambert's trousers, enraging Ahmed Pasha. In retaliation, the Pasha stripped Mahboub of his weapons and ordered his deportation. However, an officer intervened, and Mahboub was instead relieved of his duties and forced to leave Yemen, heading for Jeddah. Nacouda Abdillahi showed no remorse for killing Lambert, even wearing the ostrich feather of a victorious warrior. Shermarke protected him, moving the sailors out of Zeila when Mahmoud Cawas arrived. Abdillahi sought payment and safety, but Shermarke delayed, withholding the letter authorizing the murder. After handing over the contract, Abdillahi was sent to Al-Hodeydah, where Awadth warned him to stay silent. Abdillahi fled back to Zeila with a letter for Shermarke, who later seized it. Despite receiving some money from Shermarke, Abdillahi was left empty-handed, and months later, still confident of impunity, returned to Zeila.

The investigation into Henri Lambert's death began after multiple reports supported the theory of assassination. Alphonse Fleuriot de Langle's report, along with testimonies from Consuls Rousseau, Mahboub Cawas, and Gilbert, all confirmed suspicions that Lambert had been murdered. The French government took these reports seriously, and discussions were initiated about potential intervention. Plans were made to work with the Ottoman Empire to punish those responsible, possibly involving French naval forces. On July 13, 1860, Admiral Hamelin confirmed that Lambert had likely been murdered and requested guidance on reparations. Meanwhile, Joseph Lambert, the victim's brother, wrote to Napoleon III, citing the testimony of a cabin boy who had revealed key details about his brother's death, further pushing for action. However, inconsistencies arose in witness statements, particularly from Assooah Gedy, whose account of swimming distances and events surrounding the murder contradicted others, complicating the investigation.

The involvement of Father Juvenal in Aden, who had access to a freed cabin boy, added another layer of complexity, but legal hurdles and the passage of time made it difficult to use the boy's testimony officially. Despite this, Joseph Lambert's petition made clear the importance of the cabin boy's statement. The investigation faced challenges, such as conflicting reports from crew members, but the theory of assassination remained dominant. The French government moved forward with plans for a naval intervention and demands for reparations from the Ottoman Empire. The official inquiry, however, remained muddled by contradictory testimonies, but the pursuit of justice continued, leading to eventual diplomatic and military actions.

Following the death of Mr. Lambert, the French Consul Fleuriot de Langle launched a complex investigation into the matter. Playfair, was dispatched by the Ottoman authorities to gather information, and he returned with letters from Sharmarke and Aboubakr Pasha, both of which contradicted each other. These conflicting testimonies complicated the inquiry, as the claims from the people of Tadjoura were already known to be unreliable, especially since Shermarke had longstanding enemies in the region. Nonetheless, Fleuriot de Langle pushed forward with his investigation, placing significant emphasis on Aboubeker's testimonies, which, despite being inconsistent, suggested a connection between Sharmarke and the incident. In his communications with the Ottoman authorities, Fleuriot de Langle argued forcefully for Sharmarke's arrest and trial, warning that the failure to act could lead to the corruption of justice. He suggested sending the accused to Jeddah for trial, as it would be more impartial, given the conflicting testimonies. He also proposed that the trial be conducted in Constantinople, despite the rarity of such actions, if the local authorities doubted the validity of the accusations.

Ahmed Pasha, responded cautiously to Fleuriot de Langle's demands. While acknowledging the suspension of Sharmarke's command, he refrained from committing to a trial or further investigation. The Pasha questioned the validity of the evidence presented by the Tadjoura people, emphasising that their testimonies were contradictory and lacked corroboration. To maintain control over the situation, he suspended Shermarke's position and called for instructions from the Sublime Porte. At the same time, he took steps to neutralise any potential threats to his rule, including issuing orders to arrest

Sharmarke, Awadth bil Fukee, and the sailor Gely Gedy if they were found in Turkish ports. The Pasha's hesitation was a clear attempt to avoid direct confrontation with Fleuriot de Langle, while simultaneously justifying a potential military intervention against Zeila. This intervention would allow him to neutralise Aboubeker, his rival, and extend his control over the region. By maintaining this ambiguous stance, Ahmed Pasha avoided committing to a course of action that could jeopardise his position.

Despite his best efforts, Fleuriot de Langle found himself increasingly frustrated by the lack of cooperation from the Ottoman authorities. The Pasha's evasiveness and refusal to take concrete action confirmed his suspicion that the Ottoman Empire was not interested in conducting a fair trial. In his report to his superiors on April 15, 1861, he conceded the failure of his diplomatic efforts, stating bluntly, "The Pasha does not want a trial." This admission marked the end of Fleuriot de Langle's hopes for a resolution through diplomatic channels. Realising that the Ottoman authorities would not act, Fleuriot de Langle decided to take matters into his own hands. He planned a trip to Zeila to gather more evidence and confront the situation directly. However, without the promised military support, such as the Cordelière and the 400 Turkish soldiers, his task became even more challenging. He proceeded alone, driven by a growing sense of disillusionment, as it became increasingly clear that the political landscape in the region was not conducive to justice.

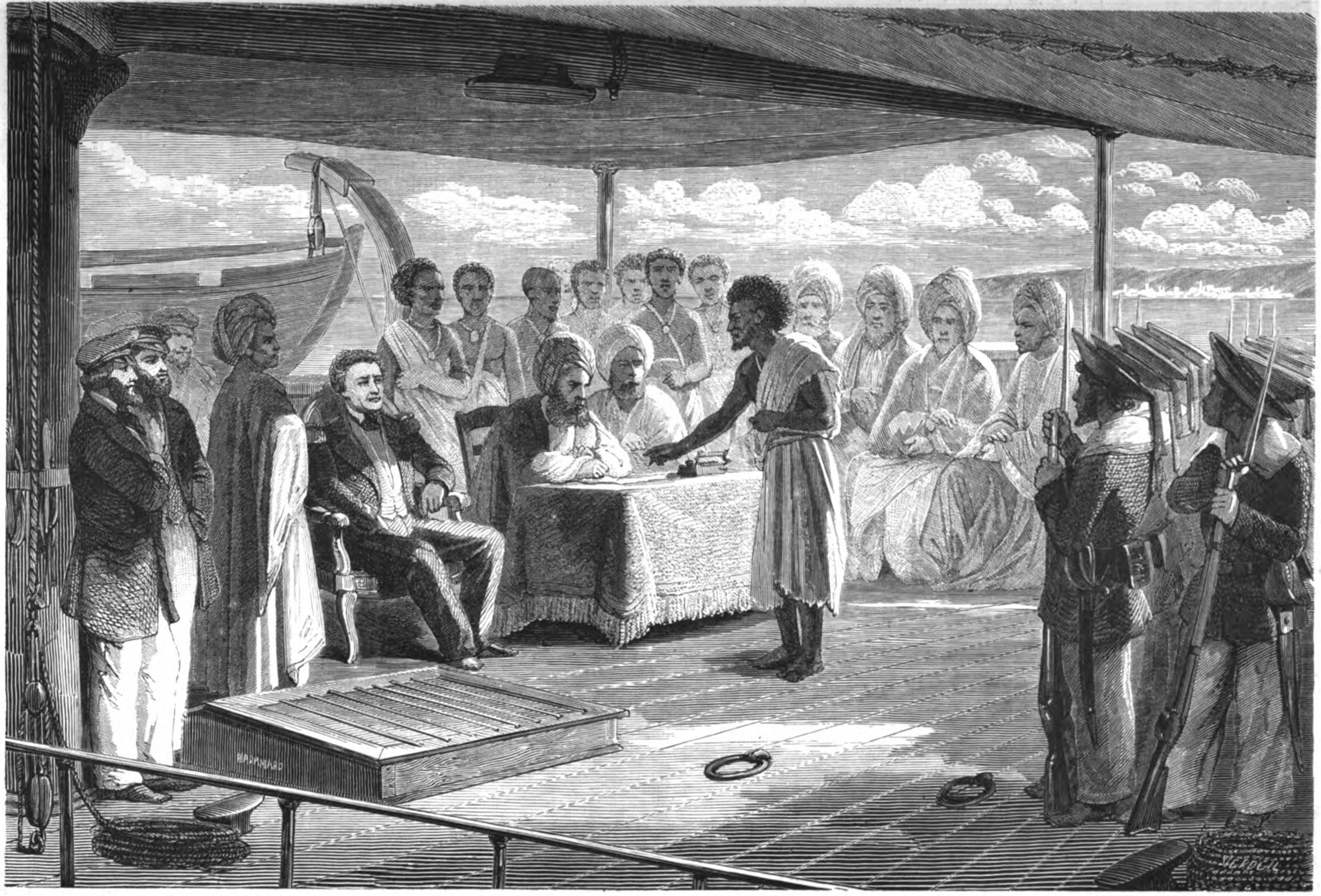
Deposition of Abdul Ahy before the Qadi of Zeila and the Ughaz of the Issa and Commander Fleuriot de Langle, engraving published in Le Tour du monde in 1862

On April 4, 1861, Fleuriot de Langle anchored the Somme at Tadjoura, where he gathered key testimonies, including second-hand but valuable information from Aboubeker about Lambert's murder. He detailed Shermarke's role in orchestrating the crime, the events on the Nasseri, and the subsequent involvement of various actors. De Langle emphasised the impossibility of certain alleged events, such as building a raft aboard the Nasseri, and revealed critical testimonies, including Nacouda of the Aitaitoo witnessing the Nasseri leaving Mussah Islands after 4 p.m. Sharmarke's connection was further established when he gave Lambert's office to Dunjee, a Banian merchant, to grow his fortune. De Langle also encountered Mohamed Aberrahman in Tadjoura, who provided corroborative details, including traces of blood and confessions from sailors.

In Siyara, De Langle failed to collect valid testimonies. Nacouda Haj Ali and Samantar Robly had only transported families of Sharmarke's clan, who were fleeing the French. However, Samantar Sheroua eventually confessed, detailing Shermarke's letter to Awadh el Fakil and the sailors' behavior following Lambert's murder. The Somme anchored off Zeila on April 7, where initial contacts with the city were amicable. De Langle offered financial rewards for testimonies and issued safe-conducts to facilitate cooperation. However, opposition arose, prompting him to issue a formal summons to the inhabitants. The summons demanded the surrender of key witnesses and crew members of the Nasseri, under threat of severe punitive measures. During Ramadan, hostages were delivered, and investigations revealed significant information, including confessions implicating Shermarke and details of the sailors' behavior following Lambert's murder. However, De Langle's progress was hindered by the interference of Omar, a Turkish officer suspected of being the Pasha's secret agent.

On April 16, 1861, the Somme arrived at Aden. De Langle's activities in the Red Sea had drawn the attention of Captain Playfair, who dispatched H.M.S. Lady Canning for surveillance. De Langle informed Playfair via his chief of staff, Lieutenant Paqué, that he intended to return to Zeila with the Cordelière to arrest the remaining crew of the Nasseri. His haste allowed only limited communication with Playfair, who became suspicious of De Langle's mission. Playfair promptly sent his intelligence agent, Hassan Ali Rejib, to Hodeida on a fact-finding mission regarding De Langle's actions. Meanwhile, De Langle, now joined by the Cordelière, departed for Zeila on April 17, continuing his pursuit of justice for Lambert's murder.

== Consequences ==
=== Overthrow of Sayyid Mohammed Al-Barr ===
On April 18, the two French ships anchored in front of Zeila, where Fleuriot de Langle faced resistance. Sayyid Mohammed, the Provisional Governor, betrayed de Langle by obstructing the surrender of the ex-sailors of the Natchery. However, local notables captured him and handed him over to de Langle, who kept him and four accomplices as hostages. Aly Sanguely, a passive participant who witnessed Lambert's murder, and Darrana, cousin of Abdillahi bin Shaheem, were also delivered to de Langle. The remaining hostages were released. The notables proposed Aboubakr Pasha as Provisional Governor. In a secret meeting with de Langle, Aboubeker requested ratification of prior negotiations with France regarding territorial occupation. He also clarified the origins of Tadjoura's customs payments to Zeila, tracing them back to agreements under Yemeni Imams and later Turkish oversight. Aly Sanguely's testimony confirmed Lambert's murder, while Darrana detailed Abdillahi's conflicts with Shermarke, the rental of the dhow, and the violent measures Shermarke used to recover incriminating documents.

=== Confessions to the crime and subsequent trials at Constantinople ===
De Langle, dependent on Playfair's cooperation, requested the arrest of Shermarke's secretary, Hadj Osman, who had moved to Aden. On April 24, 1861, de Langle asked Playfair to detain Osman and facilitate his interrogation. Though Playfair had questioned Osman the day before, he found no evidence linking him to Lambert's death, but Osman denied any knowledge of it and dismissed the claims as bribery. De Langle, dissatisfied with the initial deposition, pressed Playfair to ensure Osman's arrest. Playfair responded by confirming Osman's flight but later reported that he had captured him. Osman was brought aboard the Somme on April 28, 1861, where he admitted that the letter urging Lambert's murder existed, though he claimed it was written by Salmis, a slave of Sharmarke. Osman provided details of the letter's contents and confirmed prior contact between Sharmarke and Abdillahi. However, de Langle's confusion about the testimony arose when Osman contradicted his earlier statements.

On June 7, 1861, the Somme anchored near Zeila, where Abdillahi, the Nacouda of Nasseri, was surrounded by a delegation from the Issa Tribe. The commander, De Langle, honored his promise to release Abdillahi following his confession. On June 8, Abdillahi openly confessed to his involvement in the murder of Mr. Henri Lambert, explaining that he was coerced into the crime by emissaries from Sharmarket and threats to his life. Abdillahi detailed how he and his crew, after receiving orders from Sharmarket through emissaries Aly Bar and Mohamed Hassan Robly, set out to kill Lambert. Despite his initial reluctance, Abdillahi was eventually seduced by the promise of money and protection, ultimately leading to the murder of Lambert. After the crime, Abdillahi confessed to the killings of Lambert's two servants, an Abyssinian named Balassa and a black boy named Tama, fearing their potential revelations.

In a confrontation, Abdillahi's story was corroborated by the emissaries and the crew. Aouat Bel Fakil, another accomplice, also confessed to his role in the crime, revealing the broader involvement of higher authorities, including Sharmarke and Ahmed Pasha. De Langle, having kept his word, released Abdillahi, though he warned him against future harm to the French. Abdillahi's confession, as well as the confirmation of other witnesses, was sent to Ahmed Pasha, and De Langle voiced suspicions of Turkish interference in the investigation. Despite the tensions, De Langle's actions earned him the respect of the Somali tribes, who viewed him as honourable. The Somme then departed for Reunion, with De Langle reporting to the French Ministry, expressing concerns over the British influence and the potential manipulation of the investigation by the Turkish administration.

Upon their arrival in Al-Hodeydah, Abdul Ahy and his crew were joined by a boat from Zeila. This boat, commanded by Samanta Sheroua, carried two emissaries from Sharmarket, Aly Bar Omar Tour and Mohamed Hassan Robly, who were tasked with delivering a letter demanding the death of Lambert. Aouat Bel Fakil, an ex-banker of Sharmarke, received the letter and sent it to Ahmed Pasha, who consented to the execution. Awadh then revealed to Abdul Ahy his role in the plan.

The emissaries attempted to sway Abdul Ahy through promises and threats. Initially resisting, Abdul Ahy eventually gave in due to the fear of death and the promises of impunity and reward, including a written order that would ensure his protection if the crime were ever investigated. This document, bearing the seal of Sharmake, was presented to Abdul Ahy, securing the support of his crew. Abdul Ahy and his crew carried out the murder of Lambert and his two servants, Balassa and Tama, who had tried to assist Lambert. After killing the servants and throwing their bodies overboard, the crew scuttled the boat. They informed Sharmarke that the task was complete, and Lambert was dead. Abdul Ahy, however, viewed himself as an instrument of the pasha, coerced into committing the crime under the threat of death. His confession, alongside corroborations from the emissaries and the captain Samanta Sheroua, detailed the events, with the blame placed squarely on Sharmarke and Ahmed Pasha. The guilty parties were eventually taken to Constantinople, where they were to answer for their crime before the Ottoman authorities. Among those tried were Awadh Bel Fakil, Mohamed Hassan Robly, Hadj Osman, sailors Gely Gedy and Aly Sanguely, and cabin boy Mahomet. They were accompanied by Samanta Sheroua as a witness for the prosecution. Three sailors from the Nasseri escaped prosecution, and a fourth, Assoah Gedy, who had disclosed the sinking details to the English vice-governor, had died at Zeila before the arrival of the commander.

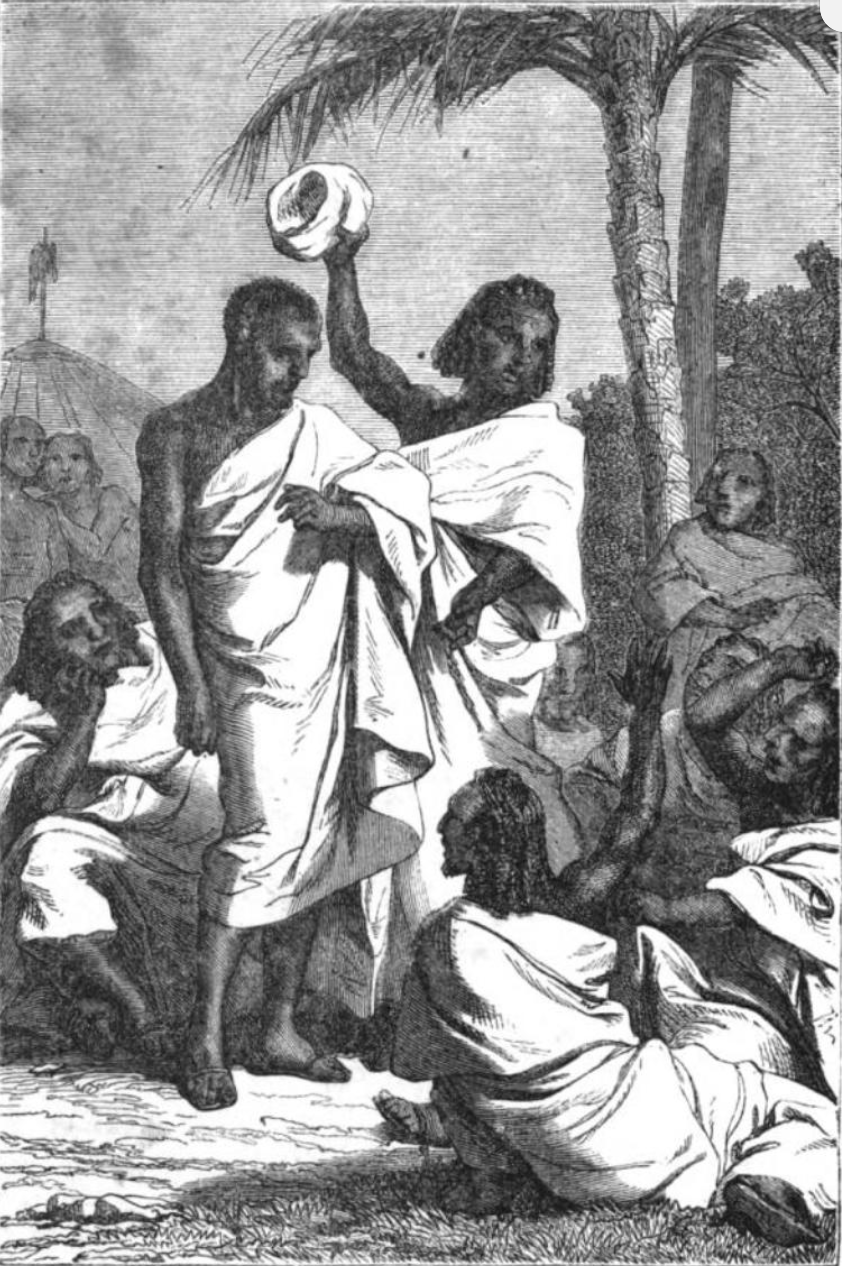
One day, in the middle of an assembly, the Ughaz Robleh's hair was shaven off; he was thus dethroned by his subjects.

As for the fate of the conspirators, Sharmarke was the first to meet his end. He died of an aneurysm aboard the Somme while in Jeddah. Before his death, feeling immense guilt, he expressed his desire to wear European clothes, a gesture symbolising his renouncement of the Turkish and Arab ways in acknowledgment of his wrongdoing. The others met tragic ends: Feredj, Sharmarke's secretary, died of phthisis on Reunion Island; Aly Bar Omar Tour succumbed to illness at sea; El Téré, the sailor who had revealed the full truth, also died of galloping phthisis in Brest. In Constantinople, the remaining conspirators faced justice under the Ottoman authorities. Awadh Bel Fakil, Mohamed Hassan Robly, and others were sentenced for their roles in the crime, their fates sealed by the weight of their actions.

=== Ughaz Robleh's dethronement ===
The Somalis were a turbulent people as they had adopted universal suffrage, and pushed it to its ultimate consequences. The Issa Somalis had a chief, the Ughaz Robleh, who had exchanged letters from Rear-Admiral De Langle. Although, these letters later became useless, Robleh was no longer an Ughaz. Due to the fact, it had not rained for a long time; people began to say that it was he who had brought this punishment from Heaven by delivering the murderers of Henri Lambert to France, and one day, in the middle of an assembly, his hair was shaven clean: it is by ceremonies like this, the Issa Somali depose their chiefs. Robleh, whose lofty character the Rear-Admiral had noticed, took the matter philosophically, he let his hair grow, and here he is, as Bedouin as before. According to the laws of the Issa, the Ughaz's position is jeopardised if he is perceived as powerless to bring rain during severe droughts.

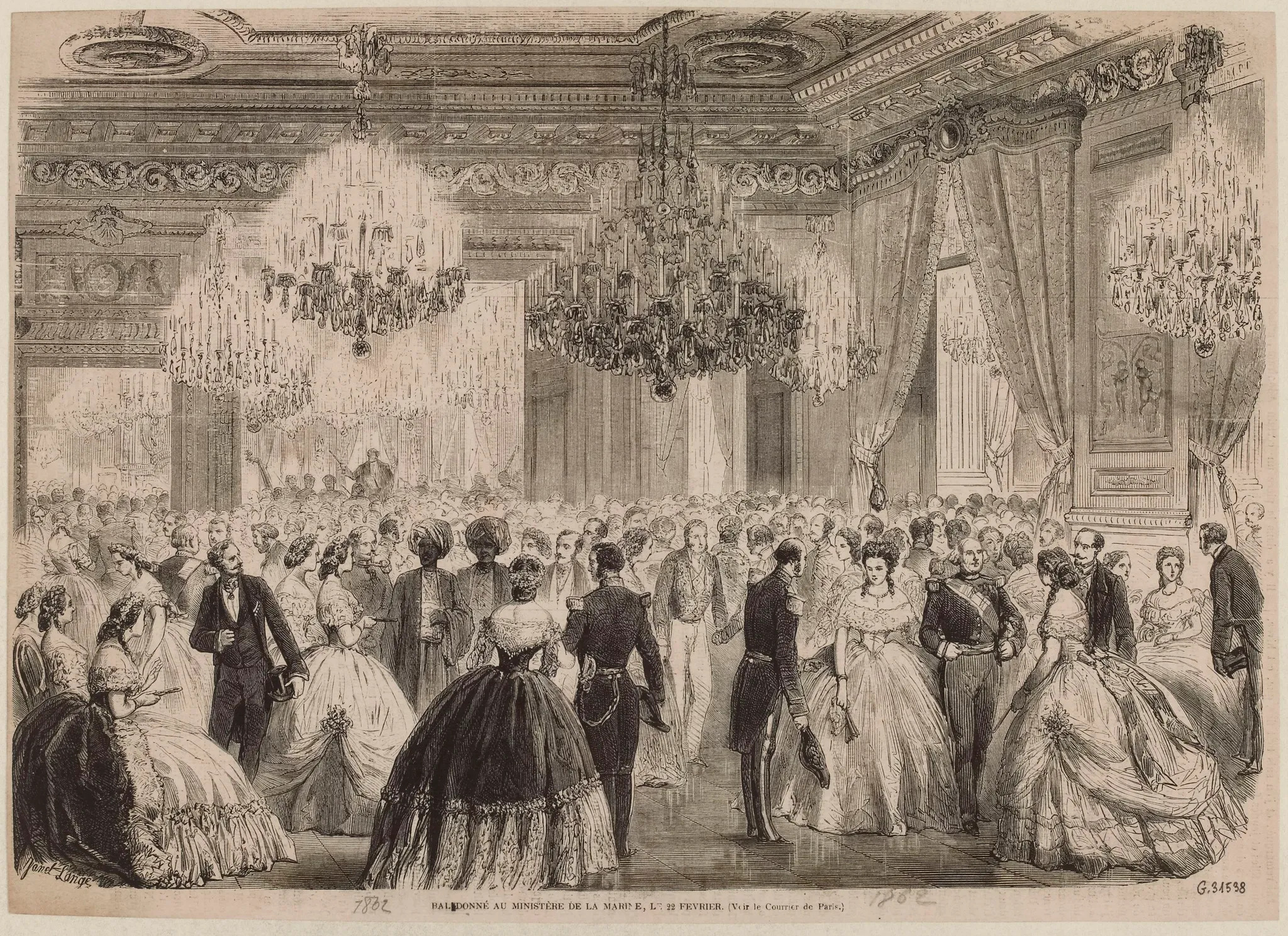
Diny Ahmed Aboubaker and his interpreter Ismael meet with Napoleon III in Paris at the ball given within the Ministry of the Navy on February 22 1862.

=== Colonial implications regarding Henri Lambert's murder ===
Henri Lambert's death in 1859 had far-reaching consequences, both in France and the Horn of Africa, drawing attention to the strategic importance of establishing a French presence near the Red Sea. The events surrounding Lambert's death and the subsequent French involvement in the region challenged longstanding assumptions in both France and the Horn of Africa. In France, it dispelled the belief that competing with Britain for influence in the Red Sea was futile. In the Horn of Africa, it undermined the entrenched perception of British supremacy, notably exemplified by Sharmarke's reference to France as "The Lord of the Sea."

Lambert's efforts paved the way for the eventual cession of Obock to France, a significant step towards expanding French influence in the region. This culminated on 11 March 1862, when Diny Ahmed Aboubekr, cousin of Aboubakr Pasha, signed the Treaty of Obock in Paris, formally ceding the territory to France. Diny and Ismail, who had accompanied Joseph Lambert to Paris, played a pivotal role in this diplomatic shift. Both men had been loyal friends to Henri Lambert, and their time in Paris, from November 1861 to March 1862, highlighting the personal ties France had cultivated with local figures in the Horn of Africa. Diny, despite his rough appearance from a raid by the Danakil bedouins of the interior while guiding Charles-Xavier Rochet d'Héricourt's expedition to Abyssinia. He bought a pair of boots, a pair of trousers and a cloth pea coat. He had only kept his red belt around his waist and his enormous cashmere turban, which developed his immense orbs around his shaved head. He never went out without holding his amber rosary in his hand and under his arm a gigantic parasol that he had hastened to buy as an indispensable adornment. Dini had received a Turkish sabre from the French Emperor Napoleon III, with an ivory handle; He was happy to show it to all his visitors.

Their presence in Paris marked the zenith of French diplomacy in the Horn of Africa. They attended the French Navy ball in February 1862, where their exotic appearance and composed demeanour caught the attention of the French elite. The signing of the Treaty of Obock, which formalised the French acquisition of the region, marked a pivotal moment in the growing French presence in East Africa. However, the subsequent neglect of local allies, such as Aboubakr, who sought refuge in Tadjoura in 1864, strained relations with the very figures who had helped France establish its foothold in the region. Despite early setbacks, France's continued engagement in the region was solidified through later treaties, including the 1884 agreement. Governor Lagarde's decision to transfer the colonial administration to Djibouti laid the foundation for what would later become French Somaliland. Yet, this expansion was not without its challenges. The growth of Italian and British interests in the region during the Scramble for Africa, particularly Italy's ambitions in Eritrea and Somalia, would continue to threaten France's position in the Horn of Africa.
