= Obock Territory =

Administrative colony belonging to the Second French colonial empire

Obock Territory Territoire d'Obock (French)
- 1862–1896
- Flag Coat of arms
- Anthem: "Partant pour la Syrie" (de facto) "Departing for Syria"
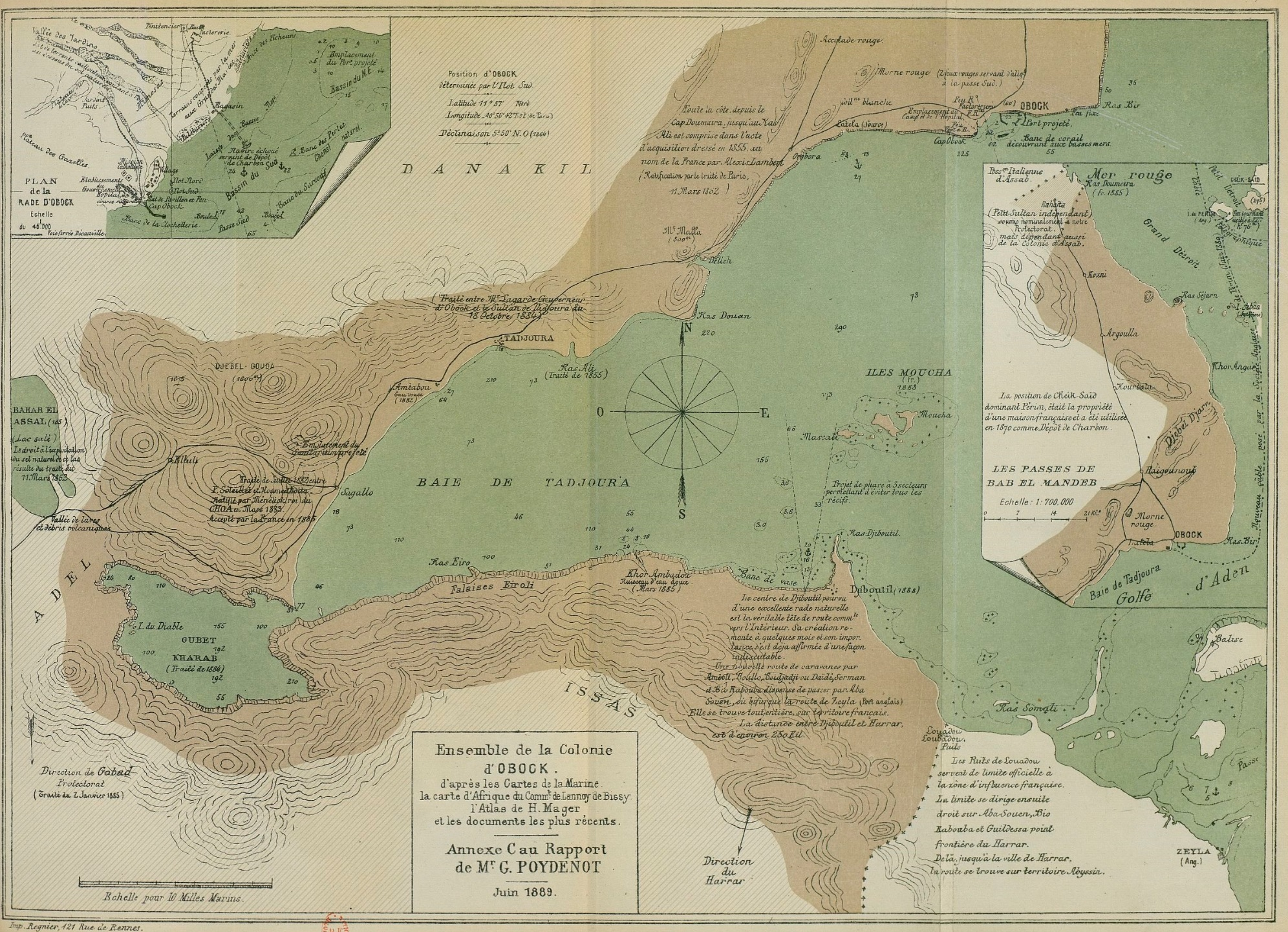
- Map of the Obock Territory and Dependencies drawn c.1889
- Status: French colony
- Capital: Obock
- Official languages: French
- Common languages: Afar; Arabic; Somali
- Religion: Islam; Christianity
- History
  - Established: 1862
  - Disestablished: 1896
- Currency: French franc
Succeeded by
French Somaliland
- Today part of: Djibouti

The Obock Territory and Dependencies (French: Territoire d'Obock) was an administrative colony belonging to the Second French colonial empire, between 1862 and 1896, located in the current republic of Djibouti.

== History ==
On June 4, 1859, the former French consular agent in Aden, Henri Lambert, was assassinated in the Gulf of Tadjourah. After an investigation by the French envoy Stanislas Russel, the commander of the naval station of the East Coast of Africa (based in Réunion Island), Viscount Alphonse Fleuriot de Langle, was tasked with arresting the presumed culprits. They were handed over to the Ottoman authorities. On March 11, 1862, representatives of the sultan of Tadjourah (Diny Ahmed Aboubekr, Mohammed Hammed, and Aboubekr Ibrahim Chehem), who had come to Paris following this incident, concluded an agreement with Édouard Thouvenel, Foreign Minister of Napoleon III, by which they ceded to France “the ports, harbor, and anchorage of Obock located near Cape Ras Bir along with the plain extending from Ras Aly in the south to Ras Doumeira in the north”. France purchased this right for the sum of 10,000 thalers (55,000 gold francs), which were paid in May 1862. On this occasion, the official takeover of Obock was made by Capitaine de frégate Buret [Frigate Captain] of the Curieux, who noted in his report to the Minister of the Navy that he was convinced that if the inhabitants of this coast desired the French presence,

it was because they were persuaded that we were indifferent to the slave trade and that we would allow their boats to fly the French flag to cover their illicit trade.

However, the area remained unoccupied for almost twenty years. Only a few traders began settling there in 1881. It wasn't until late 1883 that an official mission was sent to explore the territory under the command of Commander Conneau of the Infernet, accompanied by Léonce Lagarde. Lagarde, who arrived in Obock on August 4, 1884, became the first “commander” of the territory. He began to expand the colony to encompass the entire Gulf of Tadjoura, which became the “Territory of Obock and Dependencies.”

Around 1895, Lagarde moved the colonial administration center from Obock to the city of Djibouti, on the other side of the gulf. The Messageries Maritimes also moved their stopover there in November 1895. The territories were administratively merged into the French Somaliland on May 20, 1896.

== Philately ==
Until 1892, the colony of Obock used postage stamps from the French colonial empire featuring the Alphée Dubois type of 1881. In 1892, these stamps were surcharged with the word "OBOCK". Later that year, some of these stamps were additionally surcharged with values ranging from 1 centime to 5 francs, and stamps of the Group type were also issued.

The stamps issued in 1893 and 1894 stand out: they are a series of imperforate stamps with a serrated line printed between them, imitating perforation. Additionally, the 2-franc and higher-value stamps were in the shape of an equilateral triangle featuring a depiction of a méhariste (camel rider), while some stamps were also shaped like diamonds, signed by Sauniers. The word "Obock" was inscribed in Latin, Arabic, and Ge'ez scripts. Due to the closure of the post office in Obock in 1894, the remaining stock of stamps was used until depleted in Djibouti. Some stamps were bisected to create lower denominations. In 1902, part of the stock was sold with small values surcharged. It was the Obock stamps surcharged with "DJ" or "Djibouti" that served as the first stamps of the French protectorate in Djibouti. The stamps used afterward in Obock were those of the French Somaliland region, like those used in Djibouti.

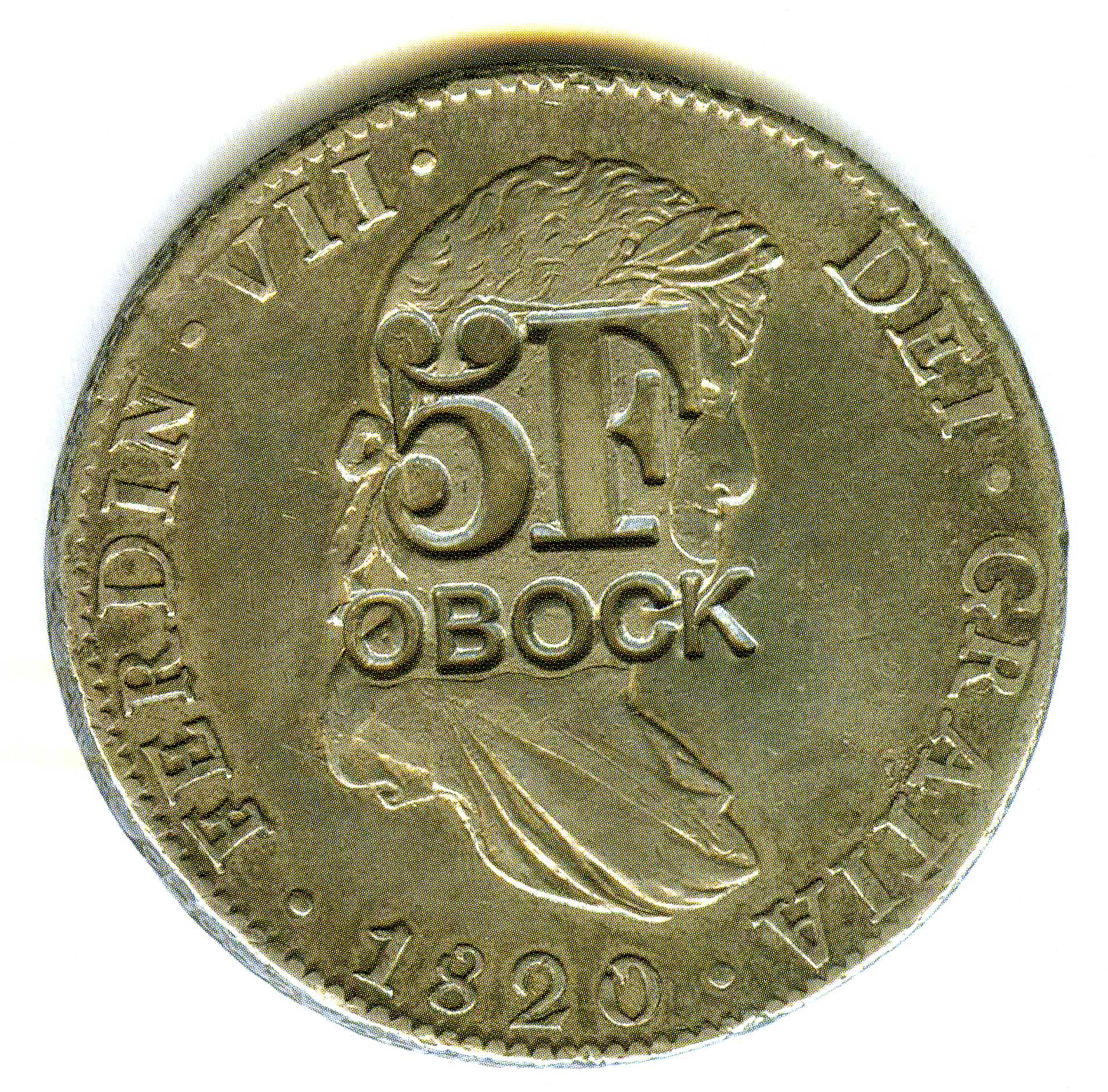
Spanish 8 real coin (1820) countermarked “5 f[rancs] Obock” during the early days of the French presence in the region (1880s).

== Bibliography ==
- L. Faurot, Dans l'île de Kamarane: observations ethnographiques; Sur les Danakils du golfe de Tadjoura: observations ethnographiques; Note sur les tumuli du territoire d'Obock, Paris: E. Leroux, 1887. OCLC 21434083
