= Tadjoura =

Tadjoura Tagórri تاجورة Tajuura
- Town
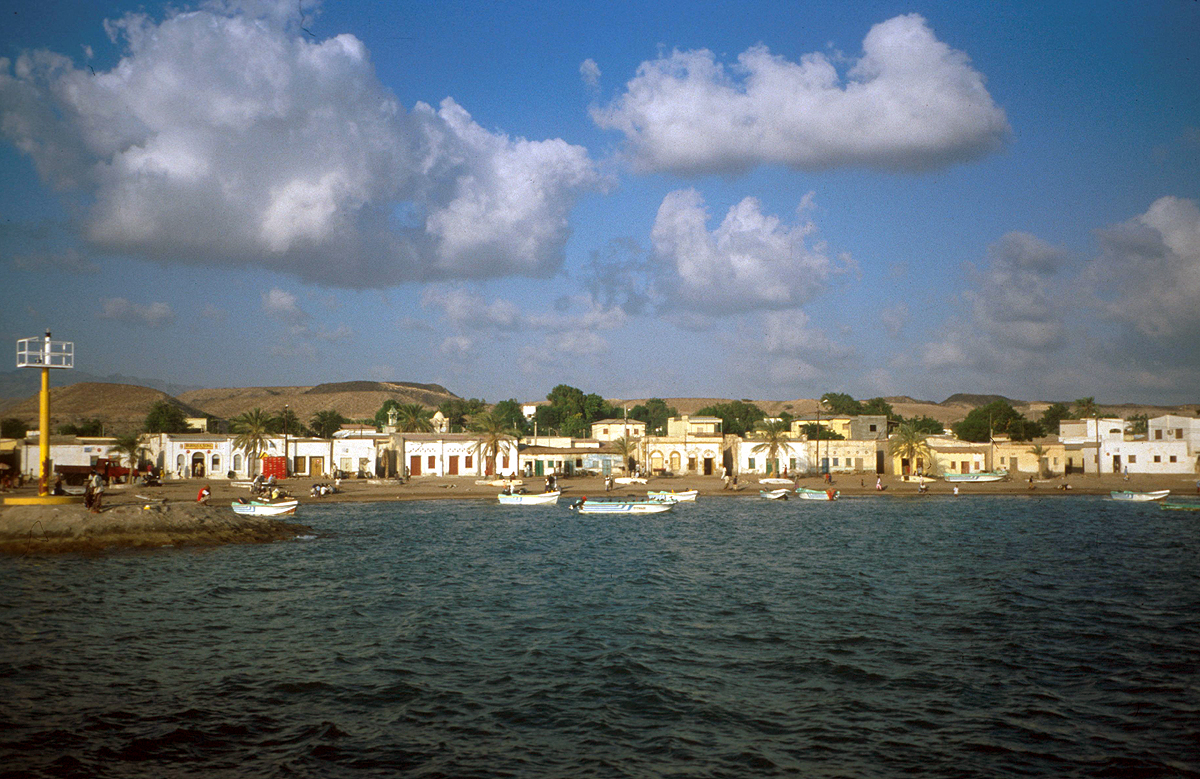
- The port of Tadjoura in Djibouti

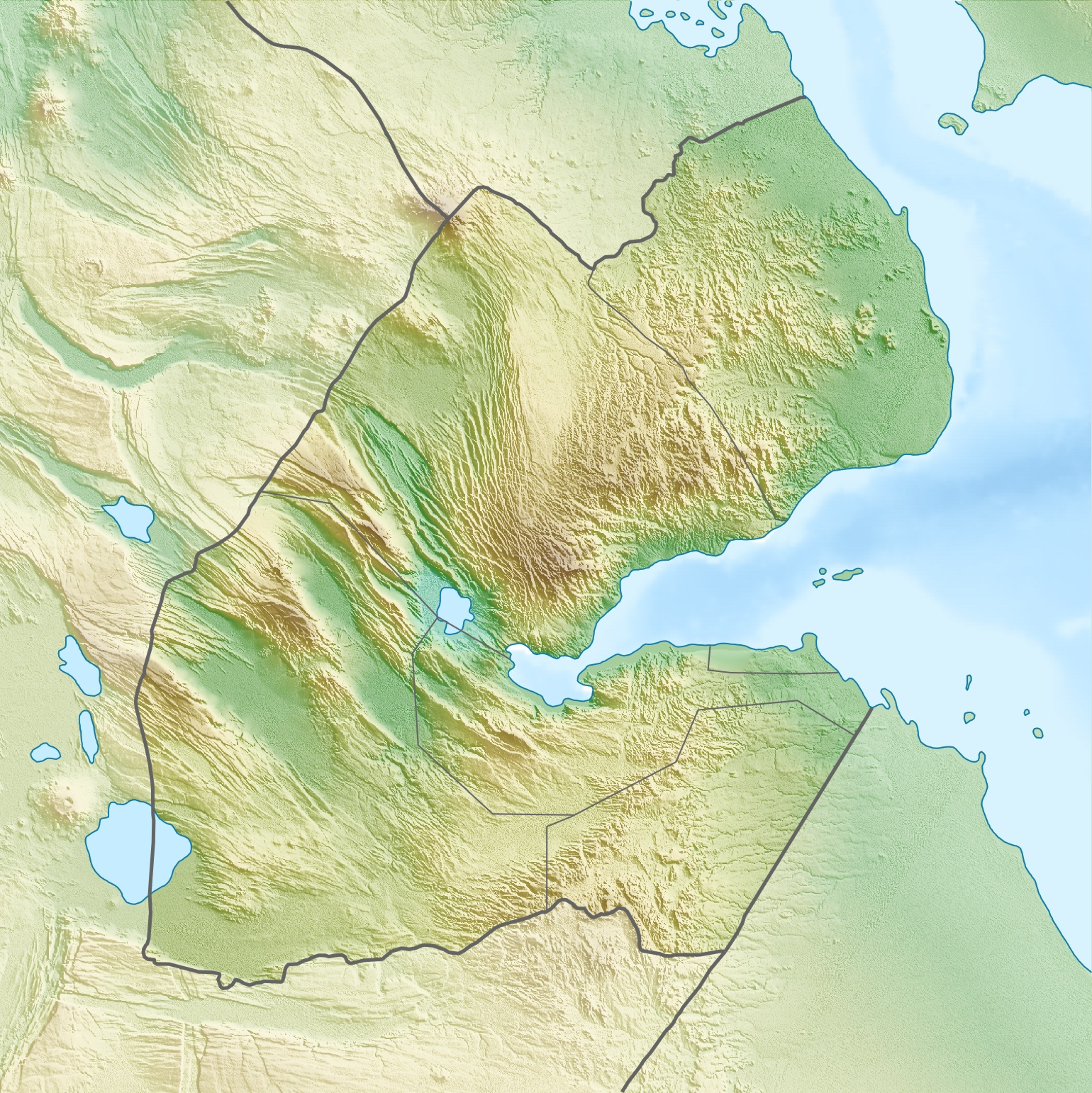
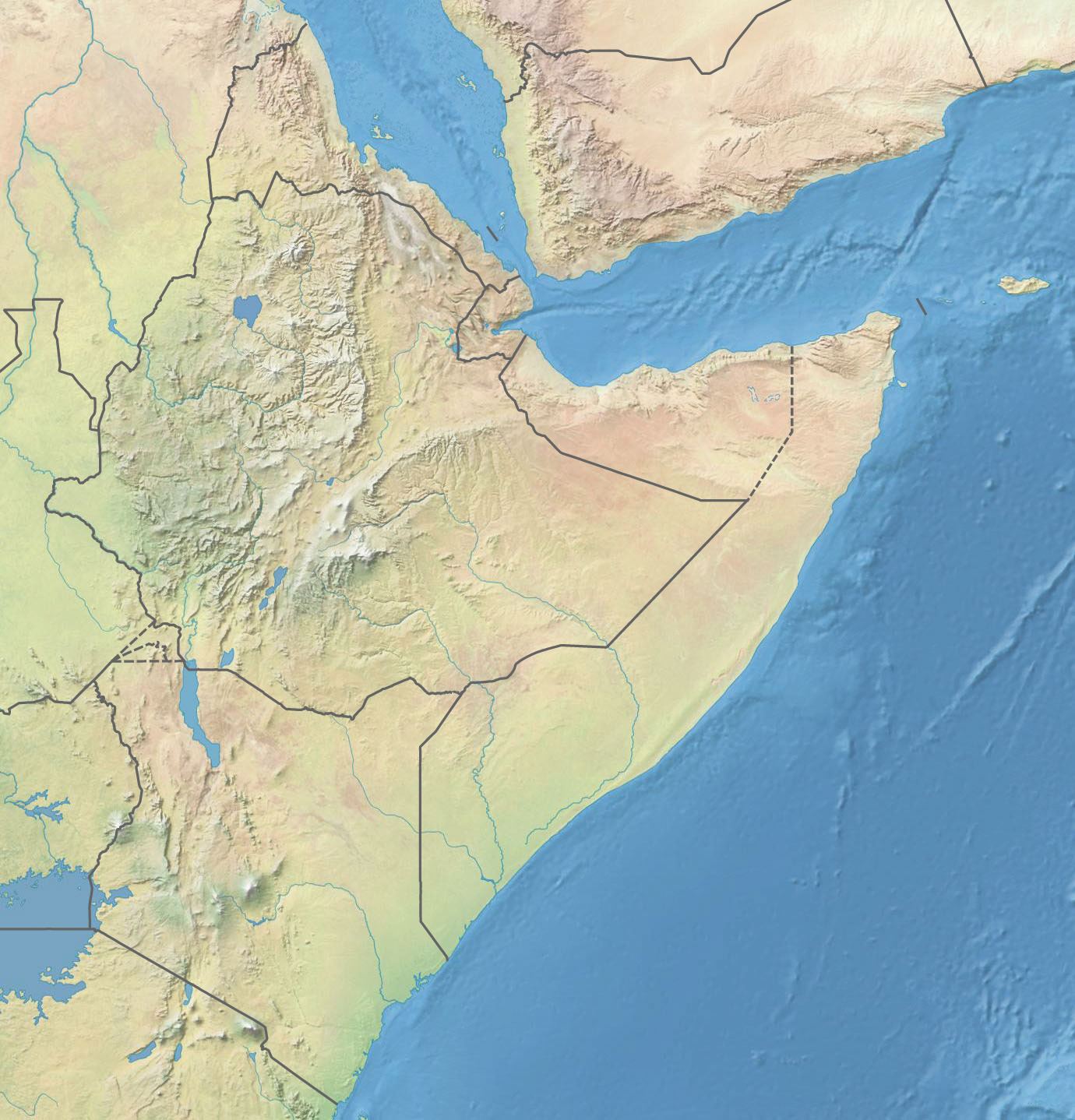
- Location within Djibouti Location within the Horn of Africa Location within Africa
- Coordinates: 11°47′N 42°53′E
- Country: Djibouti
- Region: Tadjoura

Area
  - Total: 7.356 km^{2} (2.840 sq mi)
- Elevation: 4 m (13 ft)

Population (2024 Census)
  - Total: 18,808
  - Density: 2,557/km^{2} (6,622/sq mi)

Tadjoura (Afar: Tagórri; Arabic: تاجوراء, romanized: Tajūrā’; Somali: Tajuura) is one of the oldest towns in Djibouti and the capital of the Tadjourah Region. The town rose to prominence in the early 19th century as an alternative trading port to nearby Zeila. Lying on the Gulf of Tadjoura, it is home to a population of around 19,000 inhabitants. It is the third-largest city in the country after Djibouti and Ali Sabieh.

Tadjoura has an airstrip and is linked by ferry with Djibouti City. It is also known for its whitewashed buildings and nearby beaches, along with its mosques.

== Etymology ==
The Afar name Tagórri derives from the noun tágor or tógor, (pl. tágar meaning "outre à puiser" ("goatskin flask for drawing water"). The name Tagórri is specifically derived from *tagór-li, which means "qui a des outre à puiser" ("that which has goatskin flasks to draw water"), in effect meaning "abondante en eau" ("abundant with water").

== History ==
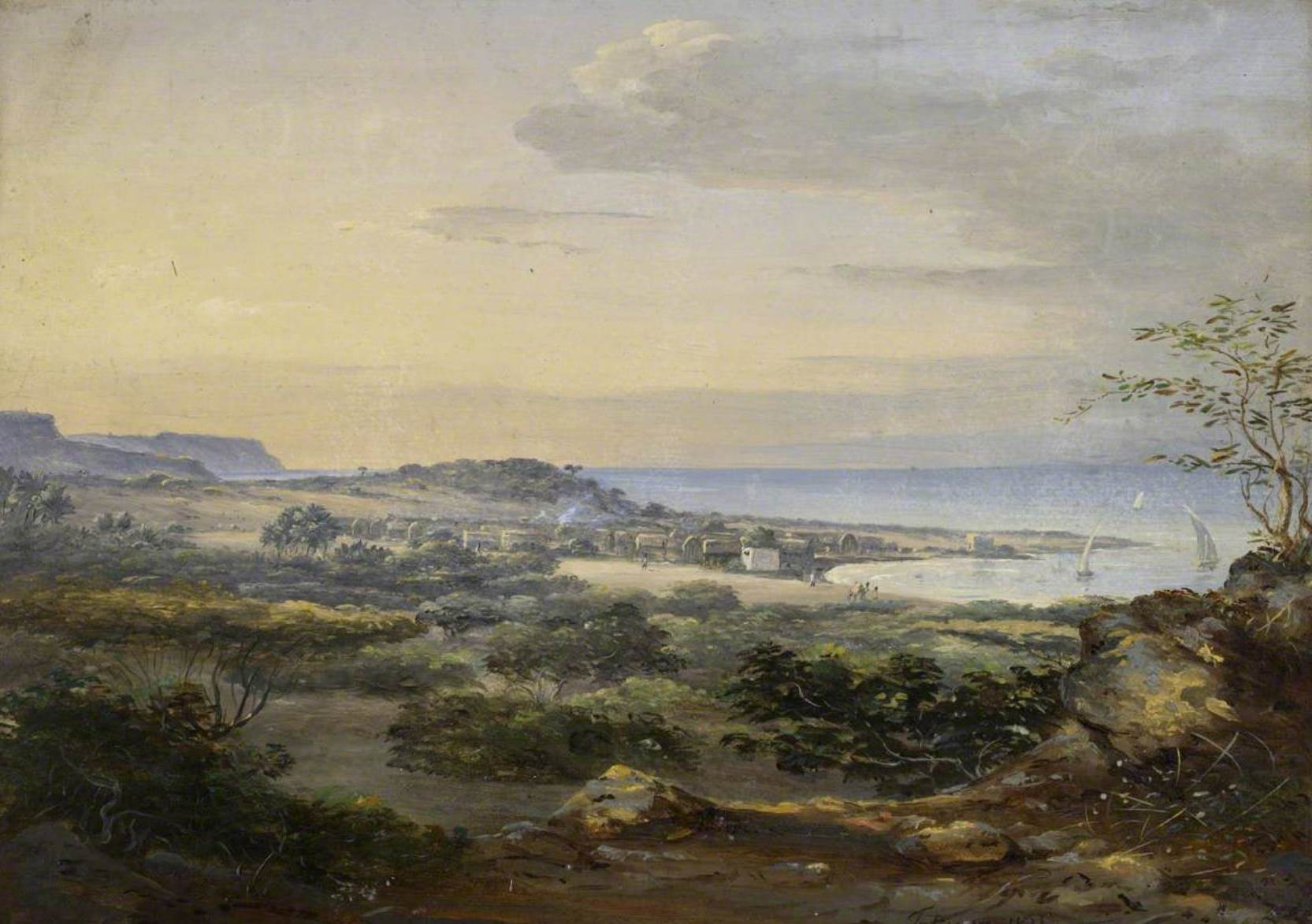
Drawing landscape of Tadjoura in 1841 by Johann Martin Bernatz.

The emergence of Tadjoura occurred following the rise of the Adoimara or "white house" of the Afar people who inhabited the southern part of the Danakil country and were allied to the rulers of Shewa. In 1810 they defeated their rivals, the Asa-yamara or "red house" of the Afar, which opened the way for the development of the port and the Ethiopian interior. Tadjoura then became the seat of an Afar sultan known as the Dardar, who "claimed authority over all of the northern Adoimara Afar to the borders of Showa. However, although it was true that some sub-clans of the Adoimara roamed as far as the borders of Ifat, even the staunchest supporters of the Sultan agreed that his actual authority did not stretch beyond Lake Assal, a short distance from Tadjoura."

Richard Pankhurst notes that it differed from neighboring ports by handling almost entirely the trade of Shewa and Aussa, "rather than that of Harar or the Ogaden." He quotes William Cornwallis Harris' description of an annual bazaar that started each September, when "for two months the beach is piled with merchandise, and the suburbs are crowded with camels, mules and donkeys." Pankhurst also cites C.T. Beke that the trade with the inhabitants of the Afar Depression was handled entirely by women, "who loaded the camels, bought and sold while the men kept away altogether 'to avoid bloodshed, this country being the scene of constant feuds among the different tribes.'" While Abir observes that the port is not mentioned in all of the material about the Red Sea in the eighteenth or early nineteenth centuries, by the mid-19th century Tadjoura was thriving, "while all the other so-called Afar sultanates along the coast were described ... as small decaying villages of no political or commercial importance." Tadjoura owed this success to possessing a major slave market; Pankhurst suggests that a rough estimate of 6,000 people a year left Ethiopia through Tadjoura and Zeila. The other important commodity sold in Tadjoura in the 19th century was ivory, brought by caravans from Aliyu Amba. Other goods exported included wheat, durra, honey, gold, ostrich feathers, senna, madder, and civetone. The value of trade in 1880-1 was estimated at the time as 29,656 rupees in exports and 18,513 rupees in imports.

=== French Somaliland ===
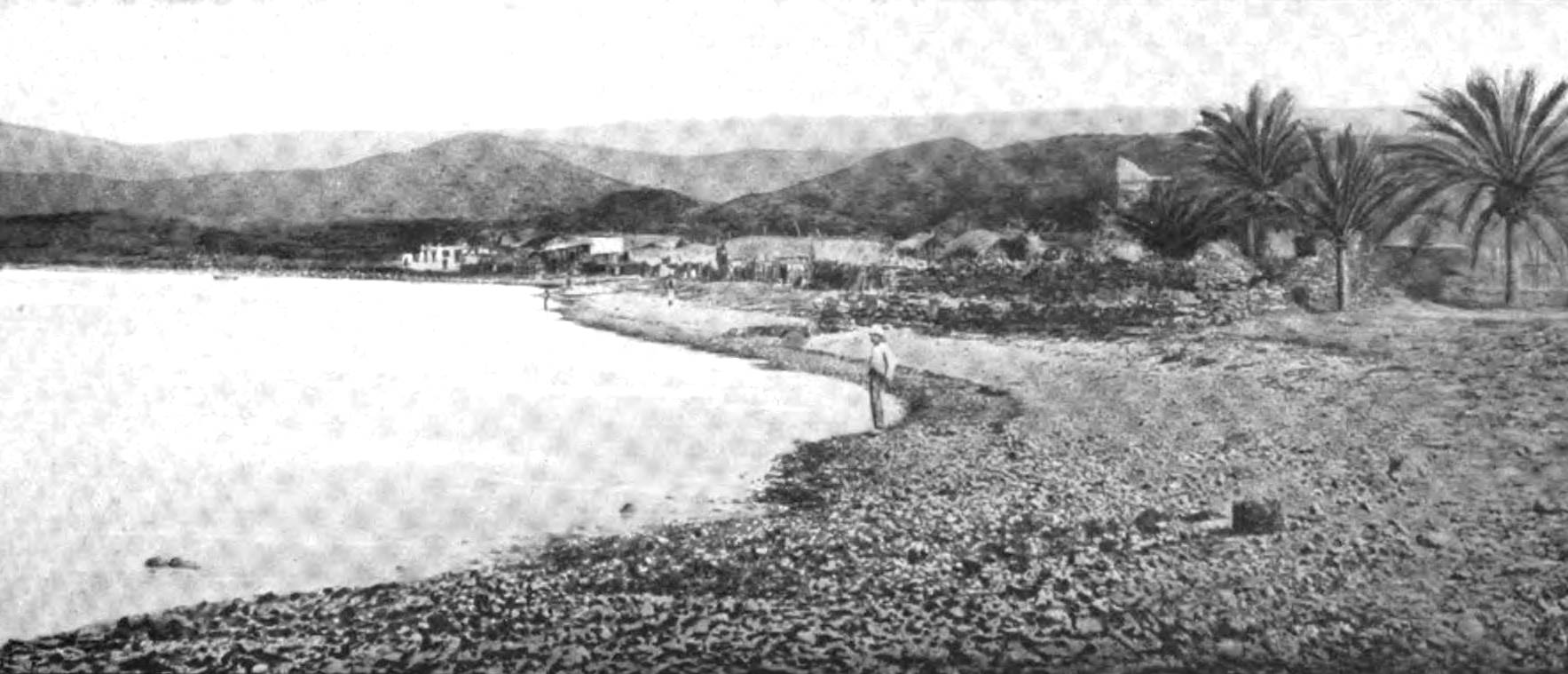
Tadjoura in 1887

The French interest in the coast of the Red Sea near Tadjoura began with Rochet d'Hericourt's exploration into Shoa (1839–42). Further exploration by Henri Lambert, French Consular Agent at Aden, and Captain Fleuriot de Langle led to a treaty of friendship and assistance between France and the sultans of Raheita, Tadjoura, and Gobaad. A skillful Somali merchant Haji Sharmarke Ali Saleh also collected a tribute of 1,200-1,600 thalers annually from the inhabitants of Tadjourah, equivalent to a massive sum in modern currency and was ousted after French resident Lambert's murder. Growing French interest in the area took place against a backdrop of British activity in Egypt and the opening of the Suez Canal in 1869. Between 1883 and 1887, France signed various treaties with the then ruling Somali and Afar Sultans, which allowed it to expand the protectorate to include the Gulf of Tadjoura. Léonce Lagarde was subsequently installed as the protectorate's governor. In 1894, he established a permanent French administration in the city of Djibouti and named the region Côte française des Somalis (French Somaliland). The slave trade was abolished by decree on 26 October 1889; however, Noel-Buxton reported that Tajoura still remained a center of the slave trade, but "limited to small though frequent shipments." While during the 1880s the port served as a distribution point for rifles and ammunition to Shewa and Ethiopia (during this period, Arthur Rimbaud lived in the city), Tajoura's importance inevitably declined with the construction of the Ethio-Djibouti Railways, which connected Djibouti with the hinterlands. The railway began to carry traffic on 22 July 1901, was extended to Dire Dawa 17 months later, and finally to Addis Ababa on 3 December 1929.

=== Djibouti ===
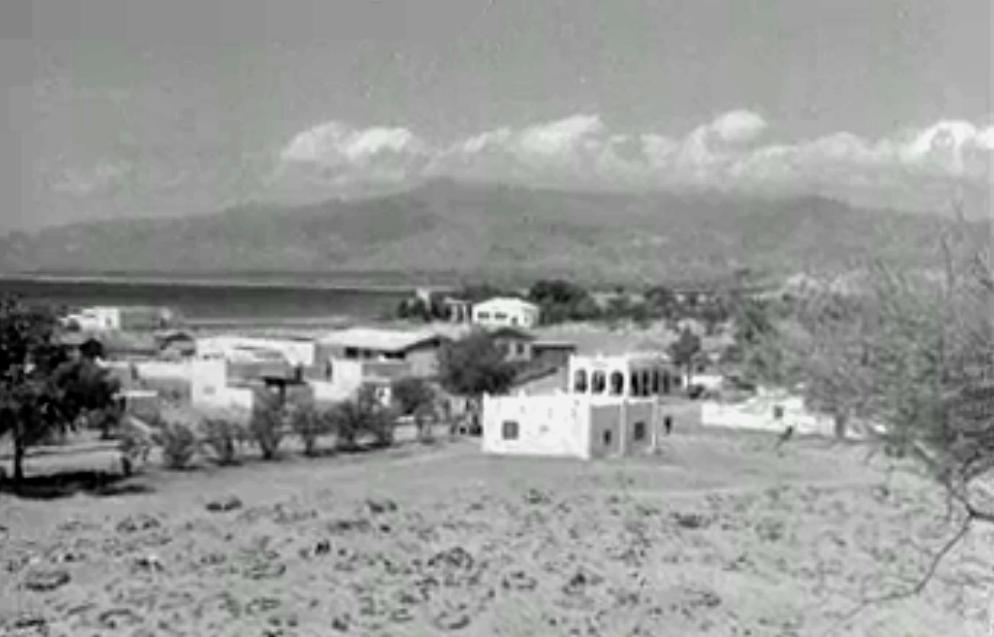
Tadjoura in 1971

The Djibouti government established various large-scale public works programmes to renovate the city. The Tadjoura port was modernized in 2000, at a cost of US $1.64 million. The work was described as part of the government's effort to help the economic development of the districts of Tadjourah, Obock, Ali Sabieh and Dikhil. The new Port of Tadjoura has been built to mainly focus on general cargo, such as livestock, sesame, frankincense, fertilizers and grain, at the cost of US $90 million. Initially the port has been developed in the aim to transport mainly potash from Ethiopia's Afar Region, while the mining is not yet developed. Besides that the port has a potential to provide for northern Djibouti and to its closest outlet for Ethiopia's Afar and Tigray regions. Compared with the traditional route from ports in Djibouti via Galafi, the new road (RN-11) from Tadjoura to Balho shortens the driving hour significantly.

== Climate ==
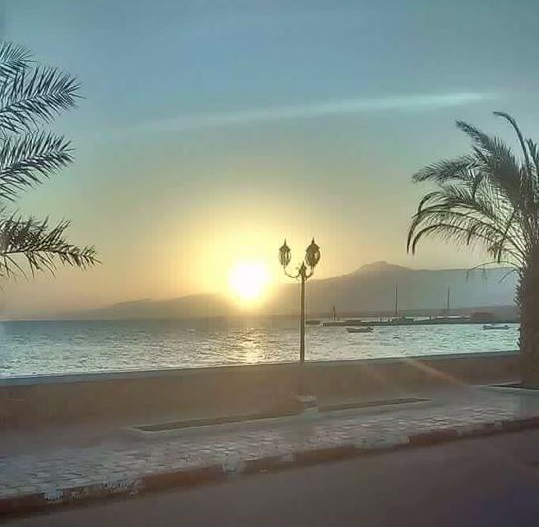
Tadjoura beach at sunset.

Featuring an arid climate, the town sees on average 186 mm (7.31 in) of rainfall per year. Average temperatures range from 26 °C (79 °F) in winter to 36 °C (97 °F) in summer.

Climate data for Tadjoura
Month	Jan	Feb	Mar	Apr	May	Jun	Jul	Aug	Sep	Oct	Nov	Dec	Year
Mean daily maximum °C (°F)	29.0 (84.2)	29.2 (84.6)	31.1 (88.0)	33.1 (91.6)	36.0 (96.8)	39.7 (103.5)	41.7 (107.1)	40.6 (105.1)	37.6 (99.7)	34.0 (93.2)	31.3 (88.3)	29.7 (85.5)	34.4 (94.0)
Daily mean °C (°F)	25.6 (78.1)	26.3 (79.3)	27.9 (82.2)	29.7 (85.5)	32.4 (90.3)	35.7 (96.3)	36.4 (97.5)	35.6 (96.1)	34.2 (93.6)	30.3 (86.5)	27.8 (82.0)	26.2 (79.2)	30.7 (87.2)
Mean daily minimum °C (°F)	22.2 (72.0)	23.3 (73.9)	24.6 (76.3)	26.2 (79.2)	28.7 (83.7)	31.7 (89.1)	31.1 (88.0)	30.5 (86.9)	30.7 (87.3)	26.5 (79.7)	24.2 (75.6)	22.7 (72.9)	26.9 (80.4)
Average precipitation mm (inches)	13 (0.5)	10 (0.4)	17 (0.7)	14 (0.6)	9 (0.4)	2 (0.1)	2 (0.1)	27 (1.1)	12 (0.5)	18 (0.7)	35 (1.4)	27 (1.1)	186 (7.6)
Source 1: Climate-Data.org, altitude: 12m
Source 2: Levoyageur

== Transportation ==
=== Sea transport ===
From Djibouti City to Tadjoura, it takes a two and a half hour ferry ride.

=== Land transport ===
The distance between Djibouti City is 130 km.

=== Air transport ===
For air transportation, Tajdoura is served by the Tadjoura Airport.

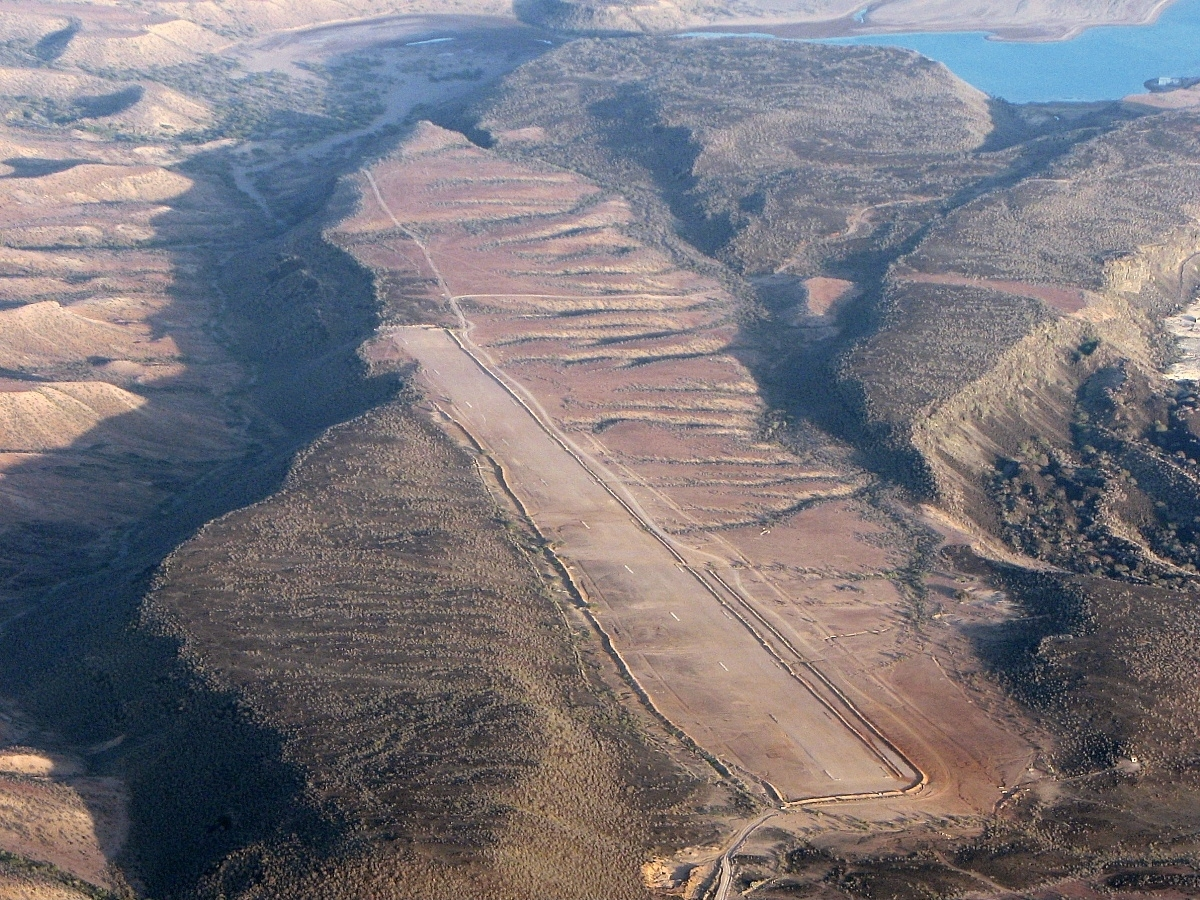
Aerial view of a landing strip at the Tadjoura Airport.

It takes 30 minutes to travel from Djibouti City to Tadjoura.

== Sultans ==
The following is a list of sultans of Tadjoura:

- 1620 Burhan bin Muhammad
- 1630 Dini bin Muhammad
- 1655 Kamil bin Burhan
- 1655 Hamad bin Dini (or Muhammad bin Dini)
- 1680 Musa bin Kamil
- 1680 Dini bin Hamad (or Nasser bin Hamad)
- 1705 Hamad bin Musa
- 1705 Muhammad bin Dini
- 1740 Muhammad bin Hamad
- 1770 Hamad bin Naser
- 1770 Hummad bin Muhammad
- 1800-1820 Mandaytu bin Hamad
- 1821-1859 Ad'allom Muhammad bin Hummad
- 1860-9 Mar 1862 Muhammad bin Mandaytu
- 1863-1879 Hummad bin Ad'allom Muhammad
- 1880-24 Aug 1912 Hummad bin Muhammad
- 2 Dec 1913-6 Aug 1927 Muhammad bin Arbahim
- Dec 1928-21 Apr 1962 Hummad bin Muhammad bin Arbahim
- 18 May 1964 – 1984 Habib bin Hummad bin Muhammad
- 1985 - 17 May 2019 Abd'ul Kadir bin Hummad bin Muhammad bin Arbahim

== Notable people ==
- Dileita Mohamed Dileita, Former Prime Minister of Djibouti
