= Tadjoura Airport =

Airport in Djibouti

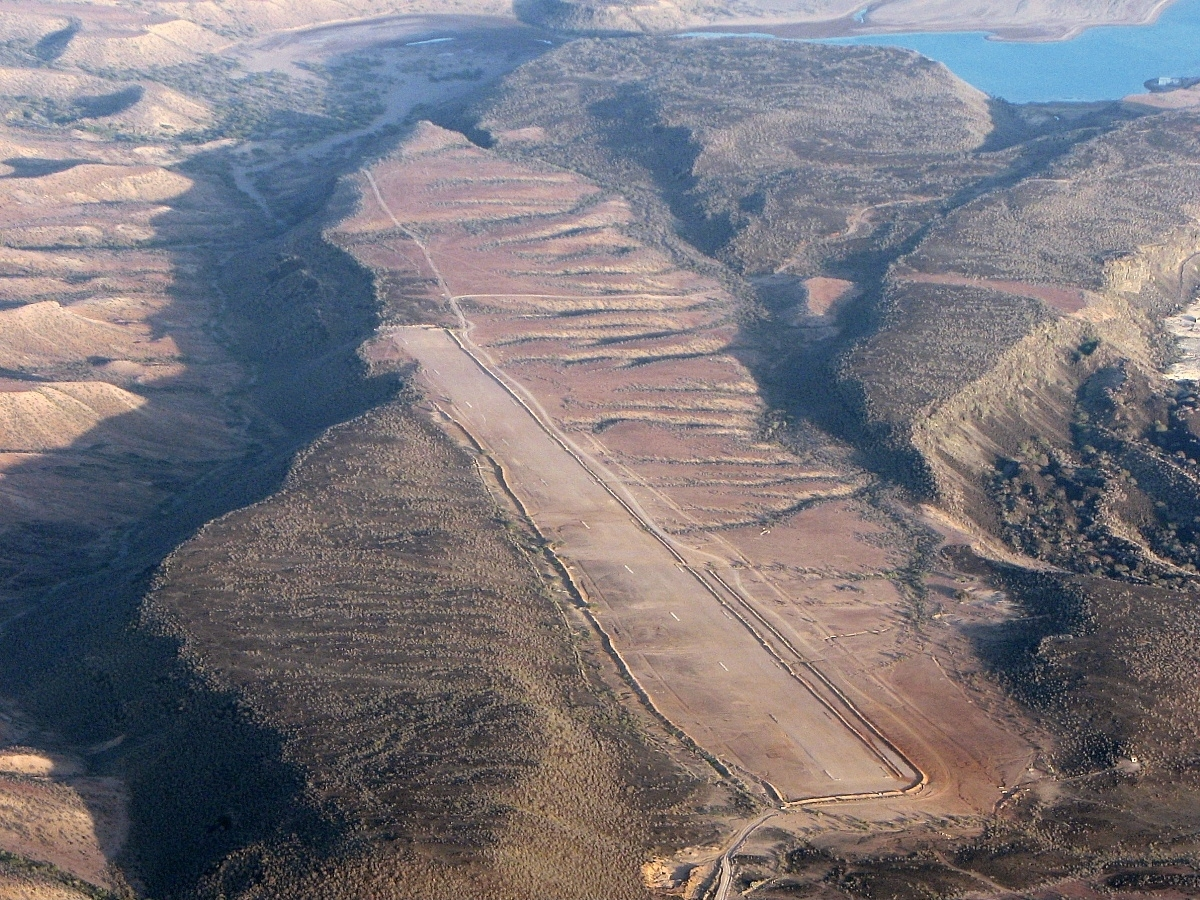
- IATA: TDJ; ICAO: HDTJ

Summary
- Airport type: Public
- Serves: Tadjoura, Djibouti
- Elevation AMSL: 246 ft / 75 m
- Coordinates: 11°47′00″N 42°55′00″E

Map
- Location within Djibouti

Runways
Direction	Length		Surface
Direction	m	ft	Surface
	1,000	3,281

Tadjoura Airport (IATA: TDJ, ICAO: HDTJ) is an airport serving the city of Tadjoura in the north-central Tadjoura Region of Djibouti.
