= Léonce Lagarde =

French colonial administrator

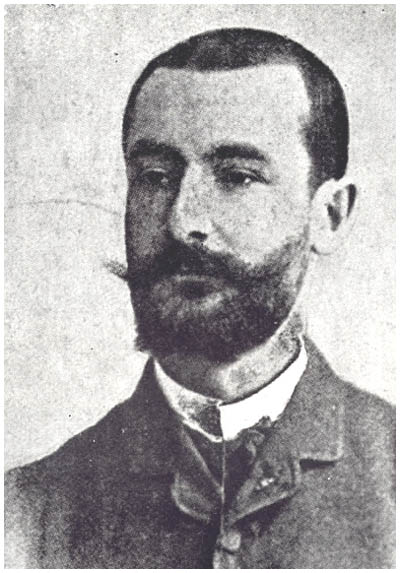
Léonce Lagarde

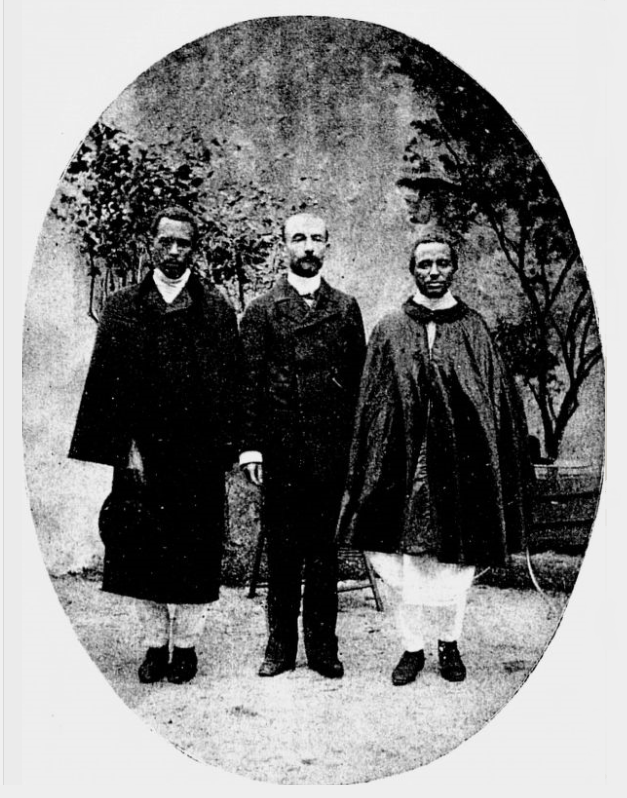
Léonce Lagarde (middle) with two Ethiopian princes in 1898

Léonce Lagarde, Count de Rouffeyroux, Duke of Enttoto (1860 – 15 February 1936) was a French colonial governor of French Somaliland and ambassador.

== Biography ==
In 1882, Lagarde was named secretary to the governor of Cochinchina. One year later, he was designated Commandant de Cercle of French Senegal. However, it was a post that time did not allow him to serve because he was soon appointed French colonial governor of Obock Territory in Africa, a position he held for fifteen years, from 1884 to 1899.

Lagarde founded the port city of Djibouti in 1888 and moved his administration there from the city of Obock. He expanded French territory outwards around the Gulf of Tadjoura. In doing so, he created the protectorate known as the French Somali Coast (Côte française des Somalis), also called "French Somaliland." (It was later named the French Territory of the Afars and the Issas, and in 1977, gained its independence as the Republic of Djibouti.)

As ambassador to Ethiopian Emperor Menelik II, Lagarde built-up French presence in the Horn of Africa to protect the colony from British domination, which was slowly expanding from Egypt. In 1896, he gained approval to build a railway line directly from Djibouti to Addis Ababa. Relations between Lagarde and the Ethiopian establishment was strained, however, and a French official (Deputy François Deloncle to the newspaper L'Ouest-Éclair) was reported to state in early 1903 that the emperor refused to see the French representative, and had made his dislike of him clear to the French foreign ministry several times.

At the beginning of World War I in 1914, Lagarde headed the Service for Wounded Sailors and Prisoners of War. He remained at the Naval Ministry in an administrative position after the war, from 1920 to his retirement in 1929.
