= Alphonse Fleuriot de Langle =

French naval officer and maritime prefect (1809–1881)

Vice Admiral Alphonse Fleuriot de Langle
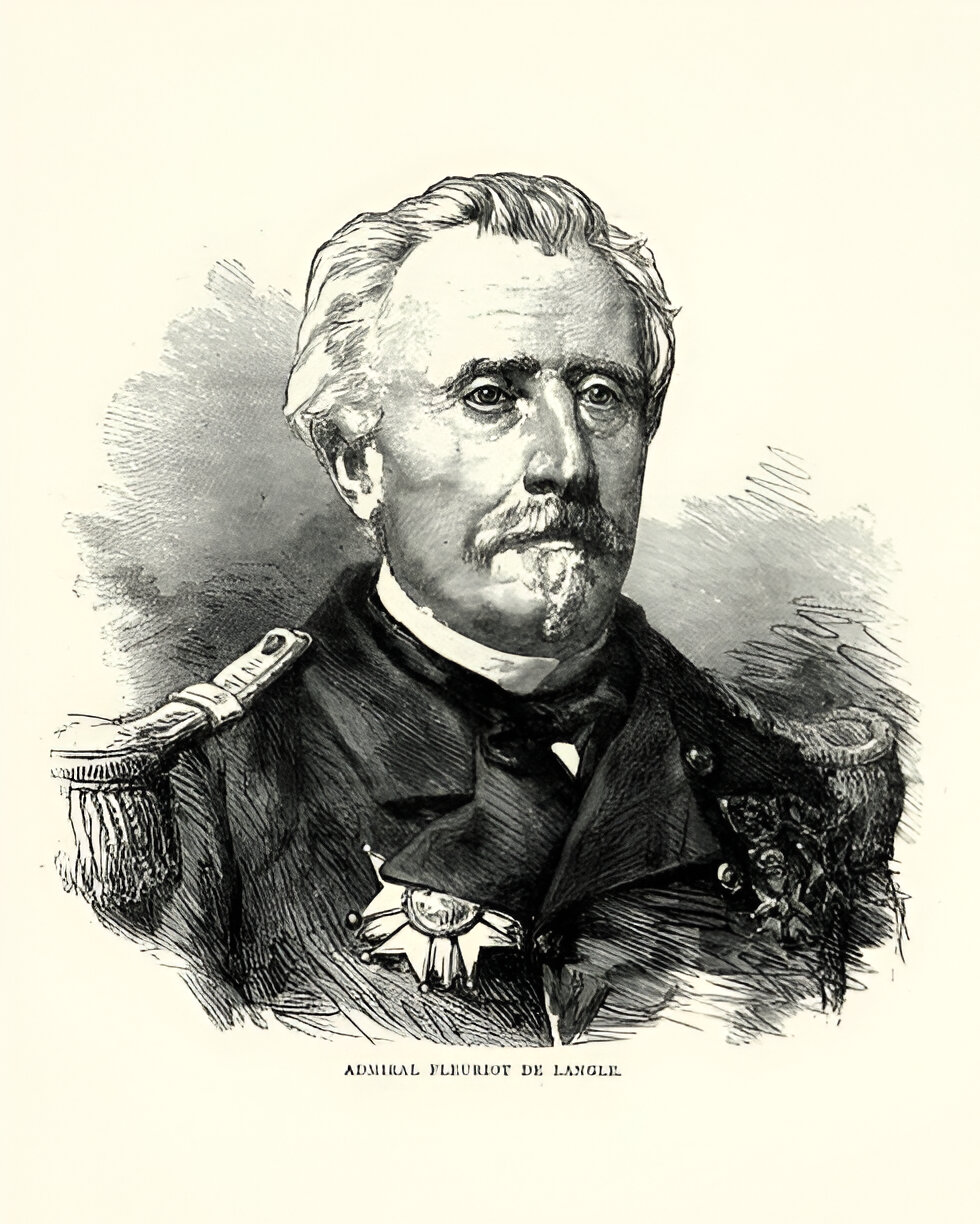
- An illustration of Alphonse Fleuriot De Langle by Léonce Rousset

Maritime Prefect of Brest
- In office 26 June 1873 – 16 May 1874

Personal details
- Born: 16 May 1809 Plouigneau, France
- Died: 22 July 1881 (aged 72) 8th arrondissement of Paris, France
- Children: Émile Fleuriot de Langle
- Parent(s): Jean-Charles Fleuriot de Langle (father); Mélite de Fresnel (mother)
- Education: École navale

Military service
- Battles/wars: French conquest of Algeria; Crimean War; Franco-Prussian War

Alphonse Fleuriot de Langle (born Alphonse Jean René Fleuriot de Langle; May 16, 1809 – July 22, 1881) was a French naval officer, from Plouigneau (Finistère), who took part in the capture of Algiers in 1830 and later suppressed the African slave trade. He served in the Crimean War in 1855 and the Indian Ocean, where he led coastal explorations to establish a French naval base, supervised the settlement in Obock, and helped found the French presence at Djibouti. As head of the French fleet in the 1860s, he oversaw maritime routes in the Indian Ocean and investigated Henri Lambert's death. Retiring as a vice-admiral in 1874, he died in Paris on 22 July 1881.

== Early life ==
Alphonse Jean René Fleuriot de Langle was a distinguished naval officer and a descendant of the Astrolabe commander, Paul Fleuriot de Langle, who perished during La Pérouse’s ill-fated expedition. Born into a prestigious family of Navy officers, it was almost inevitable that he would pursue the same path. At 18 years old, on October 7, 1827, he achieved the rank of Aspirant, where he formed lasting friendships with classmates like R.A. Darrican. De Langle’s lineage included ties to prominent Breton families, such as the Marquis de Kerouartz and the Dukes of Elbeuf, as well as a connection to the Norman Fresnel family through his mother. He married into the Monneraye family, further solidifying his place in the French aristocracy. After the death of his elder brother in 1845, who was also a naval officer, de Langle inherited the title of Viscount, officially recorded in the Navy Officers’ register in 1858, following the practices reinstated by Napoleon III.

== Biography ==
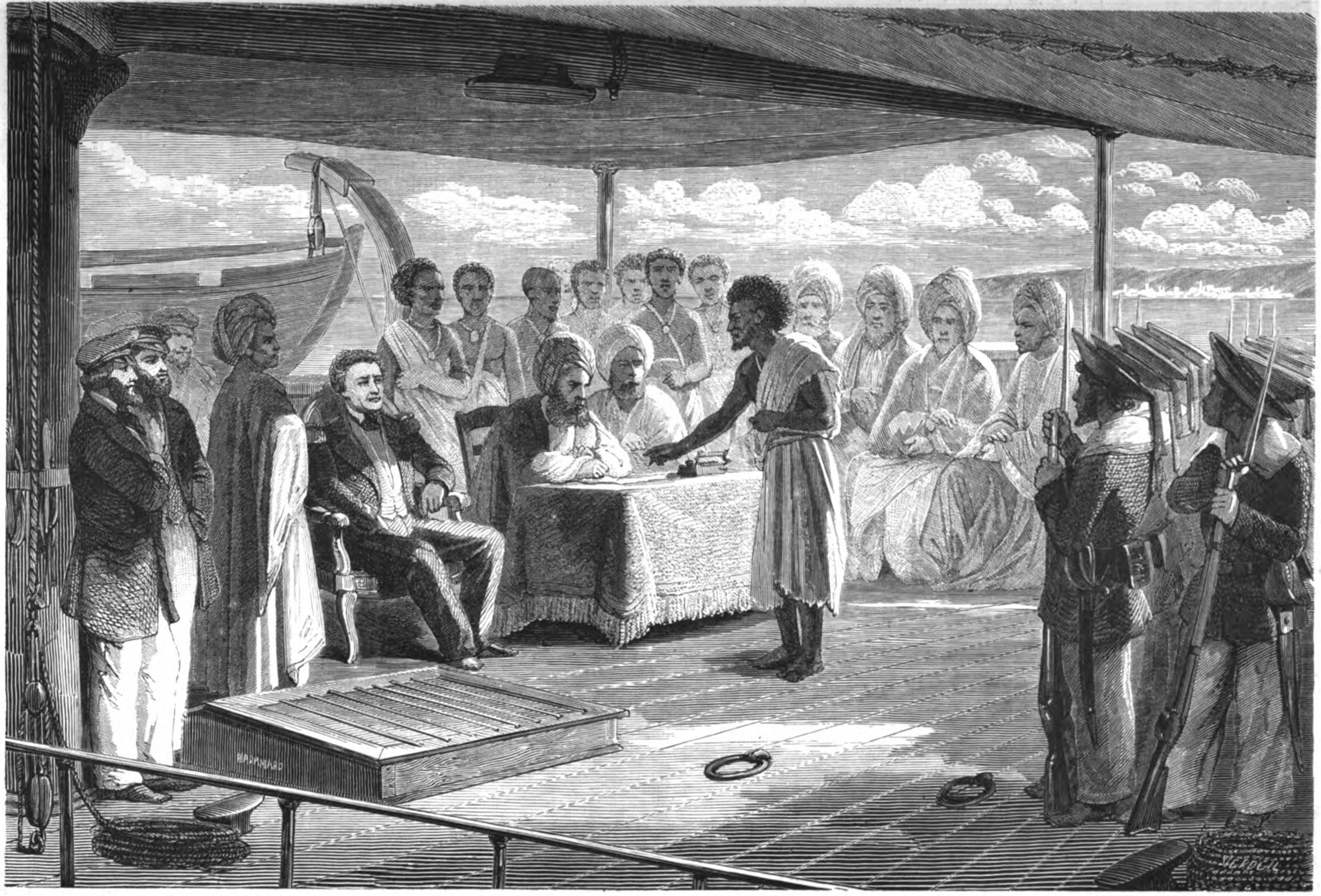
Deposition of Abdul Ahy before the Qadi of Zeila and Commander Fleuriot de Langle, engraving published in Le Tour du monde in 1862

Fleuriot de Langle’s naval career spanned decades and was marked by a variety of notable accomplishments. In 1830, he participated in the expedition to Algiers aboard the Duquesne, and later that same year, he was part of the campaign in the Antilles. He also played a role in the blockade of Antwerp in 1833 while serving on the Flore. His exploratory spirit was evident in his service aboard the Recherche during campaigns to Spitzbergen and Norway. By 1840, he had earned his first command aboard the Malouine, attached to the Naval Division of the West African coast. During this mission, he honed his skills as a diplomat and negotiator, forging treaties with local populations as a Government Commissioner. In 1845, his diplomatic acumen earned him a role alongside M. de Broglie in England, where they successfully negotiated the removal of Britain’s right to inspect French ships. His career continued with a series of impactful assignments. Returning to West Africa aboard the Caraïbe, he led campaigns in the southern seas. In 1848, he commanded the Poursuivante, followed by the Génie and the Andromède, which he took to La Plata. He played an instrumental role in the Crimean War from 1854 to 1856, serving on the Turenne, during which he transported 6,000 troops to the frontlines. His leadership during these pivotal conflicts demonstrated both his military and logistical expertise.

De Langle’s most significant role came as Commander of the Naval Station for the East African Coasts. His responsibilities were vast, encompassing the surveillance of Indian Ocean maritime routes, protecting French political and economic interests, ensuring the safety of merchant ships, and overseeing the recruitment of workers. His assignments brought him to regions such as Madagascar, Mascate, and Zanzibar. He was particularly involved in Zanzibar during the investigation into the death of Lambert, an episode that highlighted the complexity of his duties and the extended nature of his missions. He married Suzanne Armande de La Monneraye, grandniece of Pierre Bruno Jean de La Monneraye, on 29 June 1836 in Morlaix, a first cousin once removed. Their son, Émile Fleuriot de Langle (1837–1881), assistant to the explorer Joseph Lambert in Madagascar, had with the Djoumbé (sultana) Fatima of Mohéli, a daughter, Salima, the last queen of Mohéli (1874–1964), who was deposed by the French government and exiled to France in 1909.
