= Dini Ahmed Abou Baker =

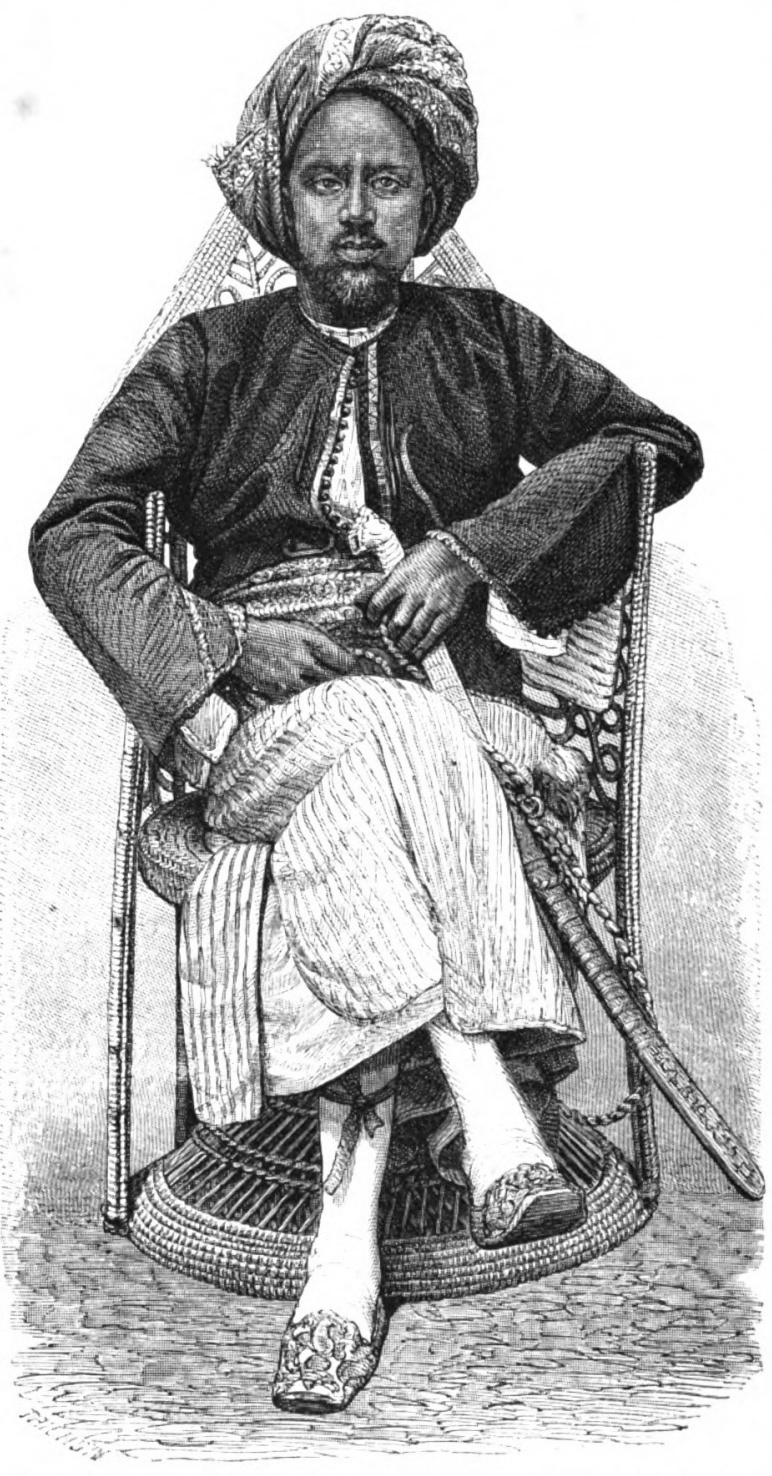
- 1862 engraving of Dini Aboubeker in the Le Tour Du Monde

Dini Ahmed Abou Baker (Diny Ahmed Aboubekr, or Dini Ahmad Dini) was the main Afar signatory of the March 1862 treaty that sold the western coast of Bab-el-Mandeb between Ras Ali and Doumeira to France for 10,000 thalers. He was the son of "sultan" Mohamed Hammed. According to Ahmed Dini, he is actually "sultan" of Rehayto under the name of Dini Mohamed Bourhan. He was one of Abubakr Pasha's nephews and in 1839, he was responsible for accompanying Rochet D'Hericourt through Afar territories. In 1862, he visited Paris, in the name of sultans of Tadjourah and Raheita, ceding territory from Ras Doumeira to Goubet El-Kharrab.

== Treaties with France ==
Dini Ahmed Abou Baker went to Paris in 1862 aboard the Somme, commanded by Alphonse Fleuriot de Langle. He signed the Treaty of Transfer of Obock on behalf of the "sultans" Mohammed ben Mohamed, Diny Koullou Osman Aly Ibrahim Aboubekr Chahm and Loeita, "leaders of the tribes of the Danakils Adalys and Debenehs". This transfer was implemented in 1884 with the creation of the Obock Territory.

In 1863, Dini Ahmed wrote to the French Minister of Foreign Affairs, Édouard Thouvenel, to ask him for his protection against the Ottoman pasha of Hodeida who requested the payment of 9,000 thalers, probably that of the Zeila customs granted to Abu-Bakr.

In 1885, at the time of the colonial installation, Diny Ahmed confirmed the terms of the 1862 text.
