= Henri Lambert (explorer) =

French explorer and diplomat in the Red Sea (1828–1859)

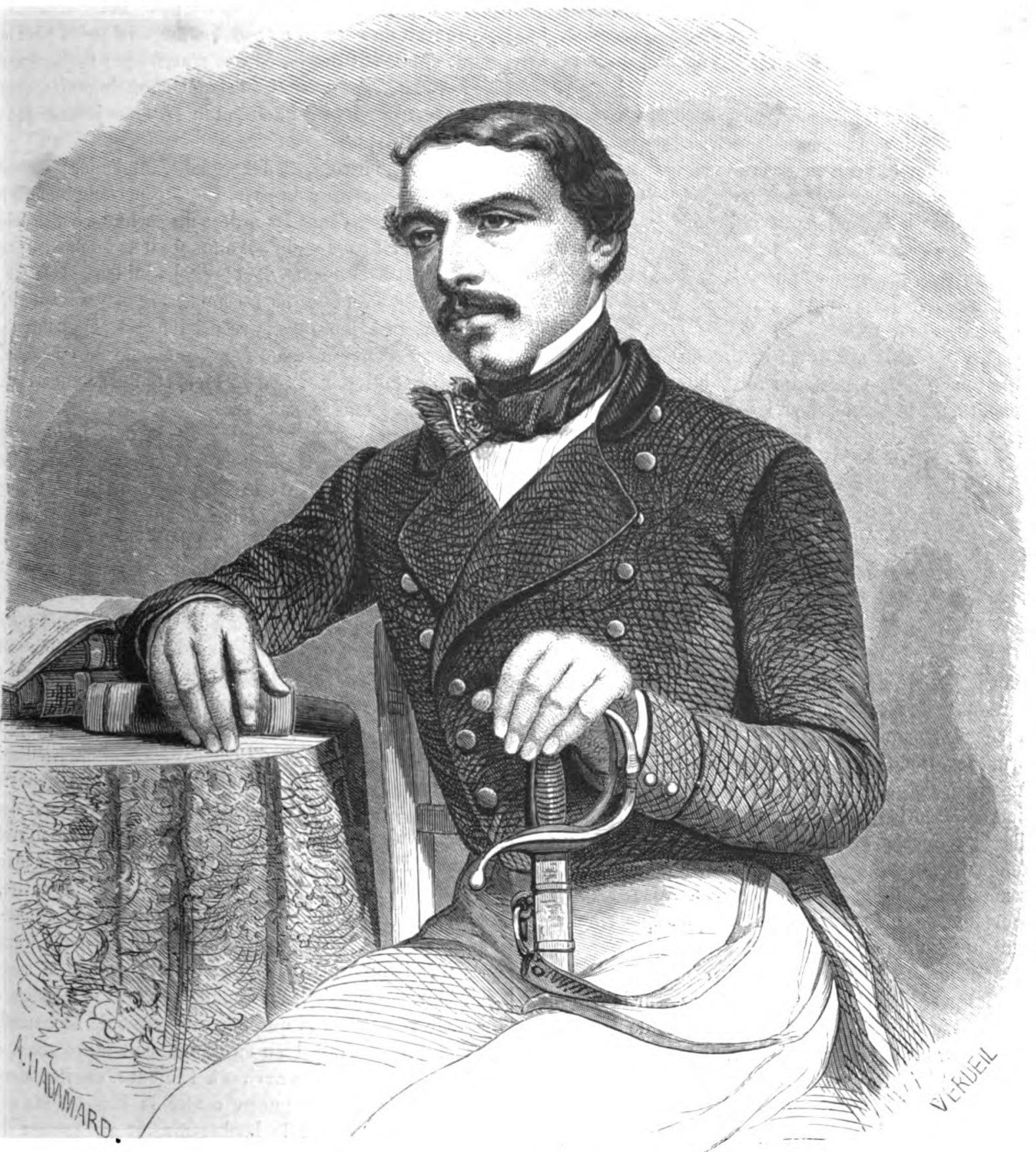
- Henri Lambert, engraving published in Le Tour du monde in 1862.
- Born: May 16, 1828; Redon, France
- Died: June 4, 1859 (aged 31); Moucha Island
- Parents: Amable Joseph Lambert (father); Rosalie Marie Joseph Dubois (mother)
- Relatives: Joseph-François Lambert (brother)

Henri Lambert (born Henri Marie César Lambert; May 16, 1828 – June 4, 1859), was a French explorer, diplomat and trader. He was responsible for convincing the French government to establish a colony in modern-day Djibouti to counter British influence in the Gulf of Aden.

== Early life ==
Lambert's family, originally from Nantes, claimed descent from the monarchy and from the prosecutors at the Presidential Court. Amable Joseph Lambert, Henri Lambert's father, was a customs auditor. He belonged to the “provincial petty bourgeoisie” having no properties in the Nantes region. Amable Joseph Lambert married quite lately with Rosalie Marie Joseph Dubois. The couple resided for a long time in Redon, where Amable Joseph was employed. It was there that Joseph François Lambert was born on February 14, 1824, and Henri Marie César was born on May 16, 1828. The couple also had three other children, Louis, Pierre and Sophie. Joseph Lambert, had received a satisfactory education for the time while Henri Lambert, had to leave school at 14.

Henri embarked on September 1, 1842, at the age of fourteen, as a cabin boy on the three-masted Quos-Ego of Nantes, then as a pilot on the Brig Saphir and the three-masted Courrier de St Pierre, Marie and again Quos-Ego. As a registered sailor, he had a total of 28 months of navigation on November 26, 1846, including a voyage to La Réunion. He had good reviews from his Captains due to his zeal, regularity of conduct, great activity for his service. He entered the Imperial Navy in early 1847, at the age of 18. He was on board the Descartes on January 9, 1847, until his arrival in Port Louis in 1850.

== Mercantile career ==
Henri departed from Port Louis on September 17, 1855, aboard the Bayadère, a modest vessel that transported him to La Réunion. By taking this route, he avoided the detour via Pointe de Galle, which was typically required by the sailing schooners connecting Port Louis to Ceylon. In La Réunion, he boarded another ship, likely a merchant vessel, destined for Arabia. His journey included a stopover on the island of Socotra, which he passed on October 1, 1855. Eventually, on October 9, 1855, he arrived at the port of Aden, specifically at Steamer Point, a harbor named by the English as a regular docking point for their steamboats. After settling in Aden, Henri found himself under English jurisdiction, subject to the political and military authority of officers serving Queen Victoria. His activities in Aden were influenced by the political and economic framework established by the East India Company, which maintained a significant presence and authority in the region.

On 13 October 1855, he embarked on a journey over multiple stopovers throughout the Red Sea, beginning with Zeila on the 16th. This is where he paid a visit to the city's governor, who was subordinate to the Ottoman Pasha of Al-Hodeydah. He mentioned that the tribes of the country do not recognise his authority and obey their respective chiefs. He took note that travelling through the interior required a firearm or never go out in the evening

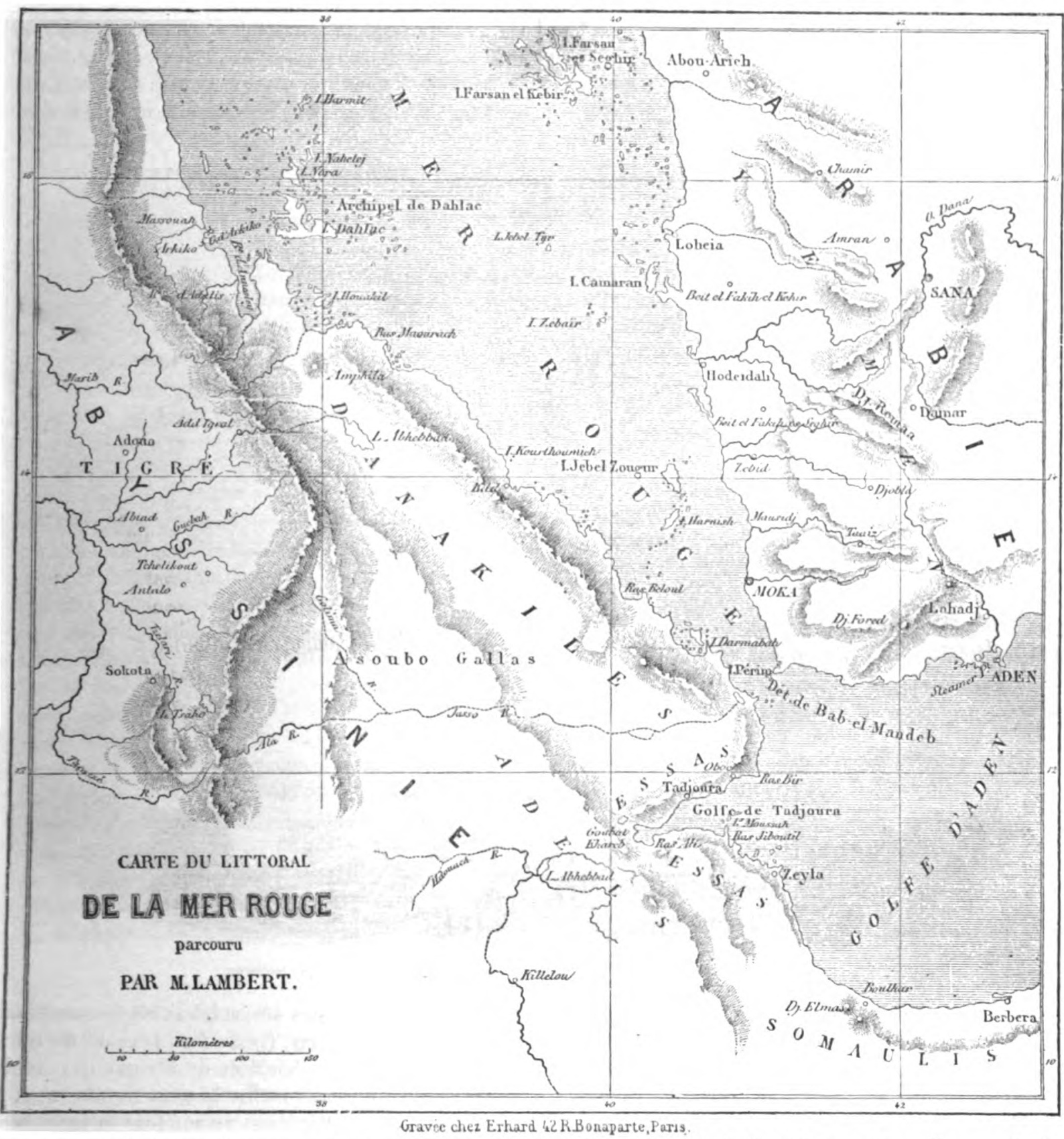
Henri Lambert's map of the Red Sea in 1855

and be careful not to cross, even during the day, the gates of the city, unless accompanied by a detachment. This was due to the wandering tribes of Issa bedouins who roam and pillage travellers without pity. Lambert set sail to Tadjoura on the 18th, where he met the local vizier, Mohammed bin Mohammed, was described as an independent, shrewd leader who claimed descent from the Prophet Muhammad and held ambivalent views toward foreign powers, favoring the French over the English and Turks. Coghlan's meeting with the chief on October 25 was brief and strained, reportedly due to discussions about the abolition of slavery and English support for the ousted Sharmarke Ali Salih. The vizier's hostility led Coghlan to reclaim the gifts he had brought, and he allegedly warned Mohammed bin Mohammed against offering protection to any French visitors to Tadjoura. Lambert then travelled to Mokha on the 22nd where he discussed its decrepit state, it was there he met a Persian merchant called Abderasoul, who was established in the city and whom Lambert made his correspondent. Lambert left Mokha after a stay of twenty-four hours and sailed towards Al-Hodeydah where he met the Turkish Pasha, an elderly man with whom he forms a certain friendship. The Pasha had imprisoned Sharmarke for theft, replacing him in Zeila with Abubakr, disregarding pressure from Aden. He left Hodeidah on the 28 making a brief stop at the island of Huakel while passing through the Dahlak Archipelago. He reached Massawa on the 29th, staying there for a month to assess the commercial resources. He returned to Aden on 26 December, ultimately remaining there between January 22 to April 11, 1856, as he was interested in Zeila's political activity regarding Sharmake Ali Salih being dispossessed by the Ottoman Pasha of Al-Hodeydah. During this time, his brother was trying to secure French investment in its protectorate project over Madagascar.

Henri Lambert embarked on his second voyage to the Red Sea following the lifting of the blockade of Zeila. Departing Aden on April 11 aboard a rented dhow, he arrived in Zeila the next day, receiving a warm welcome from its residents and the local chief, Aboubakr. During his stay, he witnessed a Bedouin fantasia and discussed trade relations, securing promises of cooperation and protection. Continuing to Tadjoura, Lambert reunited with the elder Mohamed bin Mohamed, who informed him of British efforts to discourage French influence in the region. Despite local tensions, Lambert successfully negotiated for livestock and witnessed a caravan bound for Shoa, gaining insights into the customs of the Issa people. Lambert next visited Obock, where he was regarded as the first European to land in the area. He explored the surrounding countryside, noted for its active volcano and thermal springs, and established rapport with the local Danakil community through gifts and diplomacy. Departing Obock on May 5, he made brief stops in Mokha and Al-Hodeydah, where festivities celebrated the end of the Crimean War and earned him the nickname "bird of good omen" from the Turks. On his return journey, Lambert fell ill but managed to stop in Mocha to recover. He secured offers of laborers and local goods, including wheat, millet, and coffee. Exhausted, he crossed the Bab el-Mandeb on May 15 and arrived in Aden on May 20, marking the end of his eventful expedition.

The British authorities in Aden suspected him of being an agent of the French government seeking a suitable port in the region for French expansion, which accelerated the British government's decision to occupy Perim in December 1856. Henri Lambert travelled to Mauritius after hearing rumours of his brother Joseph’s death in Madagascar, only to find him alive but suffering from fevers. Joseph had defied a ban and returned to Madagascar in May 1857. Alongside Ida Pfeiffer and other Europeans, he became involved in a failed plot to overthrow Queen Ranavalona and her Prime Minister, leading to his banishment from Madagascar in September 1857. The Port Louis–Aden line saw little activity during this period, and Joseph, focused on his Malagasy ventures, soon departed for Europe, particularly Paris, where he continued to hope for French colonisation of Madagascar.

Henri Lambert's appointment as Consular Agent of France in Aden remains unclear but was likely facilitated by his brother Joseph's efforts during his visits to France in 1856-1857 and contact with the Minister of Foreign Affairs. Officially recognized by the Governor-General of India in Calcutta on September 2, 1857, Lambert received his appointment letter from interim French Consul Angelucci on October 10, 1857. After Angelucci's replacement by Boilleau on November 1, 1857, Lambert was formally integrated into the consular service. He submitted his credentials to Brigadier Coghlan on February 1, 1858, and received official acknowledgment from the Governor of Aden the same day.

In May 1, 1858, a dispute arose involving Commandant Mequet, who had reimbursed 4,000 thalers extorted from Aboubeker by Ahmed Pacha under the pretext of embezzling materials from the French ship Caïman. Despite recovering the funds, Mequet did not return them to Aboubakr, citing ambiguity over whether the money belonged to the Imperial Navy. The matter drew the attention of Lambert, who contacted Admiral Hamelin, Minister of the Navy, and Count Walewski, Minister of Foreign Affairs, highlighting English interest in the Tadjourah territory and Aboubakr’s pro-French stance, which had antagonized the British. Admiral Hamelin later confirmed plans to reimburse Aboubakr.

On July 5, 1858, Lambert acknowledged receipt of Admiral Hamelin's letter and included emphatic declarations from Aboubeker, then in Aden, pledging loyalty to Napoleon III and France. Aboubakr offered to cede the port of Ras Ali and the Bay of Ouano, jointly owned with the vizier, Mohamed bin Mohamed, for 10,000 thalers. Lambert forwarded the original offer, written in Arabic, with a brief translation. On July 16, he confirmed the offer to Hamelin and relayed Aboubakr's request for a French protectorate over Choa. Although unable to travel to Paris as Aboubakr suggested, Lambert proposed delegating the mission to Commandant Mequet, believing the recent British occupation of Perim Island would deter English objections to French intervention.

Henri Lambert, after offering his resignation due to financial and health issues, reconsidered following a letter from Prince Napoleon urging him to continue his consular duties in Aden. Struggling with destitution and receiving little support from Paris, Lambert tried to maintain his role but faced mounting challenges, including the refusal of J. Gautier to succeed him and critical reports from Commander Tricault. He sought assistance from his friend Augustin Thomas, who carried verbal messages and financial support to help Lambert settle debts. Despite these efforts, Lambert’s appeals for recognition and resources were met with silence or bureaucratic inaction. On April 27, 1859, he officially resigned, citing abandonment and prolonged indifference from his government. Thanking the English governor for his hospitality, Lambert closed the consular agency. He left Aden on the Nasseri, at the earliest on the afternoon of April 29, 1859, and arrived in Hodeidah, at the latest on the evening of April 30. Lambert chose to prolong his stay in Al-Hodeydah, remaining in Yemen for a month. The Nasseri encountered contrary winds and had to stop twice at Methenna, across from Zuqar Island. It was only on May 30 that the ship reached Mokha. Lambert stayed there for two days with his correspondent, the Persian Abderasoul.

== Death ==
Lambert went aboard on the dhow Nasseri, where from Mocha on the afternoon of Friday, June 3, 1859, departed towards Tadjoura. The Nasseri anchored near the Moucha Islands in the Red Sea. Lambert, who had been navigating these waters as part of his trading and diplomatic activities, was attacked and killed by the ship's crew, led by the Nacouda Abdillahi. Accounts of the incident vary, but it is widely reported that Lambert was ambushed while sleeping, beaten with sticks, and stabbed when he attempted to resist. His body was later weighted down with stones and thrown into the sea. The motives behind the murder remain unclear but are believed to involve disputes over authority and maritime dealings. Lambert's tragic end, at just 31 years old, marked the conclusion of his adventurous life as a pioneer in the region.
