= Islands of Somalia =

The islands of Somalia are located adjacent to the Gulf of Aden to the north, the Guardafui Channel at the apex of its territory, and the Indian Ocean to the east.

== Southern coast (Bajuni Islands) ==
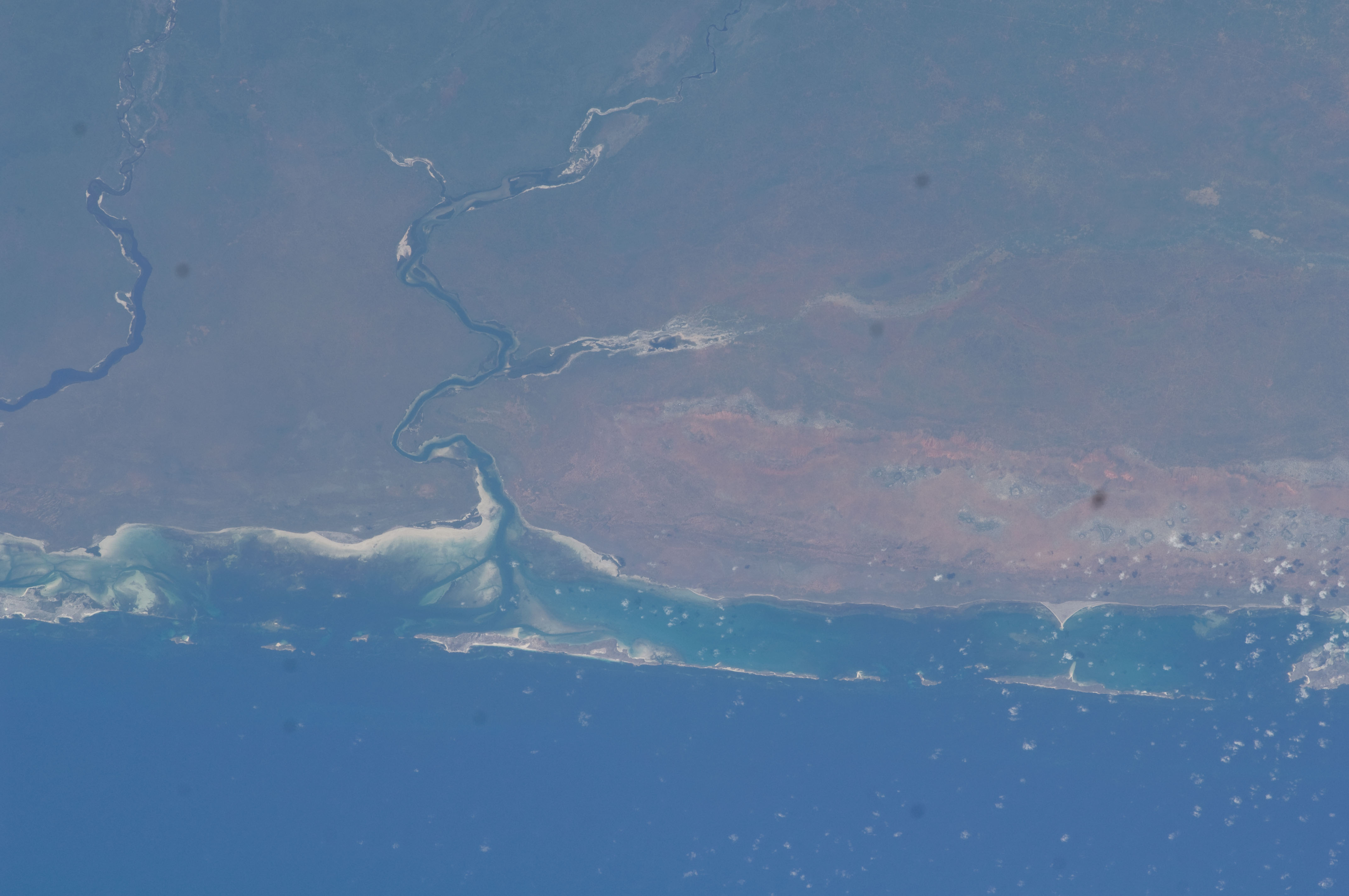
The Bajuni Islands chain extending along the southern Somali coast near Kismayo, viewed from the International Space Station in 2009.

The Bajuni Islands form a chain along the southern coastline:

- Chovaye/Tovai (largest at 5.5 km²)
- Chula (the only permanently inhabited island in the chain)
- Ngumi
- Koyama
- Fuma
- Ilisi
- Kandha Iwu
- Kismayo Island (connected to the mainland by causeway since 1961)
- Mdoa
- Buri Kavo
- Chani
- Darrakasi
- Yamani
- Kismayu Ndogo
- Ambuu
- Kitangani
- Simambaya
- Kiamboni
- Tiikow
- Faadhato
- Jasiira
- Ras Kiamboni islets

== Guardafui Channel and Northeastern region ==
- Jasiirada Khuuri (disputed / claimed by Yemen)
- Alula Islands
- Ras Hafun offshore islets
- Bosaso coastal islands
- Xaafuun Peninsula (peninsular formation)
- Gees Gwardafuy rocks

== Northern coast (Zeila Archipelago and Gulf of Aden) ==
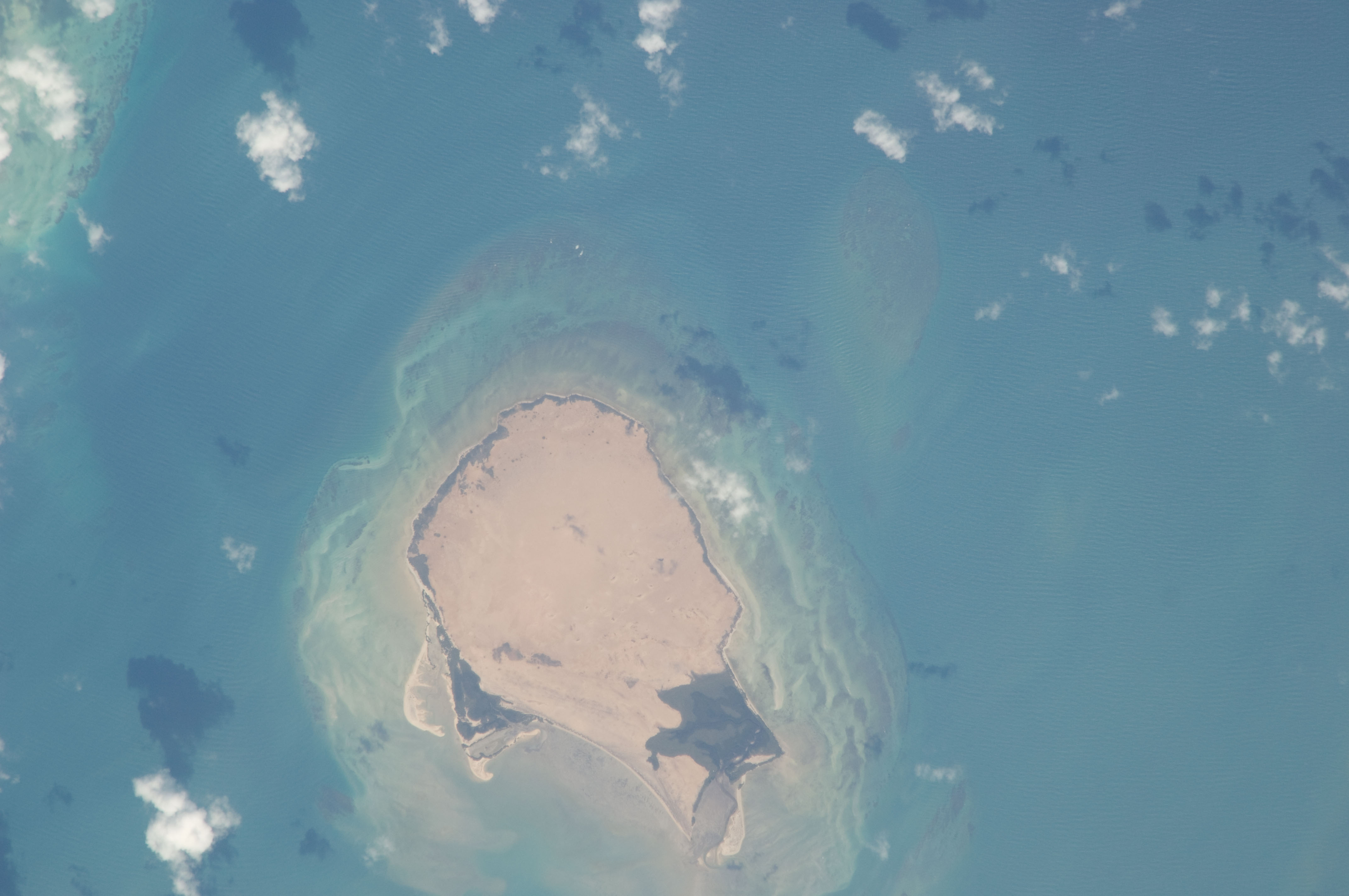
Sacadin Island near Zeila, Somaliland, the largest of the Somali Islands, as viewed from the International Space Station in 2009.

- Zeila Archipelago:
  - Sacadin (largest)
  - Aibat (site of a historic lighthouse)
  - Saad ad-Din Island
- Mait Island
- Siyara Islands
- El-Sheikh Islands
- Maydh Islands
- Heis Islands
- El-Darad Islands
- Ruguda rocks
- Xiis coastal islands
- Berbera offshore islets

== Other coastal and estuarine formations ==
- Xariim Xumaas Bar
- Isola Touata
- Labadaad
- Mombaasa
- Jumba Islands
- Bushbush Islets
- Lag Badana formations
- Xeebta Barawe Islands
- Warsheekh Islets
- Hobyo small islands
- Eyl offshore formations
- Merka coastal islands
- Xamar Islands (near Mogadishu)
- Afgooye River delta islands
- Jubba River mouth islands
- Shabeelle estuary islets
- Mogadishu Harbor islands
- Gendershe coastal formations
- Baraawe offshore islets
- Adale barrier islands
- Garacad coastal islets

== Gulf of Aden ==
Somalia's only islands in the Gulf of Aden are located in the Zeila Archipelago, the largest islands of which are Sacadin and Aibat.

== Guardafui Channel ==
Jasiirada Khuuri, which is located in the Guardafui Channel is a mere 100 kilometers from the coast of Cape Guardafui. However, since it is administrated in the Socotra Governorate, it is under Yemeni jurisdiction. Despite Khuuri and the other three islands being less than 370 km (the United Nations Convention on the Law of the Sea's definition of a state's exclusive economic zone) from Somalia's coast, they do not fall under the exclusive economic zone of Somalia. Subsequently, Somalia has submitted a request to the UN to discuss sovereignty.

== Indian Ocean ==
There are six main islands in the Bajuni archipelago. They are Jasiirada Chandra, Jasiirada Chovaye, Jasiirada Chula, Jasiirada Koyama, Jasiirada Darakasi and Jasiirada Ngumi.
