= Sheikhdom of al-Luhayya =

Sheikhdom of al-Luhayyah (Arabic: مشيخة اللحية, Mashyakha al-Luḥayya), also known as the Lordship of al-Luhayyah or the az-Zaylaʿī Sheikhdom, was a local semi-autonomous polity centered on the Red Sea port town of al-Luhayyah in the Tihāmah coastal plain of Yemen. It was not a formal sultanate but a hereditary mashyakha (sheikhdom) exercised by the az-Zaylaʿī (آل الزيلعي / al-Zaylaʿī / al-Zaylī) family, saintly scholarly lineage claiming descent from ʿAqīl b. Abī Ṭālib.

The sheikhdom originated in the late 13th century around the religious and charitable activities of the family's progenitor and functioned as a local power structure combining spiritual prestige, port control, and opportunistic political alliances into at least the 18th century.

== History and Establishment ==
Al-Luhayyah developed as a port settlement in the 13th century through the migration of Aḥmad Umar al-Zaylaʿī from Zeila on the Somali coast.

He migrated from Zaylaʿ (part of al-Ḥabaša) around age 17, built a muṣallā in al-Luhayyah, then moved to al-Maḥmūl in Wādī Mawr, where he constructed a grand mosque and zāwiya. His tomb in the Jāmiʿ al-Zaylaʿī mosque became a ziyāra site.

The Banū al-Zaylaʿī of al-Luḥayya progressively grew in line with the development of al-Luḥayya as a Red Sea commercial hub. By the early 14th century, scholars with the al-Zaylaʿī lineages of al-Luḥayya and elsewhere had begun to feature in the scholarly environment of Yemen.

== Genealogy and Family Structure ==
The az-Zaylaʿī family claims Hāshimī Qurashī sharīf descent from ʿAqīl b. Abī Ṭālib. The nasab of the progenitor is:

Aḥmad b. ʿUmar b. Muḥammad b. Ḥusayn b. Malkān (Malkāy) b. ʿAqīl b. Ḥusayn b. Ṭalḥa b. Ḥusayn b. Sulaymān b. Ḥusayn b. Abī Bakr b. ʿAlī b. Muḥammad b. Ibrāhīm b. Aḥmad b. Ḥusayn b. ʿAlī Zayn al-ʿĀbidīn ... b. ʿAqīl b. Abī Ṭālib.

Hereditary mashyakha passed through male descendants. Early successors included Abū Bakr b. Aḥmad b. ʿUmar , Muḥammad b. ʿĪsā b. Aḥmad b. ʿUmar (d. 788/1384), and Abū Bakr b. Muḥammad b. ʿĪsā (known as Ṣāḥib al-Khāl, d. 829/1426).

Branches such as Banū Ibrāhīm Munājī, al-Ḥarāmila, Āl ʿUthmān, and al-Rawājiḥa spread across Tihāmah, Jazan, ʿAsīr, Mecca, Medina, and maintained links to the Horn of Africa.

== 16th-Century Political Role ==
Faqīh Abū Bakr al-Maqbūl al-Zaylī , lord of the port of Luhayyah played a key logistical role during the 1515–1517 Mamluk invasion of the Tahirid Sultanate. he facilitated the inland advance of Mamluk forces during the campaign against the Tahirid Sultanate (1515–1517) providing material supplies, transport, and local guidance. Faqīh Abū Bakr al-Maqbūl al-Zaylī accompanied Husayn al-Kurdī and together they overwhelmed Tahirid resistance and entered Zabid victorious.

The contemporary Yemeni historian Abū Makhramaḥ records:

"The Faqīh Abū Bakr al-Maqbūl al-Zaylī, the lord of al-Luhayyah, provided the Mamluk commander Salman Reis with camels and provisions, facilitating the march of the Circassian troops toward the interior of the Tihāmah.".

The al-Zaylaʿī sheikhs combined the broader system of hereditary port administration. managed logistics and customs in Tihāmah ports including al-Luhayyah during the Ottoman era.

== Later History ==
By the late 18th century, during Carsten Niebuhr’s Danish Arabian Expedition (1761–1767), al-Luhayyah was a walled and fortified town still associated with the az-Zaylaʿī family as a "holy family," under local governor Emir Farhan.

== See also ==
- al-Luhayyah
- Tihāmah
- Zaylaʿ
- Tahirid Sultanate
- Mamluk Sultanate
