= Koyama (island) =

Island in Somalia

Koyama Island
- Location within Somalia

Geography
- Location: Somalia
- Coordinates: 0.6441°S 42.3331°E
- Archipelago: Bajuni Islands

Administration
- Somalia

Demographics
- Ethnic groups: Bajuni people

Koyama (also known as Kunyama Kundeeq) (also spelled Kwayama and Coiama) is an island in southern Somalia, in the region of Jubaland.

Koyama is the second largest island of the Bajuni Islands archipelago in the Somali sea, situated only 1.5 km (0.9 mi) from the mainland coast of Somalia. It is 5.3 km (3.3 mi) long and up to two kilometres (1.2 mi) wide, and features a large bay or lagoon opening towards the mainland coast. At 6.38 km^{2} (2.46 sq mi), it is almost equal in size to Chula, which measures 6.40 km^{2} (2.47 sq mi). Koyama island has two separate villages, Koyama and Koyamani. Koyama is rich in Swahili historic ruins and monuments such as pillar tombs.

== Demographics ==
Koyama Island, also known as Kooyame or Konyama Kundeeq, has been historically inhabited by the Koyama, a sub-clan of the Bajuni people. The Bajuni are a Swahili-speaking, Bantu-origin coastal community native to southern Somalia and the northern coast of Kenya. The island has served as one of their primary ancestral settlements for centuries.

The inhabitants traditionally belong to the Nowfali branch of the Bajuni and have maintained two main villages on the island: Koyama and Koyamani. They speak Kibajuni, a local dialect of Swahili, and have traditionally engaged in fishing, dhow-building, and small-scale trade.

Prior to the Somali civil war in the early 1990s, Koyama was home to a thriving Bajuni population. Following displacement during the conflict, the population of the island declined significantly, and fewer than twenty households remain today. Despite the reduced population, Koyama remains a culturally and historically significant site for the Bajuni people. The island contains Islamic ruins and pillar tombs that reflect its long-standing heritage.

== See also ==
- List of islands by name (K)
