= Sayyid Muhammad al-Barr =

Nineteenth-century governor of Zeila

Sayyid Muhammad al-Barr, also known as Syud Mahomed Bar, Sayyid Mohammed al-Barr, Sayyid Mohammed el Barr and Seid Muhammad Bar, was a nineteenth-century governor of Zeila, a port on the African coast of the Gulf of Aden. On 3 September 1840, he concluded a commercial treaty with Captain Robert Moresby of the East India Company.

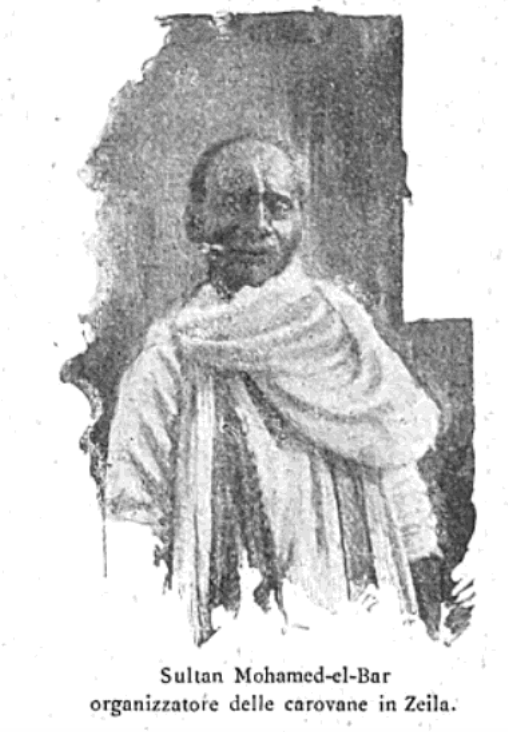
Photograph of Muhammad al-Barr taken by Luigi Robecchi Bricchetti's expedition to Harar.

The historian I. M. Lewis describes al-Barr as the hereditary holder of the governorship and the representative of an Ottoman pasha in western Arabia. Mohamed Osman Omar identifies him as commander-in-chief of the forces of the Sharif of Mocha and as head of the Arab tribes inhabiting Zeila, referring to him in the same passage as an Arab chief.

Al-Barr was succeeded by the Somali merchant and political leader Sharmarke Ali Saleh in 1848. Al-Barr nevertheless remained a respected figure in Zeila and was encountered there by Burton in the mid-1850s. Sharmarke was later also succeeded as Governor of Zeila by Abu Bakr Pasha, a local Afar statesman.

== History ==
Al-Barr's name appears in several forms because nineteenth-century writers followed different systems for the romanisation of Arabic. The 1840 treaty and the later India Office memorandum use the form “Syud Mahomed Bar”. Burton refers to him as both “Sayyid Mohammed al-Barr” and “Sayyid Mohammed el Barr”, while Omar uses “Seid Muhammad Bar” and “Seid Muhammad El Bar”. Lewis uses the form “Sayyid Muhammad al-Barr”.

The modern scholar Samson A. Bezabeh renders his name as “Sayyid Muhammad al-Bār” and mentions him as a former governor of Zeila in a study of Yemeni migration and Sayyid families in the Horn of Africa.

The honorific Sayyid consistently forms part of his name in the principal sources. Burton, who encountered him after his governorship had ended, wrote that al-Barr remained highly respected by the inhabitants of Zeila because of his pedigree.

Omar provides the clearest description of al-Barr's communal position, identifying him as the head of the Arab tribes inhabiting Zeila and referring to him as an Arab chief. Elsewhere, he again describes al-Barr as head of the Arab tribes near Zeila and as commander-in-chief of the forces at Mocha.

=== Governorship of Zeila ===
During the first half of the 19th century, Zeila was an important commercial outlet linking Harar and the interior of the Horn of Africa with Aden, Mocha and other Arabian ports. The governor administered the town's customs and commerce while remaining connected to rulers and officials based on the Yemeni side of the Gulf of Aden.

Lewis writes that, following the decline of the Adal Sultanate, Zeila and, to a lesser extent, Berbera came under the authority of the sharifs of Mocha and were at times nominally incorporated into the Ottoman Empire. He describes al-Barr as the hereditary governor of Zeila and the representative of the Ottoman pasha in western Arabia.

Burton similarly states that Zeila had passed under the authority of the Sharif of Mocha, who possessed the power to remove its governor. He also indicates that the al-Barr family held recognised rights over the town before the governorship passed to Sharmarke.

Al-Barr also held an important position at Mocha. Omar describes him as commander-in-chief of the Sharif of Mocha's army. According to Omar, Captain Moresby initially reported that Zeila was dependent upon Mocha, from which its governor and armed forces were sent. Moresby therefore travelled to Mocha, where he negotiated with the Sharif and al-Barr.

=== Treaty with the East India Company ===
British interest in the African coast opposite Aden increased after the British occupation of Aden in 1839. Captain Robert Moresby subsequently negotiated commercial agreements with the rulers of Tadjoura and Zeila. On 3 September 1840, acting on behalf of the East India Company, he concluded a treaty with al-Barr at Mocha.

The agreement allowed British vessels and merchants to enter and trade at Zeila and at other ports under the governor's authority. Goods were made subject to a customs duty of five per cent, while al-Barr agreed to encourage British trade with the interior and to protect British merchants, agents and property.

Al-Barr also undertook not to conclude a treaty with another European power, permit Europeans to settle in his territories or allow large European parties to travel through them without first informing the British authorities at Aden.

A further article transferred the island called Aubad, near Zeila, to the British government for use as a harbour for British vessels. Omar renders the island's name as Aybat in one passage and Aubad in another.

The treaty provides the strongest surviving contemporary evidence of al-Barr's position as governor, recording his authority over Zeila's trade, customs, ports and foreign relations.

=== Transfer of power to Sharmarke Ali Saleh ===
Al-Barr was eventually replaced by Sharmarke Ali Saleh, a wealthy Somali merchant with commercial connections to Berbera, Zeila, Aden and Mocha. The sources differ over the date and exact form of the transfer.

Lewis states that Sharmarke obtained the office from its hereditary holder around 1840. Omar gives a more detailed sequence, stating that al-Barr obtained possession of Zeila in 1838, sold his rights to Sharmarke, later recovered the town and broke its allegiance to Mocha. According to Omar, Zeila returned to Mocha's authority in 1847 with Sharmarke as its ruler.

Omar further states that the Turkish governor of Mocha and Hodeida formally farmed Zeila to Sharmarke in 1848. Burton adds that Sharmarke paid al-Barr an annual sum of 750 crowns at Mocha and retained the revenue collected above that amount.

=== Later life ===
Al-Barr remained a prominent figure in Zeila after losing the governorship. Burton encountered him during his stay in the town in 1854–1855 and described him as a stout former governor who continued to be highly respected because of his pedigree.

Burton also records that al-Barr attended gatherings alongside the jurist Faqih Adan, during which religious, political and historical subjects were discussed. This suggests that al-Barr continued to participate in the intellectual and social life of Zeila after leaving office.

His financial connections with Mocha also continued. The annual payment of 750 crowns made by Sharmarke indicates that al-Barr or his family retained a recognised financial interest in Zeila after the transfer of political authority. The available sources do not establish whether al-Barr lived permanently in Mocha, remained in Zeila or travelled between the two ports.

== See also ==
- Zeila
- Ottoman Zeila
- Sharmarke Ali Saleh
- Mocha, Yemen
- History of Somaliland
