= Chovaye =

Island of Somalia

Coordinates: 0.872°S 42.157°E

Chovaye is an island that is a part of the Bajuni Islands archipelago in southern Somalia. in the Somali Sea. It does not have a permanent population, but rather only migratory fishermen. It is also called Tovai.

== See also ==
- Bajuni Islands
