= Bajuni Islands =

Somali archipelago in the Indian Ocean

- Bajuni Islands (Somalia)

Geography
- Total islands: 9
- Major islands: Chandra, Chovaye, Chula, Koyama, Darakasi, Ngumi

Administration
- Somalia

Demographics
- Ethnic groups: Bajuni people

The Bajuni Islands (Somali: Jasiiradaha Jubbada Hoose; Arabic: جزر باجوني; Italian: Isole Giuba, also known as the Bajun Islands or Baajun Islands) are an archipelago in southern Somalia. They are situated in the Somali sea off the southern coast of Jubaland, from Kismayo to Ras Kamboni.

== Geography ==
Administratively, the islands are within the Lower Juba region of Somalia.

There are six main islands:

- Chandra (2.95 km²),
- Chovaye (also spelled Tovai; 0.8720°S 42.1593°E) (5.46 km²),
- Chula (also spelled Tula; 1.0052°S 42.0364°E) (1.99 km²),
- Koyama (6.38 km²),
- Darakasi (1.99 km²) and
- Ngumi (2.56 km²).

Chula, where the village of Ndowa is situated, is the only island with a significant population

In addition, there are several smaller islands, including Kandha Iwu, Fuma, and Ilisi. The island of Kismayo was attached to the coast in 1961 during the construction of Kismayo Port.

== History ==
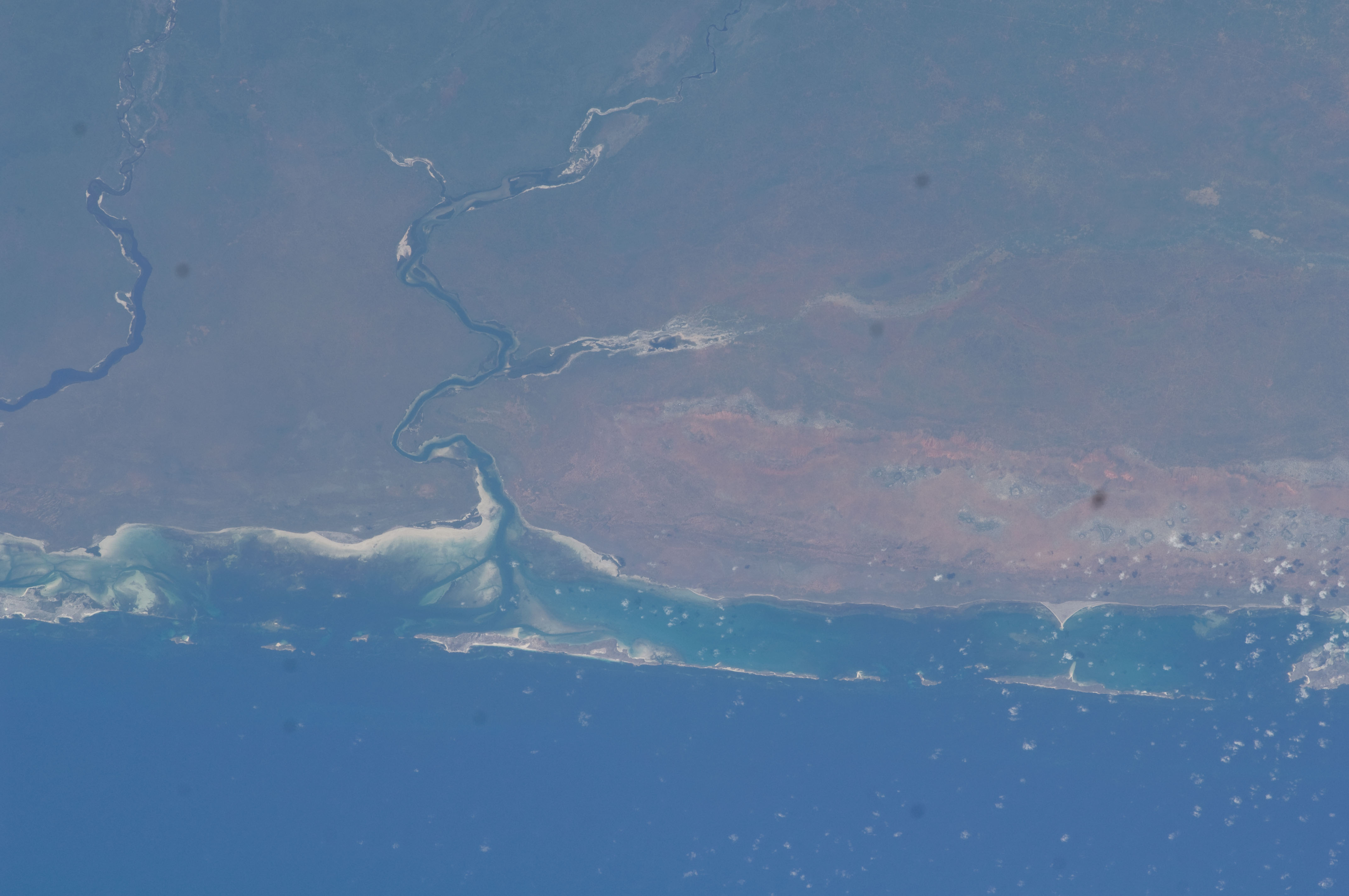
The Bajuni Islands chain extending along the southern Somali coast near Kismayo, viewed from the International Space Station in 2009.

The islands were part of the ancient Somali empires, merchants, and fishermen who used it as an offshoot to trade with other civilizations in the spice world. The Somali Ajuran Dynasty utilized it for centuries as part of their kingdom. After the decline of several Somali empires later, the islands became less inhabited until the colonial invasion by the British East Africa prior to World War I. The Bajuni Islands formed a constituent part of British Jubaland. In 1924, mainland Jubaland was ceded to Italy, while the Bajuni Islands were transferred two years later.

According to C. Wightwick Haywood, a British official in Kismayo who visited the islands in 1913, the only inhabited islands in the chain were Chovaye and Chula. Maize, millet, sweet potatoes and coconuts were grown on the islands, and dhows were used for transportation. While there, Haywood saw ruins of what he described as a "fair-sized town" on Chovaye. He mentioned that similar stone scrollwork could also be seen on houses in the Lamu Islands. Haywood thought some of the residents to be of Arab or Persian descent.

== Demographics ==
The islands are today mainly inhabited by the eponymous Bajuni people.

== See also ==
- List of islands in the Indian Ocean
- Saad ad-Din Islands
