= Aibat =

Aibat island
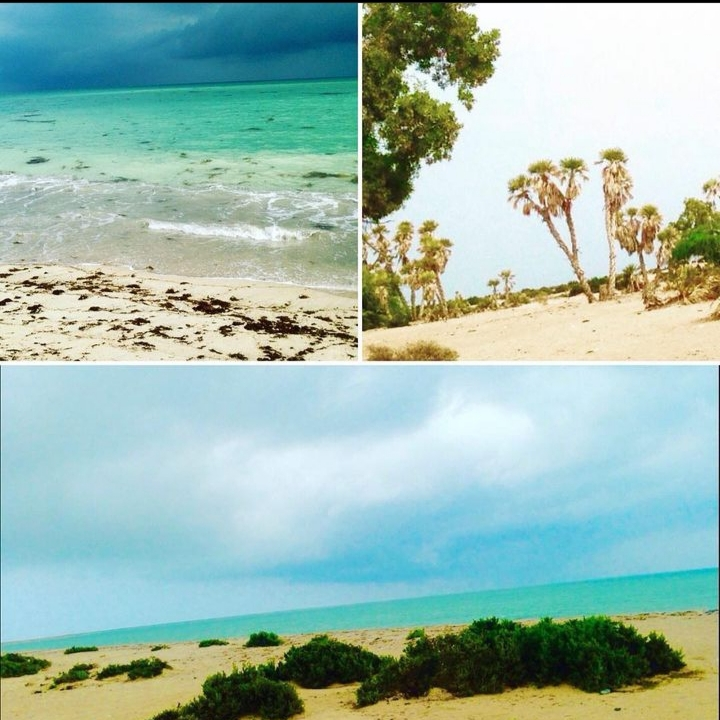
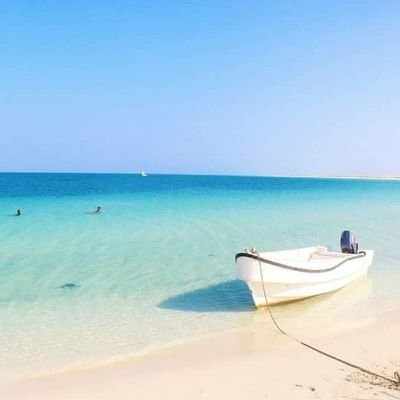

- Location within Awdal Location within Somaliland

Geography
- Location: Somaliland
- Coordinates: From 11.503°N 43.4575°E to 11°21′N 43°28′E
- Archipelago: Zeila Archipelago

Administration
- Somaliland

Demographics
- Ethnic groups: Uninhabited

Aibat (Somali: Ceebaad) is the second-largest of the six islands of the Zeila Archipelago. It has a lighthouse. It is a low and sandy island, with bushes, that is around 1.75 miles in length and around 0.55 miles in breadth. It is mostly surrounded by a reef. The island has an area of 1.58 square kilometers (158 hectares) and is located 1.9 kilometers north of Sacadin Island, the largest of the group, and about 21 kilometers east of the Djibouti border.

== See also ==
- Administrative divisions of Somaliland
- Regions of Somaliland
- Districts of Somaliland
- Sacadin
