= Sacadin =

Largest island of Somaliland

Sa'ad ad-Din island
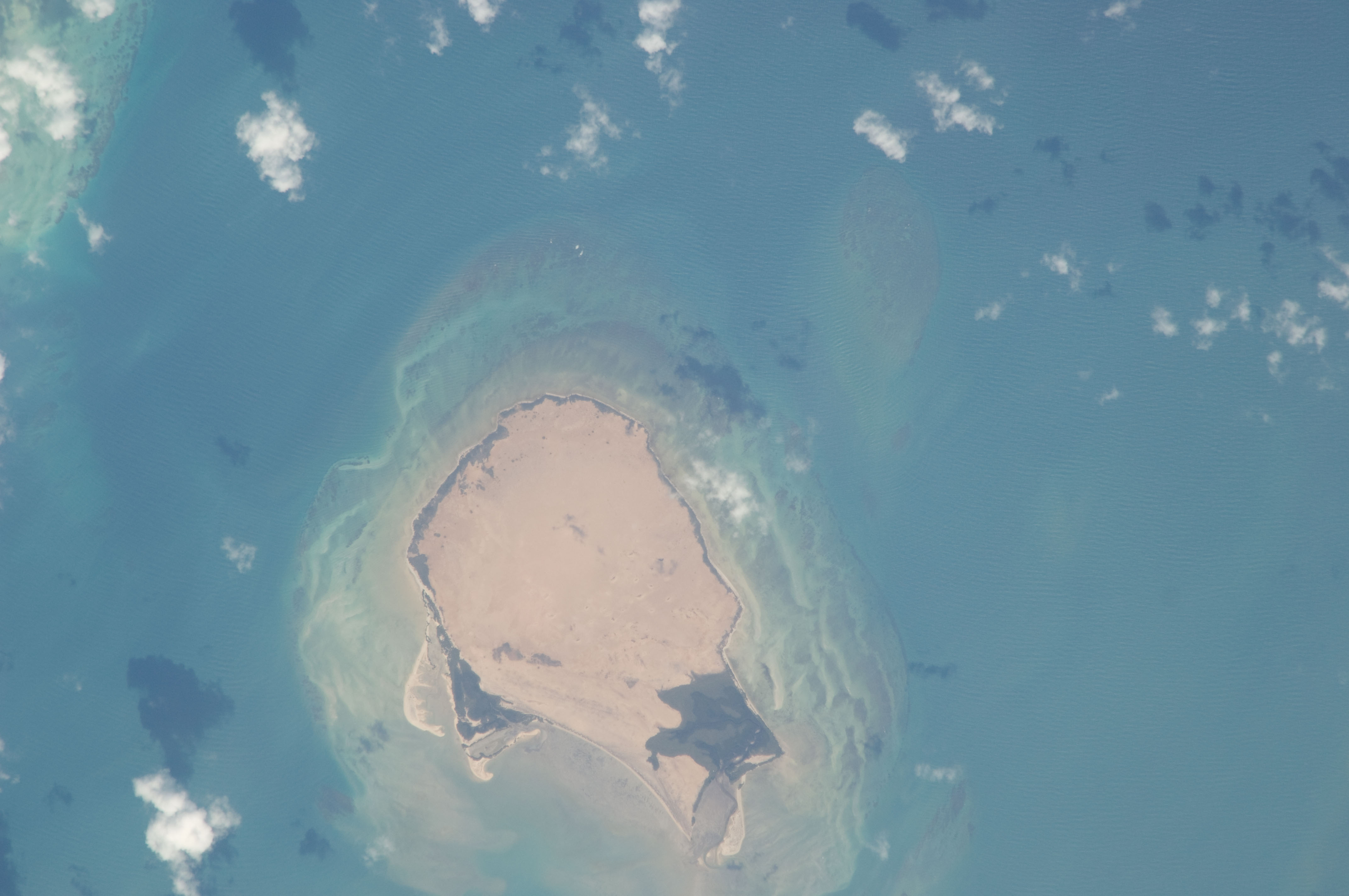

- Location within Awdal Location within Somaliland

Geography
- Location: Somaliland
- Coordinates: From 11.4363°N 43.4629°E to 11°21′N 43°28′E
- Archipelago: Zeila Archipelago

Administration
- Somaliland

Demographics
- Ethnic groups: Uninhabited

Sacadin is the largest of the six Somaliland islands of the Zeila Archipelago, off the coast of Somaliland. It has an area of 7.2 square kilometers (about 720 hectares) and is mostly desert, although 2 portions of the island have abundant vegetation. It is 11.5 kilometers long and is located 5.4 kilometers north of the coast of Somaliland, near the border with Djibouti.

Its surface area is comparatively larger than that of Gibraltar and 3 times that of Monaco.

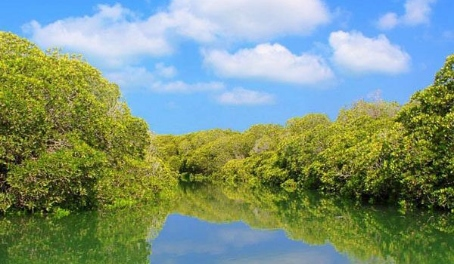
Mangrove vegetation on Sa'ad ad-Din Island, the largest island in the Zeila Archipelago.

== See also ==
- Administrative divisions of Somalia
- Regions of Somalia
- Districts of Somalia
- Aibat
