= Zeila =

Zeila Saylac (Somali) زيلع (Arabic)
- Town
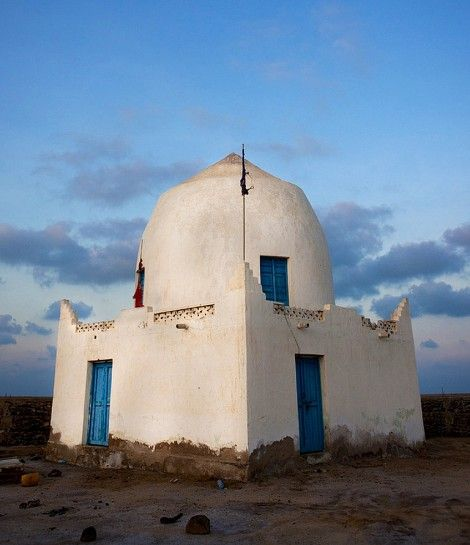
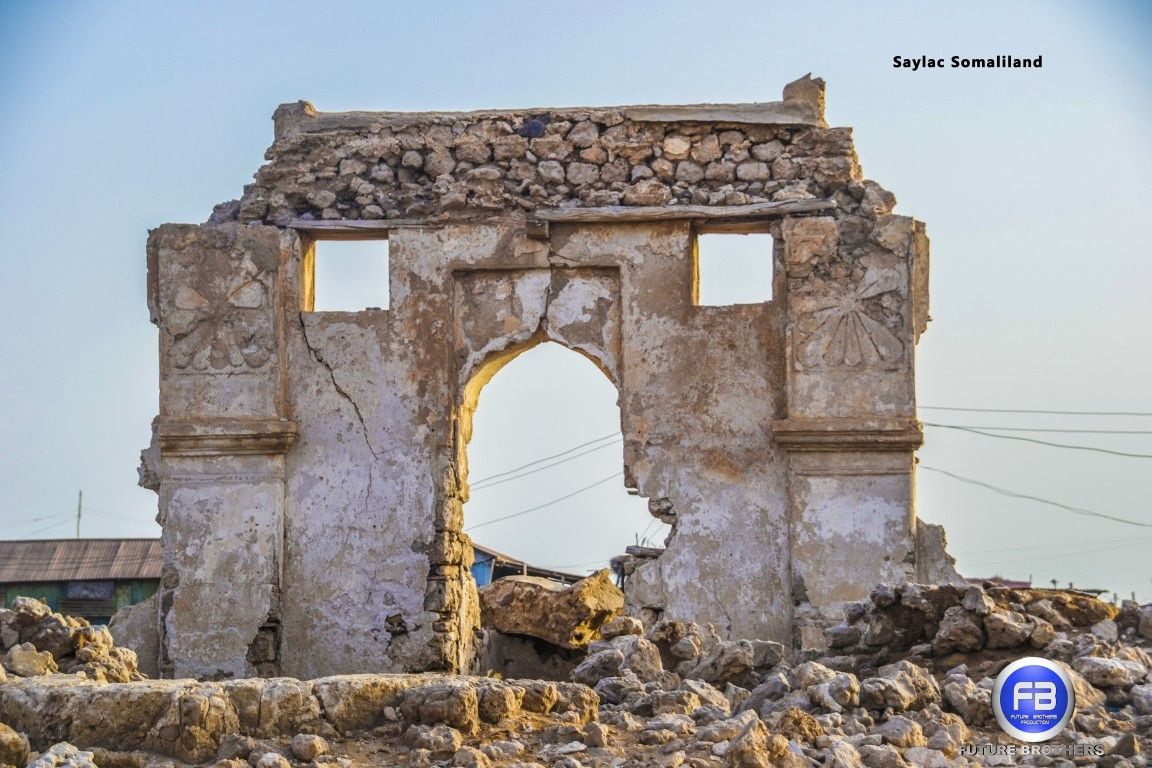
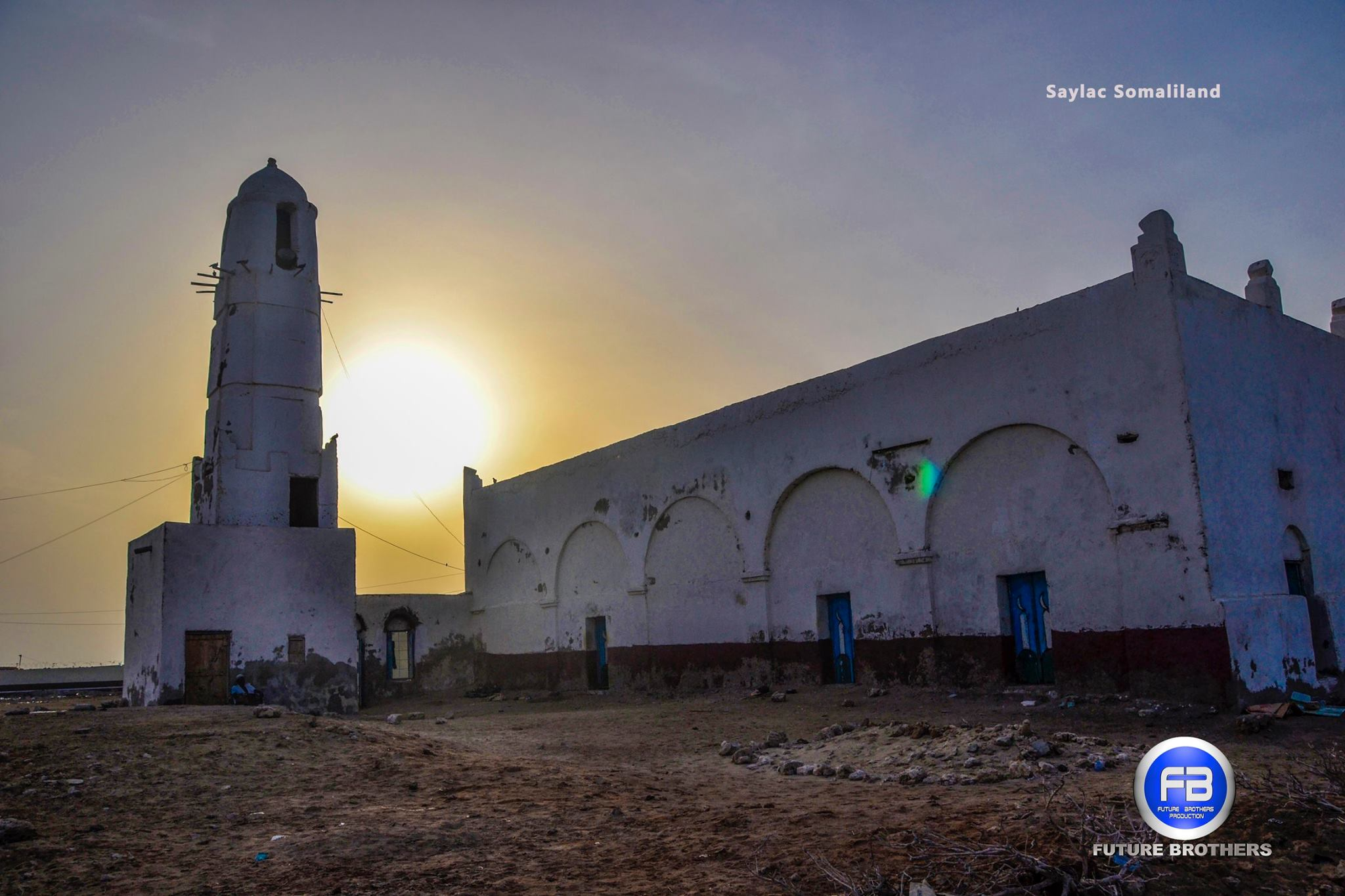
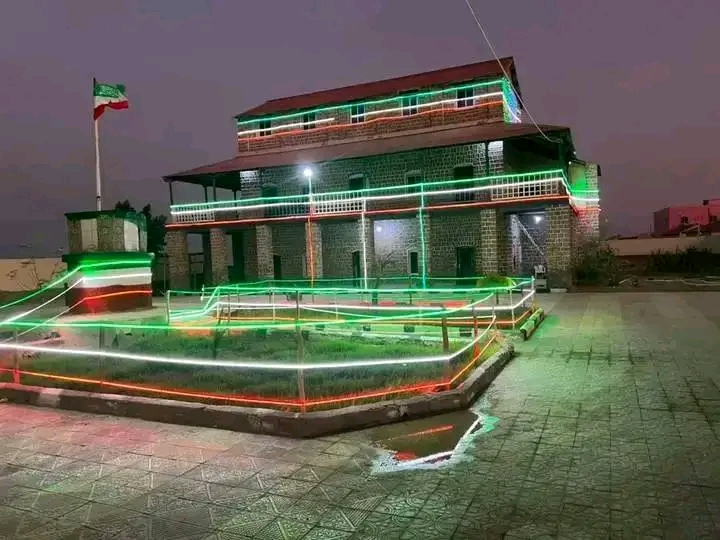
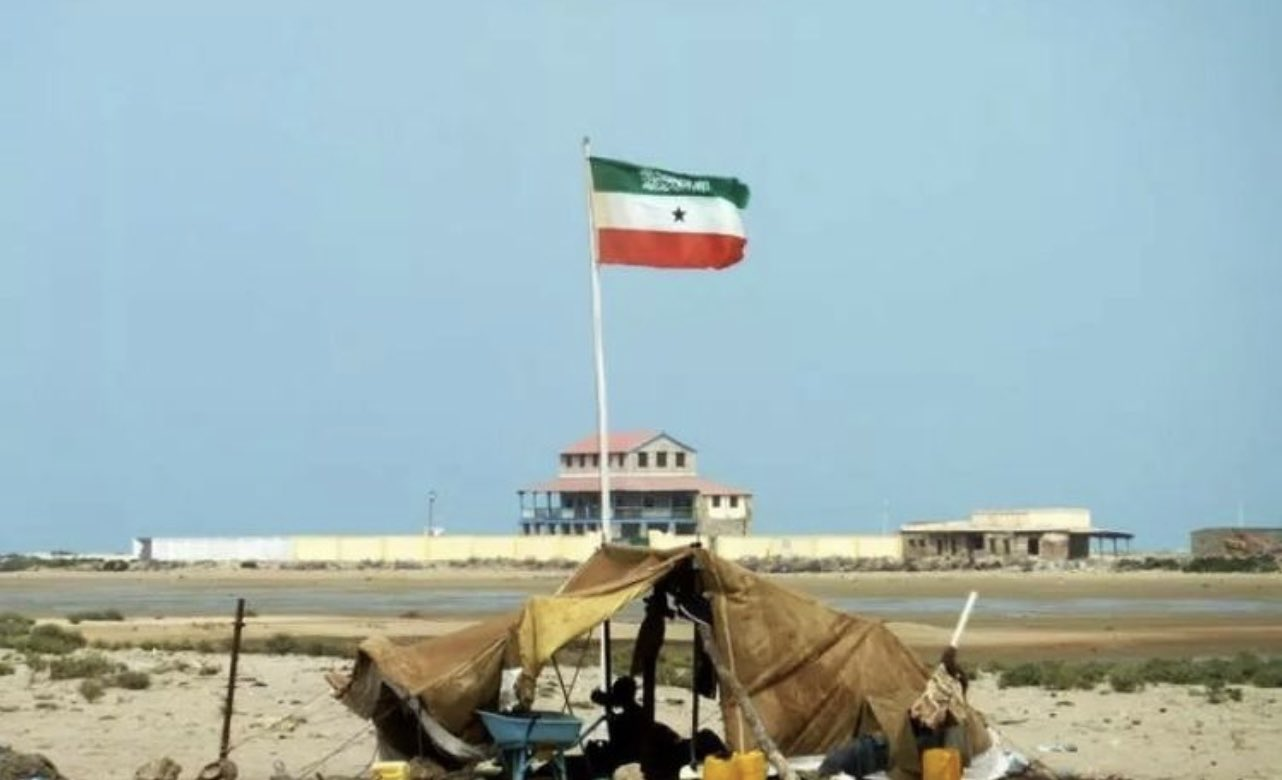
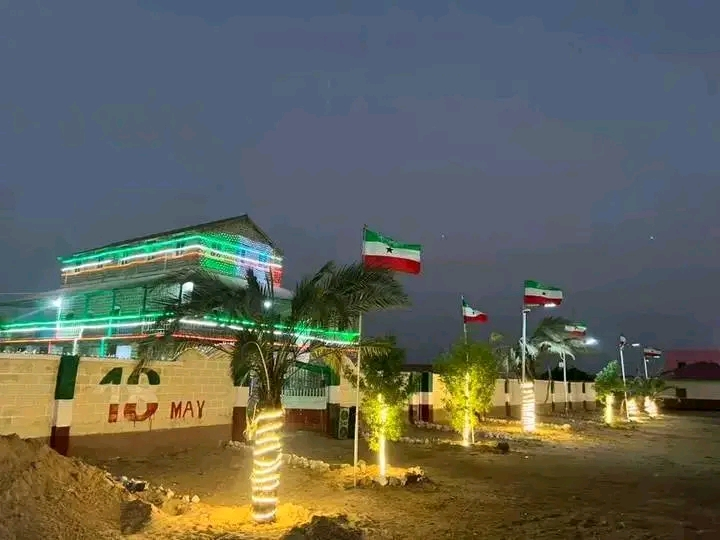

- Location in Somaliland Zeila (Somaliland) Zeila (Horn of Africa)
- Coordinates: 11°21′14″N 43°28′23″E
- Country: Somaliland
- Region: Awdal
- District: Zeila District
- Established: ca. 1st century CE

Population (2012)
  - Total: 18,600
- Time zone: UTC+3 (EAT)
- Climate: BWh

Zeila (Somali: Saylac, Arabic: زيلع, romanized: Zayla), also spelled Zaila or Zayla, is a historical port town in the western Awdal region of Somaliland.

In the Middle Ages, the Jewish traveller Benjamin of Tudela identified Zeila with the Biblical location of Havilah. Most modern scholars identify it with the site of Avalites mentioned in the 1st-century Greco-Roman travelogue the Periplus of the Erythraean Sea and in Ptolemy, although this is disputed. The town evolved into an early Islamic center with the arrival of Muslims shortly after the Hijrah. By the 9th century, Zeila was the capital of the early Adal Kingdom and Ifat Sultanate in the 13th century, it would attain its height of prosperity a few centuries later in the 16th century. The city subsequently was under Ottoman protection from the 16th to the 19th century, during which it was briefly seized by Sharmarke Ali Saleh in 1856. It later transitioned from Ottoman to British control.

Up until recently Zeila was surrounded by a large wall with five gates: Bab al-Sahil and Bab al-Jadd on the North. Bab Abdulqadir on the East: Bab al-Sahil on the west and Bab Ashurbura on the south.

Historically, Zeila was a cosmopolitan port city inhabited by various ethnic groups such as Somalis, Afars and Arabs. The town of Zeila and the wider Zeila District is currently inhabited by the Gadabuursi and Issa, both subclans of the Dir clan family.

The Issa clan regard Zeila as their traditional home, having historic ties to the town, serving as the site where their Ughaz is crowned. It was also viewed as the seat of the Gadabursi Ughazate, where the French and British signed treaties with them.

== Geography ==
Zeila is situated in the Awdal region in Somaliland. Located on the Gulf of Aden coast near the Djibouti border, the town sits on a sandy spit surrounded by the sea. It is known for its coral reef, mangroves and offshore islands, which include the Sa'ad ad-Din archipelago named after the Sultan Sa'ad ad-Din II of the Sultanate of Ifat. Landward, the terrain is unbroken desert for some fifty miles. Borama lies 151 miles (243 km) southeast of Zeila, Berbera lies 170 miles (270 km) east of Zeila, while the city of Harar in Ethiopia is 200 miles (320 km) to the west. The Zeila region named after this port city denoted the entire Muslim inhabited domains in medieval Horn of Africa.

== Foundation ==
Zeila, along with Mogadishu and other Somali coastal cities, was founded upon an indigenous network involving hinterland trade, which happened even before significant Arab migrations or trade with the Somali coast. That goes back approximately four thousand years.

According to textual and archeological evidence, Zeila, was founded by Sh. Saylici was one of many small towns developed by the Somali pastoral and trading communities which flourished through the trade that gave birth to other coastal and hinterland towns such as Heis, Maydh, Abasa, Awbare, Awbube, Amud in the Borama area, Derbiga Cad Cad, Qoorgaab, Fardowsa, Maduna, Aw-Barkhadle in the Hargeisa region and Fardowsa, near Sheikh.

Ancient Zeila was divided into five residential districts; Khoor-Doobi, Hafat al-Furda, Asho Bara, Hafat al-Suda and Sarrey.

== History ==
=== Avalites ===
Zeila is an ancient city and has been identified with the trade post referred to in classical antiquity as Avalites (Greek: Αβαλίτες), situated in the region of Barbara in Northeast Africa. During antiquity, it was one of many city-states that engaged in the lucrative trade between the Near East (Phoenicia, Ptolemaic Egypt, Greece, Parthian Persia, Saba, Nabataea, Roman Empire, etc.) and India. Merchants used the ancient Somali maritime vessel known as the beden to transport their cargo.

In Camoens: His Life and Lusiads, Richard F. Burton links the Somali Habr Awal people with the ancient Avalitae mentioned by Ptolemy and in the Periplus of the Erythraean Sea. He notes that Camoens’ reference to the “Barbarica Region” corresponds to the Somali coast, and following Ibn Battuta and Varthema, He identifies this group with the Habr Awal, whom he noted as occupying the coastal region between Zeila and Siyara

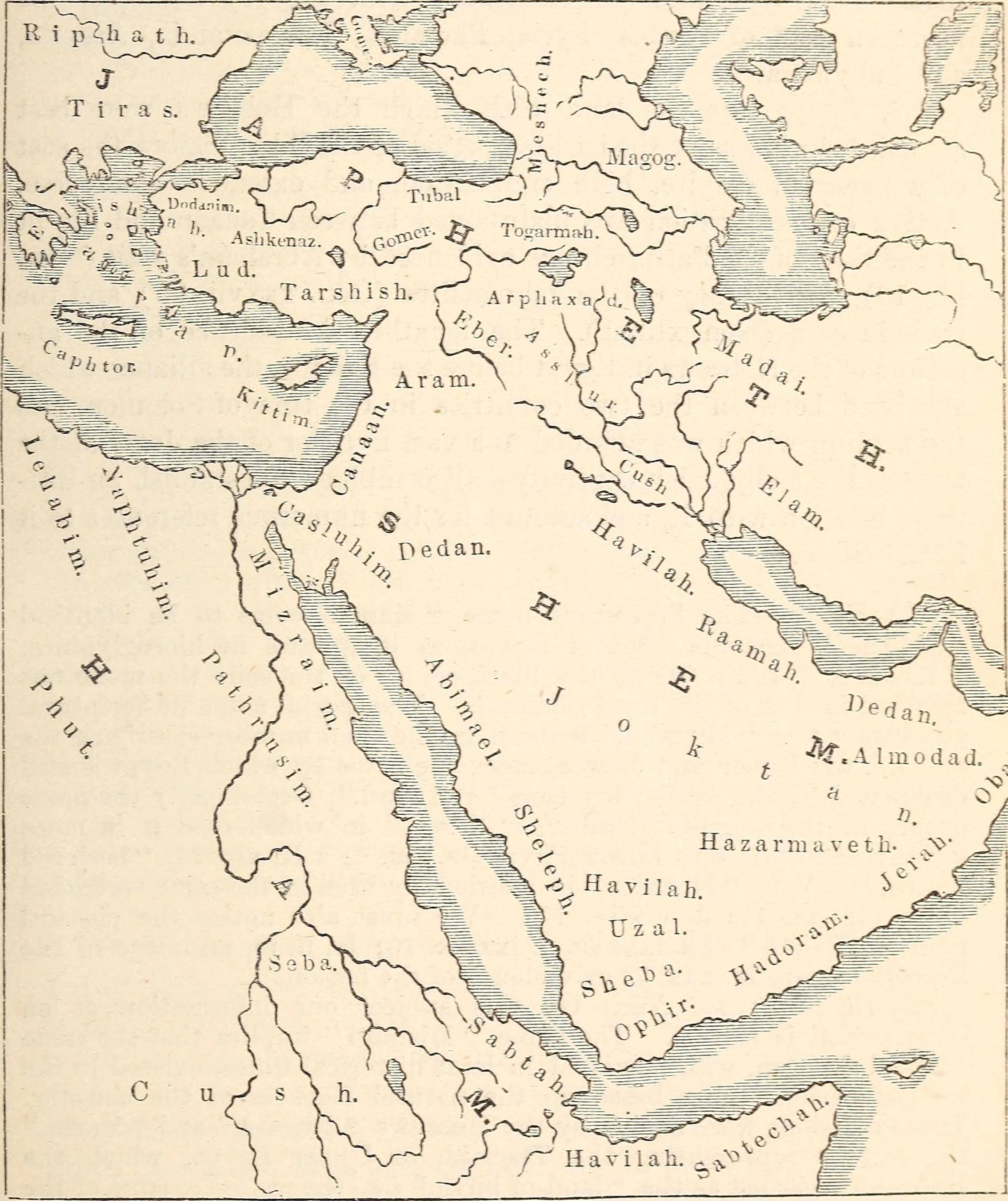
Several locations for Havilah are shown, including the Zeila region

Along with the neighboring Habash of Al-Habash to the west, the Barbaroi who inhabited the area were recorded in the 1st century CE Greek document the Periplus of the Erythraean Sea as engaging in extensive commercial exchanges with Egypt and pre-Islamic Arabia. The travelogue mentions the Barbaroi trading frankincense, among various other commodities, through their port cities such as Avalites. Competent seamen, the Periplus' author also indicates that they sailed throughout the Red Sea and Gulf of Aden for trade. The document describes the Barbaroi's governance system as decentralized and essentially consisting of a collection of autonomous city-states. It also suggests that "the Berbers who live in the place are very unruly," an apparent reference to their independent nature.

=== Ifat & Adal Sultanates ===
Islam was introduced to the area early on from the Arabian Peninsula, shortly after the Hijrah. Zeila's two-mihrab Masjid al-Qiblatayn dates to the 7th century, and is the oldest mosque in the city. In the late 9th century, Al-Yaqubi wrote that Muslims were living along the northern Somali seaboard. He also mentioned that the Adal kingdom had its capital in the city, suggesting that the Adal Sultanate with Zeila as its headquarters dates back to at least the 9th or 10th centuries. According to I.M. Lewis, the polity was governed by local dynasties consisting of Somalized Arabs or Arabized Somalis, who also ruled over the similarly established Sultanate of Mogadishu in the Benadir region to the south. Adal's history from this founding period would be characterized by a succession of battles with neighbouring Abyssinia.

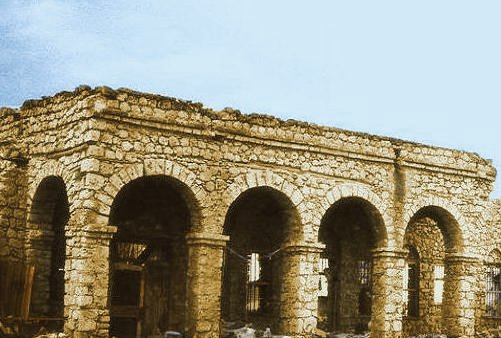
Ruins of the Muslim Sultanate of Adal in Zeila, Somaliland

By the years (1214–17), Ibn Said referred to both Zeila and Berbera. Zeila, as he tells us, was a wealthy city of considerable size and its inhabitants were completely Muslim. Ibn Said's description gives the impression that Berbera was of much more localized importance, mainly serving the immediate Somali hinterland while Zeila was clearly serving more extensive areas. But there is no doubt that Zeila was also predominantly Somali, and Al-Dimashqi, another thirteen-century Arab writer, gives the city name its Somali name Awdal (Adal), still known among the local Somali. By the fourteen century, the significance of this Somali port for the Ethiopian interior increased so much so that all the Muslim communities established along the trade routes into central and south-eastern Ethiopia were commonly known in Egypt and Syria by the collective term of "the country of Zeila."

Historian Al-Umari in his study in the 1340s about the history of Awdal, the medieval state in western and northern parts of historical Somalia and some related areas, Al-Umari of Cairo states that in the land of Zayla’ (Awdal) “they cultivate two times annually by seasonal rains … The rainfall for the winter is called ‘Bil’ and rainfall for the ‘summer’ is called ‘Karam’ in the language of the people of Zayla’ [Awdali Somalis].”

The author’s description about seasons generally corresponds to the local seasons in historical Awdal where Karan or Karam is an important rainy season at the beginning of the year. The second half of the year is called ‘Bilo Dirir’ (Bil = month; Bilo = months). It appears that the historian was referring, in one way or another, to these still used terms, Karan and Bil. This indicates that the ancient Somali and/or Harari solar calendar citizens of Zeila were using was very similar to the one they use today.

In the following century, the Moroccan historian and traveller Ibn Battuta describes the city being inhabited by Somalis, followers of the Shafi‘i school, who kept large numbers of camels, sheep and goats. His description thus indicates both the ingenious nature of the city, as indicated by the composition of its population, and, by implication through the presence of the livestock, the existence of the nomads in its vicinity. He also describes Zeila as a big metropolis city and many great markets filled with many wealthy merchants. Zeila has also been known to be home to a number of Hanafis, but no research has been conducted as to how large the Hanafi population was in premodern Zeila.

Through extensive trade with Abyssinia and Arabia, Adal attained its height of prosperity during the 14th century. It sold incense, myrrh, slaves, gold, silver and camels, among many other commodities. Zeila had by then started to grow into a huge multicultural metropolis, with Somalis (Predominantly), Afar, Harari, and even Arabs and Persian inhabitants. The city was also instrumental in bringing Islam to the Oromo and other Ethiopian ethnic groups.

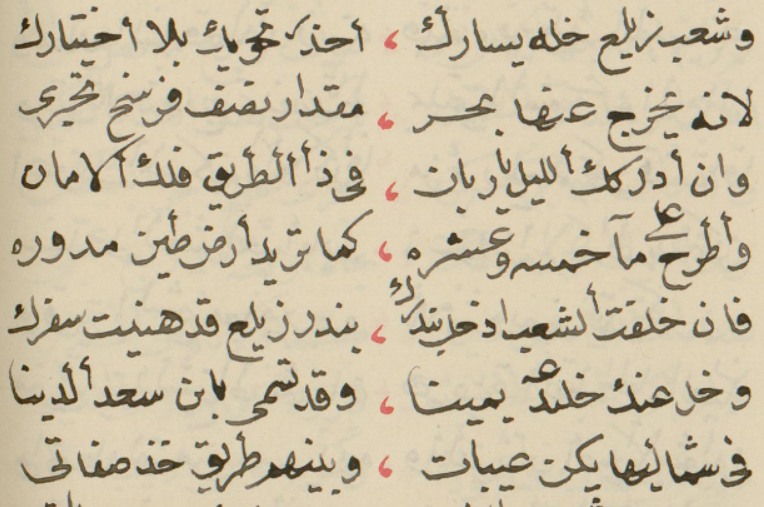
Ibn Majid's notes on Zeila and the Sa'ad ad-Din islands

In 1332, the Zeila-based King of Adal was slain in a military campaign aimed at halting the Abyssinian Emperor Amda Seyon's march toward the city. When the last Sultan of Ifat, Sa'ad ad-Din II, was also killed by Dawit I of Ethiopia in Zeila in 1410, his children escaped to Yemen, before later returning in 1415. In the early 15th century, Adal's capital was moved further inland to the town of Dakkar, where Sabr ad-Din II, the eldest son of Sa'ad ad-Din II, established a new base after his return from Yemen. Adal's headquarters were again relocated the following century, this time to Harar. From this new capital, Adal organised an effective army led by Imam Ahmad ibn Ibrahim al-Ghazi (Ahmad "Gurey" or "Gran") that invaded the Abyssinian empire. This campaign is historically known as the Conquest of Abyssinia (Futuh al Habash). During the war, Imam Ahmad pioneered the use of cannons supplied by the Ottoman Empire, which he imported through Zeila and deployed against Abyssinian forces and their Portuguese allies led by Cristóvão da Gama. Some scholars argue that this conflict proved, through their use on both sides, the value of firearms like the matchlock musket, cannons and the arquebus over traditional weapons.

I. M. Lewis gives an invaluable reference to an Arabic manuscript on the history of the Gadabuursi Somali. ‘This Chronicle opens’, Lewis tells us, ‘with an account of the wars of Imam ‘Ali Si’id (d. 1392) from whom the Gadabuursi today trace their descent, and who is described as the only Muslim leader fighting on the western flank in the armies of Se’ad ad-Din, ruler of Zeila.

I. M. Lewis (1959) states:

"Further light on the Dir advance and Galla withdrawal seems to be afforded by an Arabic manuscript describing the history of the Gadabursi clan. This chronicle opens with an account of the wars of Imam ‘Ali Si’id (d. 1392), from whom the Gadabursi today trace their descent and who is described as the only Muslim leader fighting on the Western flank in the armies of Sa'd ad-Din (d. 1415), ruler of Zeila."

Legendary Arab explorer Ahmad ibn Mājid wrote of Zeila and other notable landmarks and ports of the northern Somali coast during the Adal Sultanate period, including Berbera, Siyara, the Sa'ad ad-Din islands aka the Zeila Archipelago, El-Sheikh, Alula, Ruguda, Maydh, Heis and El-Darad.

The influence of Zeila extended across the Red Sea to the Sheikhdom of al-Luhayya, a polity founded by migrants from Zeila.

Travellers' reports, such as the memoirs of the Italian Ludovico di Varthema, indicate that Zeila continued to be an important marketplace during the 16th century, despite being sacked by the Portuguese in 1517 and 1528. Later that century, separate raids by nomads from the interior eventually prompted the port's then ruler, Garad Lado, to enlist the services of 'Atlya ibn Muhammad to construct a sturdy wall around the city. Incited by the Garad of Sim, during the Adal civil war, the city would be sacked by a Somali clan which damaged its walls. Zeila, however, ultimately began to decline in importance following the short-lived conquest of Abyssinia.

=== Early Modern Period ===
16th-century Zeila, along with several other settlements on the East African coast, had been visited by the Portuguese explorer and writer Duarte Barbosa, describing the city as such: "Having passed this town of Berbara, and going on, entering the Red Sea, there is another town of the Moors, which is named Zeyla, which is a good place of trade, whither many ships navigate and sell their clothes and merchandise. It is very populous, with good houses of stone and white-wash and good streets; the houses are covered with terraces, the dwellers in them are black. They have many horses and breed many cattle of all sorts, which they use for milk, butter, and meat. There is in this country abundance of wheat, millet, barley, and fruits, which they carry thence to Aden."

Beginning in 1630, the city became a dependency of the ruler of Mocha, who, for a small sum, leased the port to one of the office-holders of Mocha. The latter, in return, collected a toll on its trade. Zeila was subsequently ruled by an Emir, whom Mordechai Abir suggested had "some vague claim to authority over all of the Sahil, but whose real authority did not extend very far beyond the walls of the town." Assisted by cannons and a few mercenaries armed with matchlocks, the governor succeeded in fending off incursions by both the disunited nomads of the interior, who had penetrated the area, as well as brigands in the Gulf of Aden. By the first half of the 19th century, Zeila was a shadow of its former self, having been reduced to "a large village surrounded by a low mud wall, with a population that varied according to the season from 1,000 to 3,000 people." The city continued to serve as the principal maritime outlet for Harar and beyond it in Shewa. However, the opening of a new sea route between Tadjoura and Shewa cut further into Zeila's historical position as the main regional port.

=== Haji Sharmarke and Pre Colonial Period ===
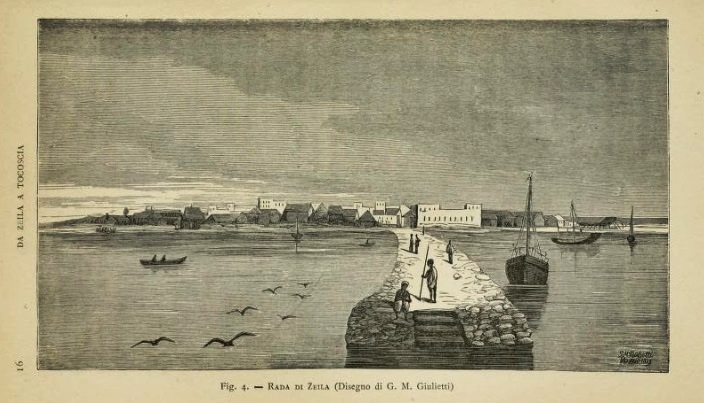
Zeila in 1877, by an Italian visitor

Richard Burton explicitly described the Gadabursi as inhabiting the lands immediately to the east and northeast of Harar, and extending their domain to the neighbourhood of Zayla. The Habar Awal clan were present along the seaboard ranging between Zayla and Siyaro, primarily in the coastal towns of Bulhar and Berbera. This was further emphasised in an earlier account by Lieutenant C. J. Cruttenden in 1848 in which he stated that Habar Awal established themselves from the lowlands of Zeyla to Berbera According to British government sources, The Issa live along the south side of Ghoubbet el-Kharab, and from thence to Zeila, the coast being referred to as Bhur Essah, or Essahi.

Before this, it was the Sharifs of Mocha who exercised nominal rule on behalf of the Ottoman Empire over Zeila. Hajji Sharmarke Ali Saleh came to govern Zeila after the Turkish governor of Mocha and Hodeida handed governorship from Mohamed El-Barr to him. Mohamed El Barr would not leave peacefully and Sharmarke departed for Zeila with a contingent of fifty Somali musketeers and two cannons. Arriving outside the city, he instructed his men to fire the cannons close to the walls. Intimidated and not having seen such weapons before, El-Barr and his men would flee and leave Zeila for Sharmarke. Sharmarke's governorship had an instant effect on the city, as he maneuvered to monopolize as much of the regional trade as possible, with his sights set as far as Harar and the Ogaden. In 1845, he deployed a few matchlock men to wrest control of neighboring Berbera from that town's then feuding Somali authorities. The Emir of Harar Ahmad III ibn Abu Bakr already been at loggerheads with Sharmarke over fiscal matters. He was concerned about the ramifications that these movements might ultimately have on his own city's commerce. The Emir consequently urged Berbera's leaders to reconcile and mount a resistance against Sharmarke's troops in 1852. Sharmarke was later succeeded as Governor of Zeila by Abu Bakr Pasha, a local Afar statesman in 1855 but would return and depose Abu Bakr in 1857 before finally being ousted in 1861 after Sharmarke's implication in the death of a French Consul.

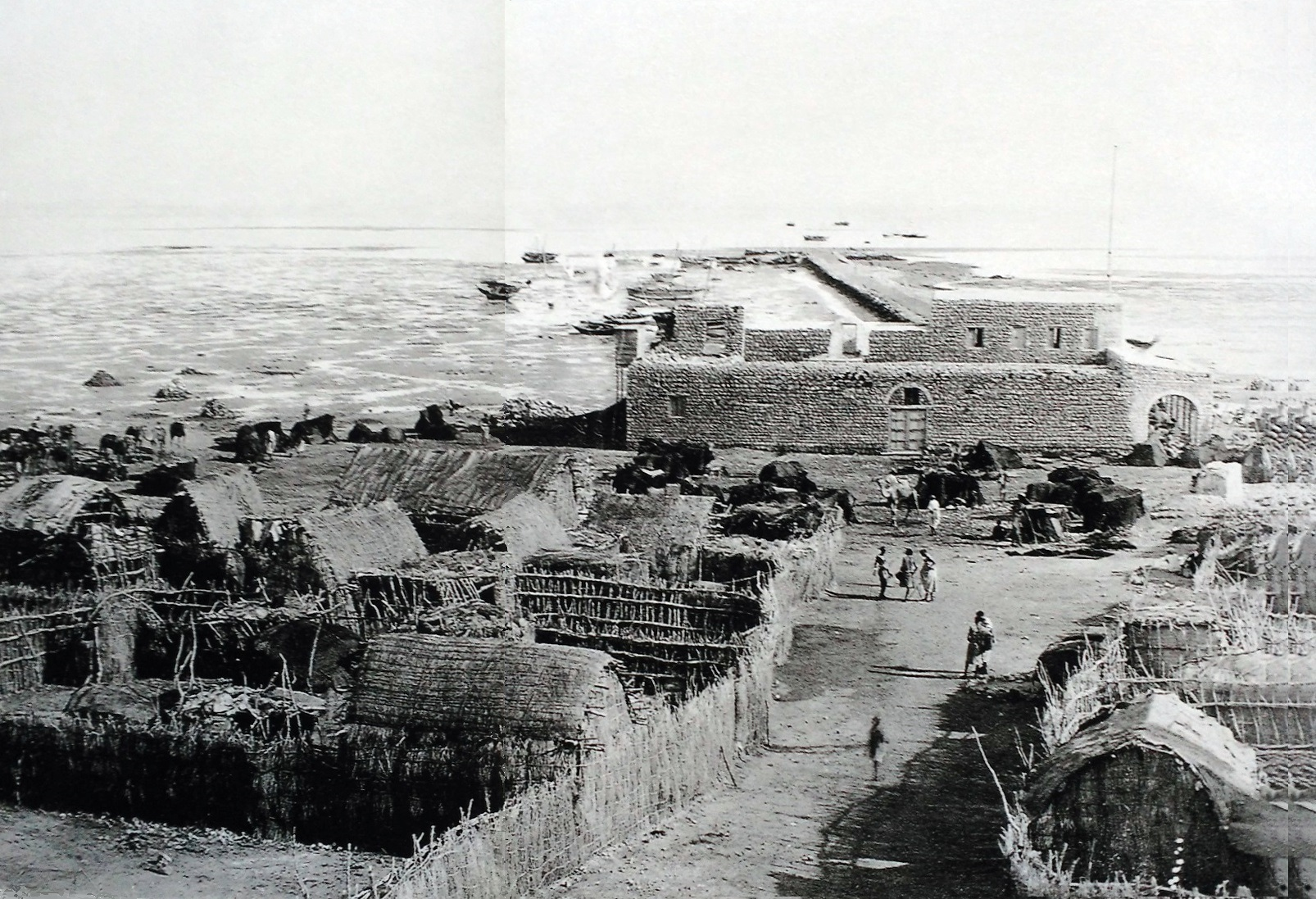
Zeila waterfront in the early 1880s

In 1874–75, the Egyptians obtained a firman from the Ottomans by which they secured claims over the city. At the same time, the Egyptians received British recognition of their nominal jurisdiction as far east as Cape Guardafui. In actuality, however, Egypt had little authority over the interior. Their period of rule on the coast was brief, lasting only a few years (1870–84). When the Egyptian garrison in Harar was evacuated in 1885, Zeila became caught up in the competition between the Tadjoura-based French and the British for control of the strategic Gulf of Aden littoral.

The policy of the rulers of Zeila in the past had been to subsidise the Issa. It was therefore usual for a newly appointed Ughaz to pay his respects first of all to the Governor of Zeila, who on his side was always anxious to propitiate the King of the Black Issa, in the hope that he would restrain his clansmen from molesting all caravans on the Zeila-Harar road. In 1876, the Ughaz was received and welcomed in Zeila in a very splendid way; the Pasha residents there celebrated him and went to receive him in Tocoscia. He was distinguished from the other leaders, because he was equipped with a garment, an umbrella and for the large amount of amulets, pockets and pouches. It was precisely by him that the tribute of fifty thalers and a piece of special cotton was imposed on the first Italian expedition, which Abubakr Pasha paid instantly.

In 1879, the town had about 4,000 to 5,000 inhabitants, including Afars, Issa/Gadabursi Somalis, Yemenis, Hadharem, Indians, and slaves (mainly Gallas and Abyssinians). Their diet was simple but varied, including grains like dhurra, wheat, and rice, as well as dates, sugar, biscuits, butter, livestock, milk, and fish, often imported from places like Aden, Mocha, and Hodeidah. People commonly wore turbans, vests, robes, and trousers. The town had many stone buildings and appears livelier and busier than other towns in the region.

=== British and French Interest ===
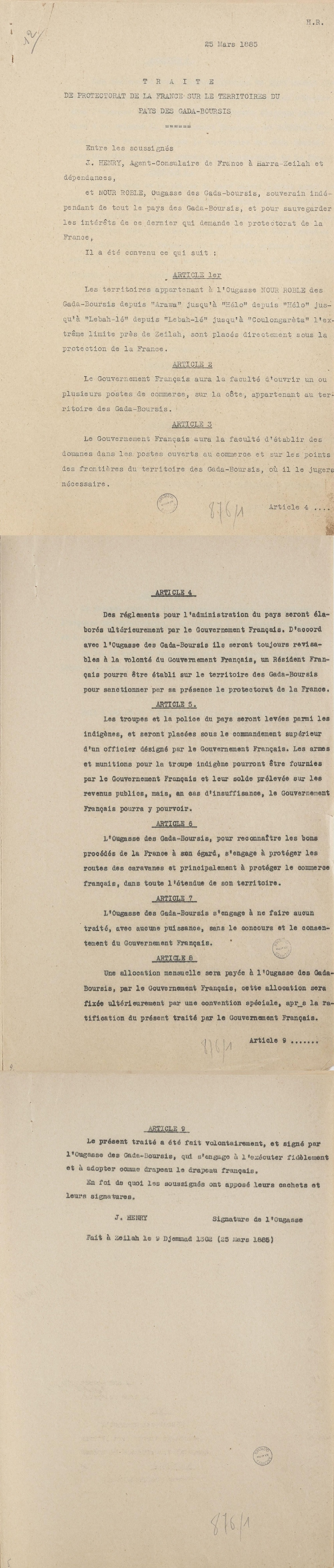
Protectorate Treaty between France and the Gadabuursi, signed at Zeila, 25 March 1885.

On 25 March 1885, the French government claimed that they signed a treaty with Ughaz Nur II of the Gadabuursi placing much of the coast and interior of the Gadabuursi country under the protectorate of France. The treaty titled in French, Traitè de Protectorat sur les Territoires du pays des Gada-Boursis, was signed by both J. Henry, the Consular Agent of France and Dependencies at Harar-Zeila, and Nur Robleh, Ughaz of the Gadabuursi, at Zeila on 9 Djemmad 1302 (March 25, 1885). The treaty states as follows (translated from French):

"Between the undersigned J. Henry, Consular Agent of France and Dependencies at Harrar-Zeilah, and Nour Roblé, Ougasse of the Gada-boursis, independent sovereign of the whole country of the Gada-boursis, and to safeguard the interests of the latter who is asking for the protectorate of France,

It was agreed as follows:

Art. 1st – The territories belonging to Ougasse Nour-Roblé of the Gada-boursis from "Arawa" to "Hélo" from "Hélô" to Lebah-lé", from "Lebah-lé" to "Coulongarèta" extreme limit by Zeilah, are placed directly under the protection of France.

Art. 2 – The French government will have the option of opening one or more commercial ports on the coast belonging to the territory of the Gada-boursis.

Art. 3 The French government will have the option of establishing customs in the posts open to trade, and on the points of the borders of the territory of the Gada-boursis where it deems it necessary. Customs tariffs will be set by the French government, and the revenues will be applied to public services.

Art. 4 – Regulations for the administration of the country will be elaborated later by the French government. In agreement with the Ougasse of the Gada-boursis they will always be revisable at the will of the French government, a French resident may be established on the territory of the Gada-boursis to sanction by his presence the protectorate of France.

Art. 5 – The troops and the police of the country will be raised among the natives, and will be placed under the superior command of an officer designated by the French government. Arms and ammunition for the native troops may be provided by the French government and their balance taken from the public revenues, but, in case of insufficiency, the French government may provide for them.

Art. 6 – The Ougasse of the Gada-boursis, to recognize the good practices of France towards it, undertakes to protect the caravan routes and mainly to protect French trade, throughout the extent of its territory.

Art. 7 – The Ougasse of the Gada-boursis undertakes not to make any treaty with any other power, without the assistance and consent of the French government.

Art. 8 – A monthly allowance will be paid to the Ougasse of the Gada-boursis by the French government, this allowance will be fixed later, by a special convention, after the ratification of this treaty by the French government.

Art. 9 – This treaty was made voluntarily and signed by the Ougasse of the Gada-boursis, which undertakes to execute it faithfully and to adopt the French flag as its flag.

In witness whereof the undersigned have affixed their stamps and signatures.

J.Henry

Signature of Ougasse

Done at Zeilah on 9 Djemmad 1302 (March 25, 1885)."

— Traité de protectorat de la France sur les territoires du pays des Gada-boursis, 9 Djemmad 1302 (March 25, 1885), Zeilah.

The French claimed that the treaty with the Ughaz of the Gadabuursi gave them jurisdiction over the entirety of the Zeila coast and the Gadabuursi country.

However, the British attempted to deny this agreement between the French and the Gadabuursi citing that that Ughaz had a representative at Zeila when the Gadabuursi signed their treaty with the British in December 1884. The British suspected that this treaty was designed by the Consular Agent of France and Dependencies at Harrar-Zeila to circumvent British jurisdiction over the Gadabuursi country and allow France to lay claim to sections of the Somali coast. There was also suspicion that Ughaz Nur II had attempted to cause a diplomatic row between the British and French governments in order to consolidate his own power in the region.

According to I. M. Lewis, this treaty clearly influenced the demarcation of the boundaries between the two protectorates, establishing the coastal town of Djibouti as the future official capital of the French colony:

"By the end of 1885 Britain was preparing to resist an expected French landing at Zeila. Instead, however, of a decision by force, both sides now agreed to negotiate. The result was an Anglo-French agreement of 1888 which defined the boundaries of the two protectorates as between Zeila and Jibuti: four years later the latter port became the official capital of the French colony."

=== British Somaliland ===
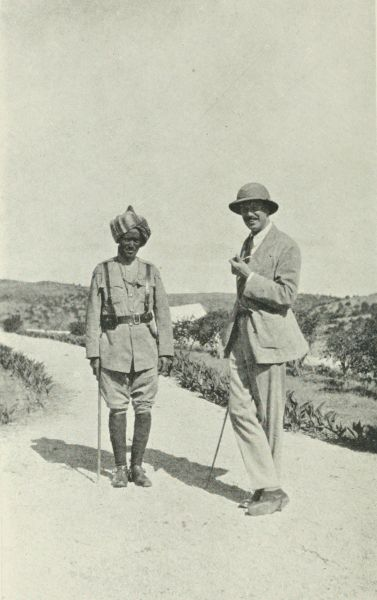
Buralleh (Buralli) Robleh, Sub-Inspector of Police of Zeila, and General Gordon, Governor of British Somaliland, in Zeila (1921).

On 9 February 1888, France and Britain concluded an agreement defining the boundary between their respective protectorates. As a result, Zeila and its eastern neighbor Berbera came to be part of British Somaliland.

The construction of a railway from Djibouti to Addis Ababa in the late 19th century continued the neglect of Zeila. At the beginning of the next century, the city was described in the 1911 Encyclopædia Britannica as having a "good sheltered anchorage much frequented by Arab sailing craft. However, heavy draught steamers are obliged to anchor a mile and a half from the shore. Small coasting boats lie off the pier and there is no difficulty in loading or discharging cargo. The water supply of the town is drawn from the wells of Takosha, about three miles distant; every morning camels, in charge of old Somali women and bearing goatskins filled with water, come into the town in picturesque procession. ... [Zeila's] imports, which reach Zeila chiefly via Aden, are mainly cotton goods, rice, jowaree, dates and silk; the exports, 90% of which are from Abyssinia, are principally coffee, skins, ivory, cattle, ghee and mother-of-pearl". Philipp Paulitschke stated that both the Gadabuursi and Habar Awal clans were present in Zeila, as permanent or occasional agents acting on behalf of their nomadic kin.

Buralle Robleh the subinspector of police of Zeila was described by Major Rayne as one of the most important men in Zeila along with 2 others. He is featured on the image to the right with General Gordon, Governor of British Somaliland. The two Somali clans coming under the Zeila agency were the Issa and Gadabursi who were represented by thirty-six and thirty-seven akils respectively.

In August 1940, Zeila was captured by advancing Italian troops. It would remain under their occupation for over six months.

=== Early Folk Music ===
The Austrian explorer and geographer, P. V. Paulitschke, mentioned that in 1886, the British General and Assistant Political Resident at Zeila, J. S. King, recorded a famous Somali folk song native to Zeila and titled: "To my Beloved", which was written by a Gadabuursi man to a girl of the same tribe. The song became hugely popular throughout Zeila despite it being incomprehensible to the other Somalis.

Philipp Paulitschke (1886) mentions about the song:

"To my Beloved: Ancient song of the Zeilans (Ahl Zeila), a mixture of Arabs, Somâli, Abyssinians and Negroes, which Major J. S. King dictated to a hundred-year-old man in 1886. The song was incomprehensible to the Somâl. It is undoubtedly written by a Gadaburssi and addressed to a girl of the same tribe."

Lyrics of the song in Somali translated to English:

Inád dor santahâj wahân kagarân difta ku gutalah.
Jidkagi dalajsna sidî dagal madobája.
Bukur dora dûk lamâ hadto ê darafmadan ghaili.
Dukad jo tawâschi âd g'amahā dibugu la fijûtu?
Darhaga harábka o dakhal sides mughda.
Darafjid harako ádigo dalaka lainâjā
Dugagadaha wahan kagadigî dûbi l'agêda.
Dunjada turkugû nûdugûja dâr-taijadda búhada.
Jilal dirbigga Sâhil bâdūbī sarênkīja.
Dara'dînă wahio kugudi doha Hirwwâ.
Duhbán kagalên nimika dagâ dabâ nugâlīda.
Meschád kádaiji kamâ aid'in dûgsin l'abája.
Jntán maraddu d'a'is kagadimân dûbō gūguschâda

— To My Beloved
Translation:

Noticing your offbeat rhythm, likely from your heavy steps.
Your once radiant cheek now dark as coal.
A fancy veil is there, but it can't replace your worn one.
Can you spot a sleek black horse, fragrances, and attendants around?
When you reach out your hand, it's like you're proudly balancing to step out.
Your posture and height remind me of a Bustard, and you swagger with pride.
I'll share some silver from the wealth the Turk left us and our full house.
During winter in Bér-bera, you can use the wheat to bake a cake.
Summer will bring rain in the Hirwwâ (Harrawa) valley just for you.
You won't be bothered by the oily dirt from people beyond the desert.
If it rains, it's not the kind you'd want to drink.
Keep your clothes neat by setting up your camp right.

=== Present ===
On 9 February 1991, the Somali National Movement (SNM) clashed with Djiboutian-backed USF forces on the Djiboutian border, with the Issa USF forces, backed by former Somalian regulars, occupying the western parts of Awdal region with the goal of annexing Zeyla to Djibouti. The SNM rejected their claims, and took military action against the USF soldiers, which were swiftly routed and violently crushed.

In the post-independence period, Zeila was administered as part of the official Awdal region of Somaliland.

Following the outbreak of the civil war in the early 1990s, much of the city's historic infrastructure was destroyed and many residents left the area. However, remittance funds sent by relatives abroad have contributed toward the reconstruction of the town, as well as the local trade and fishing industries.

== Demographics ==
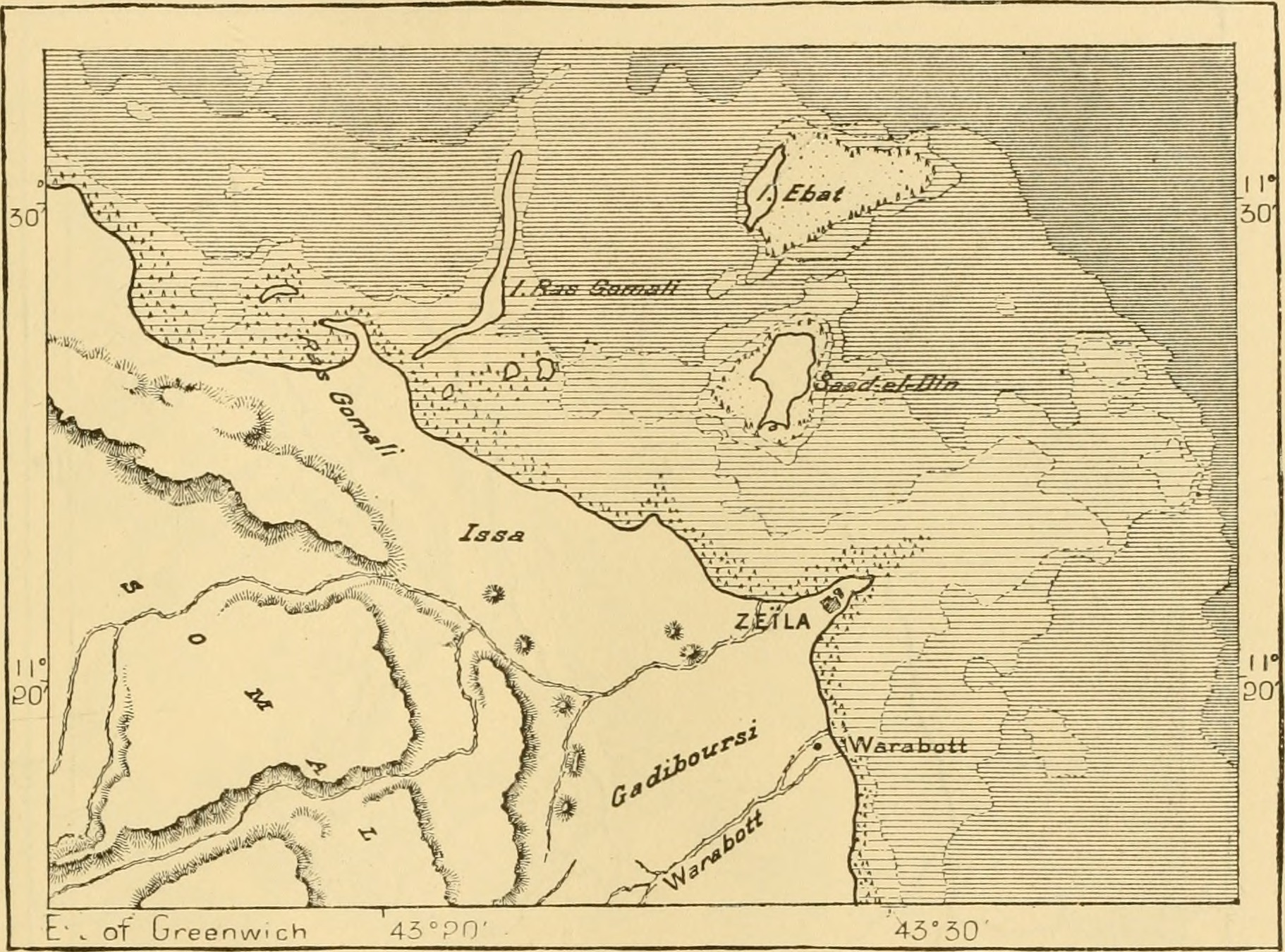
An old map of Zeila featuring the Gadabuursi and Issa subclans of the Dir clan family.

The town of Zeila is primarily inhabited by people from the Somali ethnic group, with the Gadabuursi subclan of the Dir especially well represented. The Issa subclan of the Dir are especially well represented in the wider Zeila District.

Tim Glawion (2020) describes the clan demographics of both the town of Zeila and the wider Zeila District:

"Three distinct circles can be distinguished based on the way the security arena is composed in and around Zeila: first, Zeila town, the administrative centre, which is home to many government institutions and where the mostly ethnic Gadabuursi/Samaron inhabitants engage in trading or government service activities; second, Tokhoshi, an artisanal salt mining area eight kilometres west of Zeila, where a mixture of clan and state institutions provide security, and two large ethnic groups (Ciise and Gadabuursi/Samaron) live alongside one another; third the southern rural areas, which are almost universally inhabited by the Ciise clan, with its long, rigid culture of self-rule."

Elisée Reclus (1886) describes the two main ancient routes leading from Harar to Zeila, one route passing through the country of the Gadabuursi and one route passing through Issa territory. The author describes the town of Zeila and its immediate environs as being inhabited by the Gadabuursi, whereas the wider Zeila District and countryside south of the town, as being traditional Issa clan territory:

"Two routes, often blocked by the inroads of plundering hordes, lead from Harrar to Zeila. One crosses a ridge to the north of the town, thence redescending into the basin of the Awash by the Galdessa Pass and valley, and from this point running towards the sea through Issa territory, which is crossed by a chain of trachytic rocks trending southwards. The other and more direct but more rugged route ascends north-eastwards towards the Darmi Pass, crossing the country of the Gadibursis or Gudabursis. The town of Zeila lies south of a small archipelago of islets and reefs on the point of the coast where it is hemmed in by the Gadibursi tribe. It has two ports, one frequented by boats but impracticable for ships, whilst the other, not far south of the town, although very narrow, is from 26 to 33 feet deep, and affords safe shelter to large craft."

== Sources ==
- McClanahan, T. R.; Sheppard, C. R. C.; Obura, D. O. (2000). Coral Reefs of the Indian Ocean: Their Ecology and Conservation. Oxford University Press. ISBN 0-195-35217-3.
