= Zeila Archipelago =

Archipelago in the Gulf of Aden

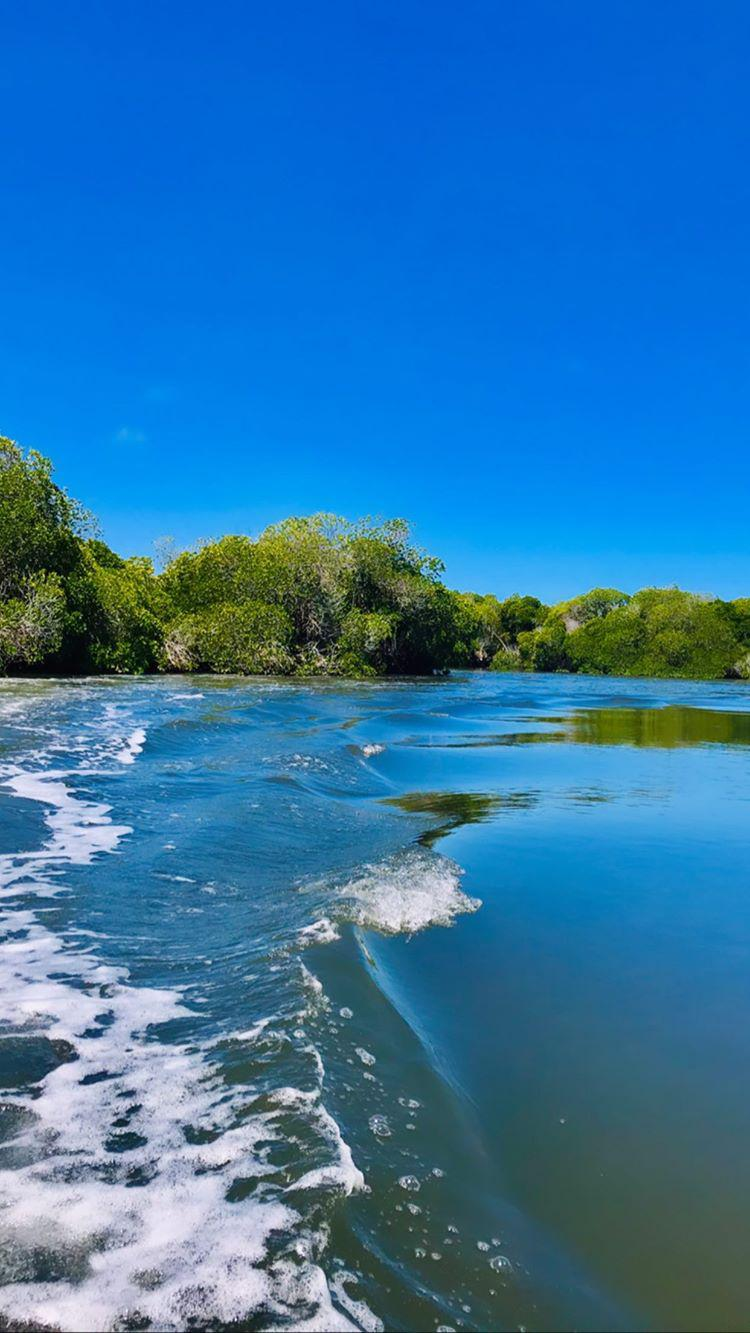

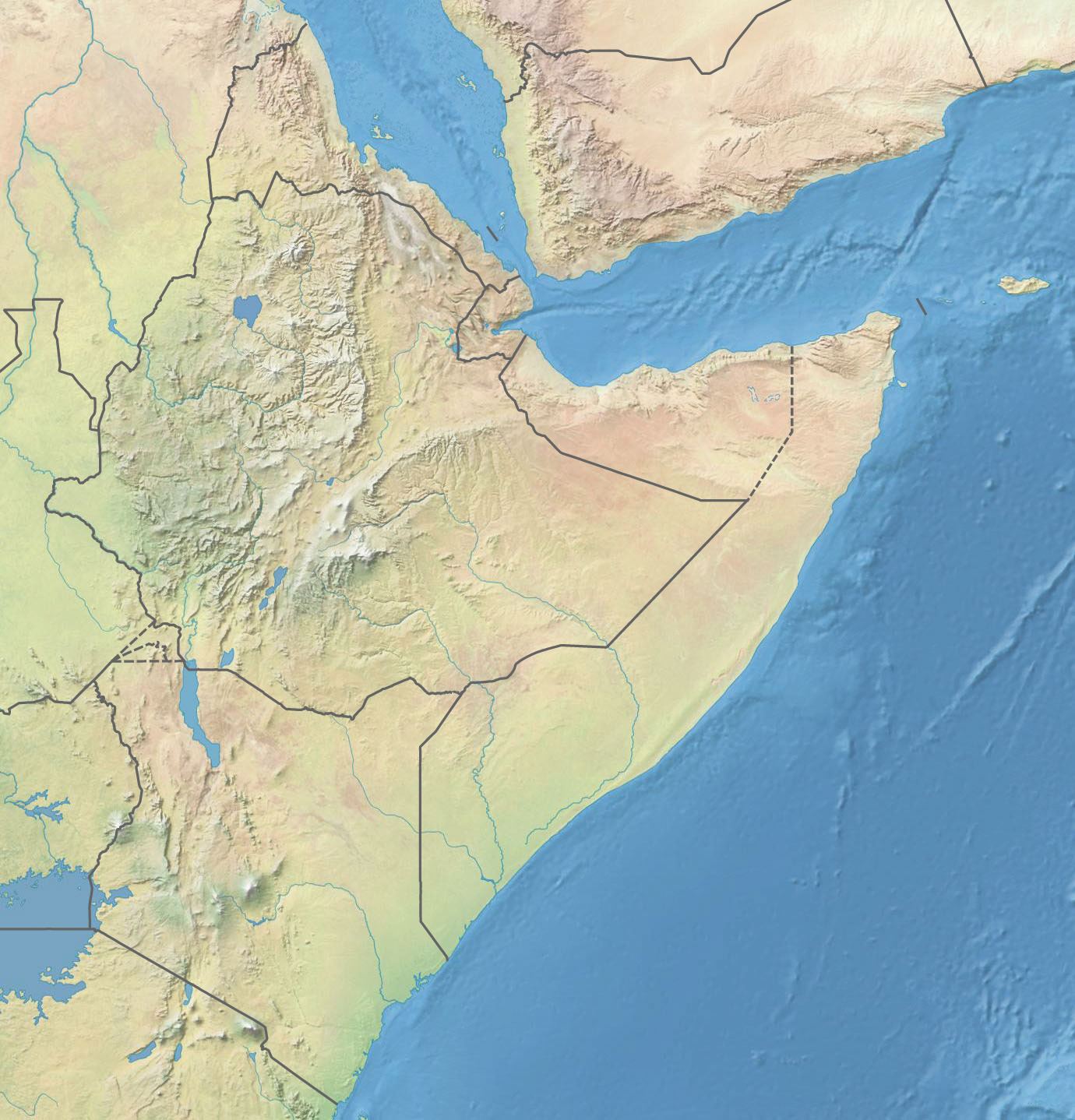
- Location within Awdal Location within Somaliland Location within Horn of Africa

Geography
- Location: Somaliland
- Coordinates: From 11°29.5′N 43°17′E to 11°21′N 43°28′E
- Archipelago: Zeila Archipelago
- Total islands: 6
- Major islands: Sa'ad Din, Aibat, Ras Gomali.

Administration
- Somaliland

Demographics
- Ethnic groups: Somali

The Sa'ad ad-Din Islands (Somali: Jasiiradda Sacadaddiin, Arabic: جزر سعد الدين), also Romanized as Sa'ad-ed-din and known as the Zeila Archipelago, are a group of islands off the northwestern coast of Somaliland. They are situated near the ancient city of Zeila.

The Zeila Archipelago is made of six small islands all of which are low-lying and have sandy beaches. The largest of these islands are Sacadin and Aibat, which are six and nine miles off the coast of Zeila, respectively. There is also a lighthouse at Aibat.

== Etymology & History ==
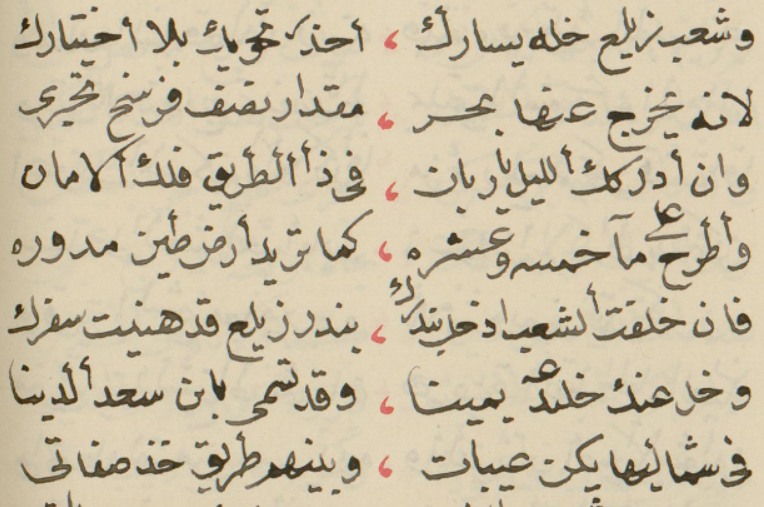
Ibn Majid's notes on Zeila and the Sa'ad ad-Din islands

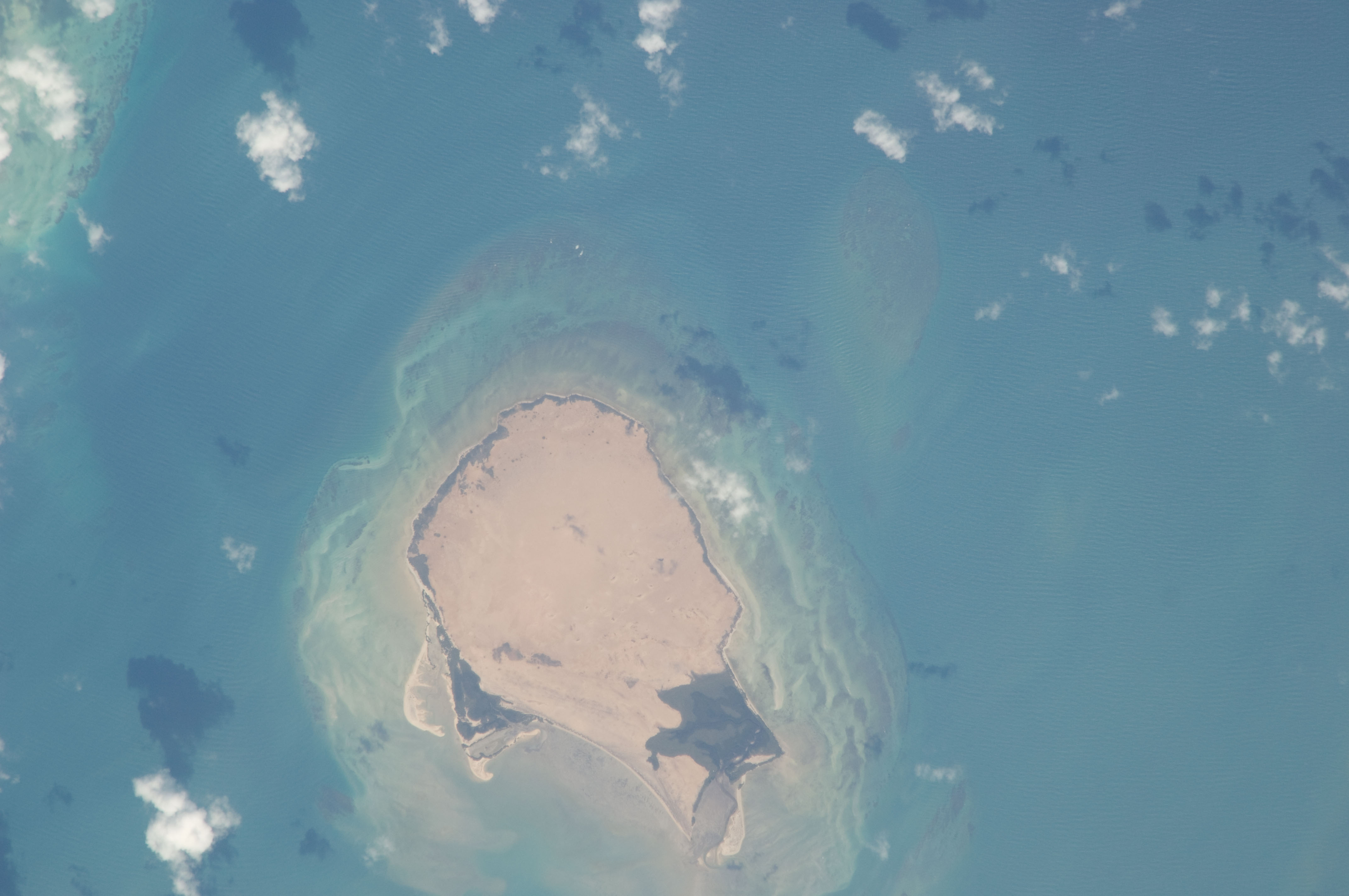
Satellite view of Sacadin Island, the largest island in the Zeila Archipelago, as seen from the International Space Station.

The name for the archipelago comes from the Sultan Sa'ad ad-Din II who was killed by the Emperor of Abyssinia on the main island in 1403. Along with his name, there are many different spellings for the island such as Sa'ad ed Din, Sa'ad-ed-din, and Sa'ad-ad-Din. The archpeligo is also known as the Zeila Archipelago and the Sa'ad ad-Din group.

Legendary Arab explorer Ahmad ibn Mājid wrote of the archipelago and a few other notable landmarks and ports of the northern Somali coast, including Zeila, Berbera, Xiis, Alula, Ruguuda, Maydh, Ceel-Sheekh, Siyara and El-Darad.

The archipelago is the site where the remaining forces of Sheikh Bashir were shipped to after the conclusion of the 1945 Sheikh Bashir Rebellion.

== Environment ==
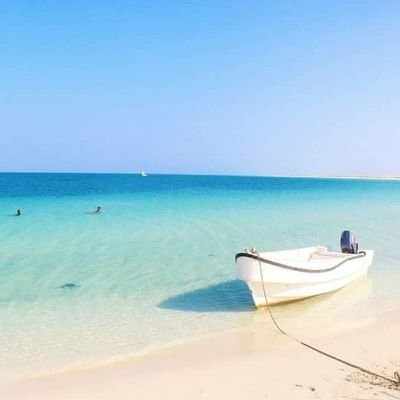
Aibat island, Zeila Archipelago.

The Sa'ad ad-Din Islands are well known for their splendid coral reefs similar to those found on the southern coast of Oman. These reefs are the most diverse and well formed coral reefs on the coast of the Gulf of Aden and possibly the largest in the region. From provincial counts, ninety-nine different species of coral from forty-three different genera have been found on the islands.

There are also a hundred and thirty-two different species of coral fish found around the archipelago. Many of these species include those also found in the Red Sea, Gulf of Aden, and the Indian Ocean.

The island of Sa'ad ad-Din and Aibat (called Ceebaad in Somali) both are sites of major bird colonies. On the island of Sa'ad ad-Din alone, there were more than 100,000 breeding pairs recorded.

Following the 2004 Indian Ocean earthquake and tsunami, the International Union for Conservation of Nature (IUCN) and other NGO worked with local authorities to establish protected areas and monitor fishers on the islands.

== Demographics ==
The archipelago currently has no permanent residents and is uninhabited, though it is still occasionally visited by tourists, local fishermen, and those who wish to honor Sa'ad ad-Din II.

== See also ==
- Ifat Sultanate
- Sa'ad ad-Din II
- Zeila
- List of islands in the Indian Ocean
- Bajuni Islands

== Sources ==
- Abdullahi, Mohamed Diriye (2001). Culture and Customs of Somalia. Greenwood Publishing Group. ISBN 0-313-31333-4.
- After the Tsunami: Rapid Environmental Assessment. United Nations Environment Programme. 2005. ISBN 92-807-2565-3.
- Annual Colonial Office Report on the Somaliland Protectorate, 1948. London: HMSO. p. 31.
- Briggs, Philip (2012b). Somaliland. Bradt Travel Guides. ISBN 978-1-84162-371-9.
- Briggs, Philip (2012a). Somaliland: With Addis Ababa & Eastern Ethiopia. Bradt Travel Guides. ISBN 978-1-84162-371-9.
- "Country Environmental Profile for Somalia" (PDF). p. 8. Archived from the original (PDF) on 2014-04-17.
- "Development and management of a network of marine protected areas in the Red Sea and Gulf of Aden region" (PDF). PERSGA: The Regional Organization for the Conservation of the Environment of the Red Sea & Gulf of Aden. p. 745. Archived from the original (PDF) on 2014-04-17.
- Gurney, Jason (1966). Sheba's coast. Hale.
- Hunter, Frederick Mercer (1877). An Account of the British Settlement of Aden in Arabia. Trübner. ISBN 978-153580064-8.
- "Ibn Majid, Ahmad". Medieval Science, Technology, and Medicine: An Encyclopedia. Routledge. 2005. p. 252. ISBN 978-1-135-45932-1.
- McClanahan, T. R.; Sheppard, C. R. C.; Obura, D. O. (2000). Coral Reefs of the Indian Ocean: Their Ecology and Conservation: Their Ecology and Conservation. Oxford University Press. ISBN 0-19-535217-3.
- Moldenke, H.N.; Moldenke, A.L. (1980). A Sixth Summary of the Verbenaceae, Avicenniaceae, Stilbaceae, Chloanthaceae, Symphoremaceae, Nyctanthaceae, and Eriocaulaceae of the World as to Valid Taxa, Geographic Distribution and Synonymy. H.N. Moldenke and A.L. Moldenke.
- National Geospatial-Intelligence Agency (2007). Sailing Directions – Enroute. ProStar Publications. ISBN 978-1-57785-760-0.
- Nigel Redman, Terry Stevenson (2009). Birds of the Horn of Africa: Ethiopia, Eritrea, Djibouti, Somalia and Socotra. A&C Black. ISBN 978-0-7136-6541-3.
- Reclus, Élisée (1886). The Earth and Its Inhabitants, Africa: North-east Africa. D. Appleton.
- "ReefBase: : Global Database: Resources - Overview - Eastern Africa - Somaliland". 2000. Archived from the original on 2019-02-18.
- "Regional Status of Breeding Seabirds in the Red Sea and the Gulf of Aden" (PDF). PERSGA: The Regional Organization for the Conservation of the Environment of the Red Sea & Gulf of Aden. Archived from the original (PDF) on 2019-02-15.
- Schleyer, M. H.; Baldwin, Robert M. (1999). Biodiversity Assessment of the Northern Somali Coast East of Berbera. IUCN Eastern Africa Regional Office.
- "Survey design for Proposed Marine Protected Areas" (PDF). PERSGA: The Regional Organization for the Conservation of the Environment of the Red Sea & Gulf of Aden. pp. 20, 29. Archived from the original (PDF) on 2016-09-11.
