= Chula (island) =

Island of Somalia

Coordinates: 1.007°S 42.040°E

Chula is an island that is a part of the Bajuni Islands archipelago in southern Somalia in the Somali Sea. It is the most populated of the six islands.

== See also ==
- Jasiirada Khuuri
