= Garhajis =

Subclan of the Isaaq Somali clan family

Habr Garhajis هبر غرحاجسة
- Isaaq Somali Clan
- Ethnicity: (Somaliland) Somali
- Location: (Djibouti) Djibouti; Somaliland (United States) US (United Kingdom) UK; Ethiopia Saudi Arabia (Somalia) Somalia (United Arab Emirates) UAE (Kenya) Kenya; Yemen
- Descended from: Ismā'īl ibn Sheikh Isḥāq ibn Aḥmad
- Parent tribe: Isaaq
- Branches: Daud (Eidgale): Mohmmad Daud; Musa Daud; Abu Bakr Daud; Said (Habar Yunis): Ali Said; Arreh Said
- Language: (Somaliland) Somali (Arab League) Arabic
- Religion: Sunni Islam

The Habr Garhajis also contemporarily known as the Garhajis (Somali: Habar Garxajis, Arabic: غرحاجس, Full Nasab: Ismā'īl al Qadhi ibn ash-Shaykh Isḥāq ibn Aḥmad) is a major Northern Somali clan of the wider Isaaq clan family. They are the traditional holders of the Isaaq Sultanate and Habr Yunis Sultanate since the 18th century. As descendants of Ismail bin Sheikh Isaaq, its members form a part of the Habar Magaadle confederation, and they constitute one of the largest sub-clans of the Isaaq. The Garhajis are divided into two major sub-clans: the Habr Yunis (Sa'īd Ismail) and Eidagale (Da'ud Isma'īl). They are traditionally nomadic pastoralists, merchants and skilled poets.

== Distribution ==
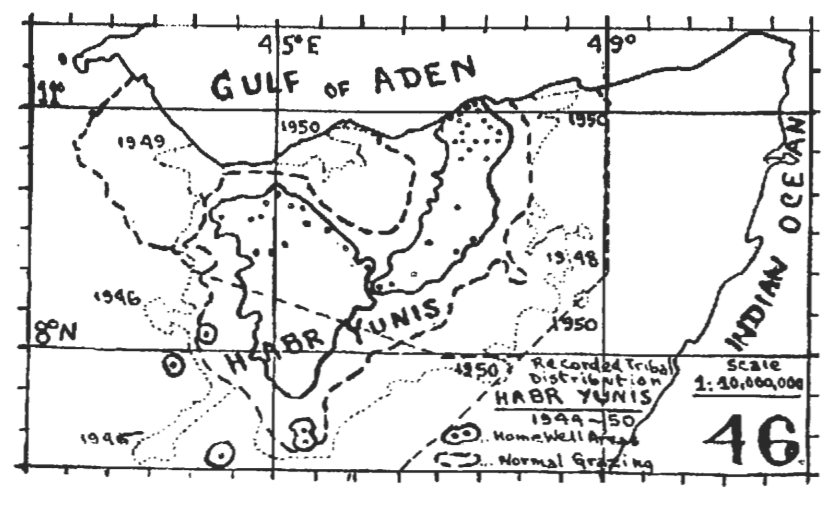
Map of Somaliland showing the distribution of the Habar Yoonis

The Garhajis inhabit the western Togdheer, southern and eastern Maroodi Jeex, southern Sahil, northern Sool and central Sanaag regions of Somaliland. As well as inhabiting the Degehbur, Wardheer and Aware zones in the Haud region of Ethiopia, they also have a large settlement in Kenya where they are known as a constituent segment of the Isahakia community. A subclan of the Habr Yunis, the Damal Muse, also inhabit the Mudug region of Somalia.

== History ==
=== Medieval period ===
Historically, the Garhajis took part in the conquest of Abyssinia and were part of the Adal Sultanate and are mentioned in the book Futuh al-Habasha (Conquest of Abyssinia) as the Habar Magaadle. The Habar Magaadle consist of the Habar Yunis, Eidagale, Habar Awal, Arap and Ayub clans. The Habar Magaadle are known for producing a historical figure known as Ahmad Gurey bin Husain who was the right-hand man of Ahmad ibn Ibrahim al-Ghazi.

I. M. Lewis discusses the existence of another leader named Ahmad Gurey, and suggests that the two leaders have been conflated into one historical figure:

The text refers to two Ahmad's with the nickname 'Left-handed'. One is regularly presented as 'Ahmad Guray, the Somali' (...) identified as Ahmad Gurey Xuseyn, chief of the Habar Magadle. Another reference, however, appears to link the Habar Magadle with the Eidagal. The other Ahmad is simply referred to as 'Imam Ahmad' or simply the 'Imam'.This Ahmad is not qualified by the adjective Somali (...) The two Ahmad's have been conflated into one figure, the heroic Ahmed Guray

Some descendants of the Habr Yunis knights who participated in the conquest still inhabit regions west of Harar near Hirna. Ulrich Braukämper in A History of the Hadiyya in Southern Ethiopia states :

Amongst the troops recruited from the eastern pans of the Horn of Africa for the Jihad, warriors of Somali descent occasionally stayed in the conquered territories of the west and settled in the principalities of Hadiyya, Sarha and Bale. In present-day Arsi land there are still sporadic recollections of these Ogaadeen peoples. Occasionally they are still identifiable by their ethnic origin, like the Habr Yuunis and Garjeeda. Preserving bonds of interethnic clan relations with the Somali inhabited region...the Habr Yuunis from the vicinity of Hirna in Carcar joined the exodus to the west at the time of Amir Nur and occupied an area suitable for livestock-breeding east of Lake Zay.

=== Habr Yunis Sultanate ===
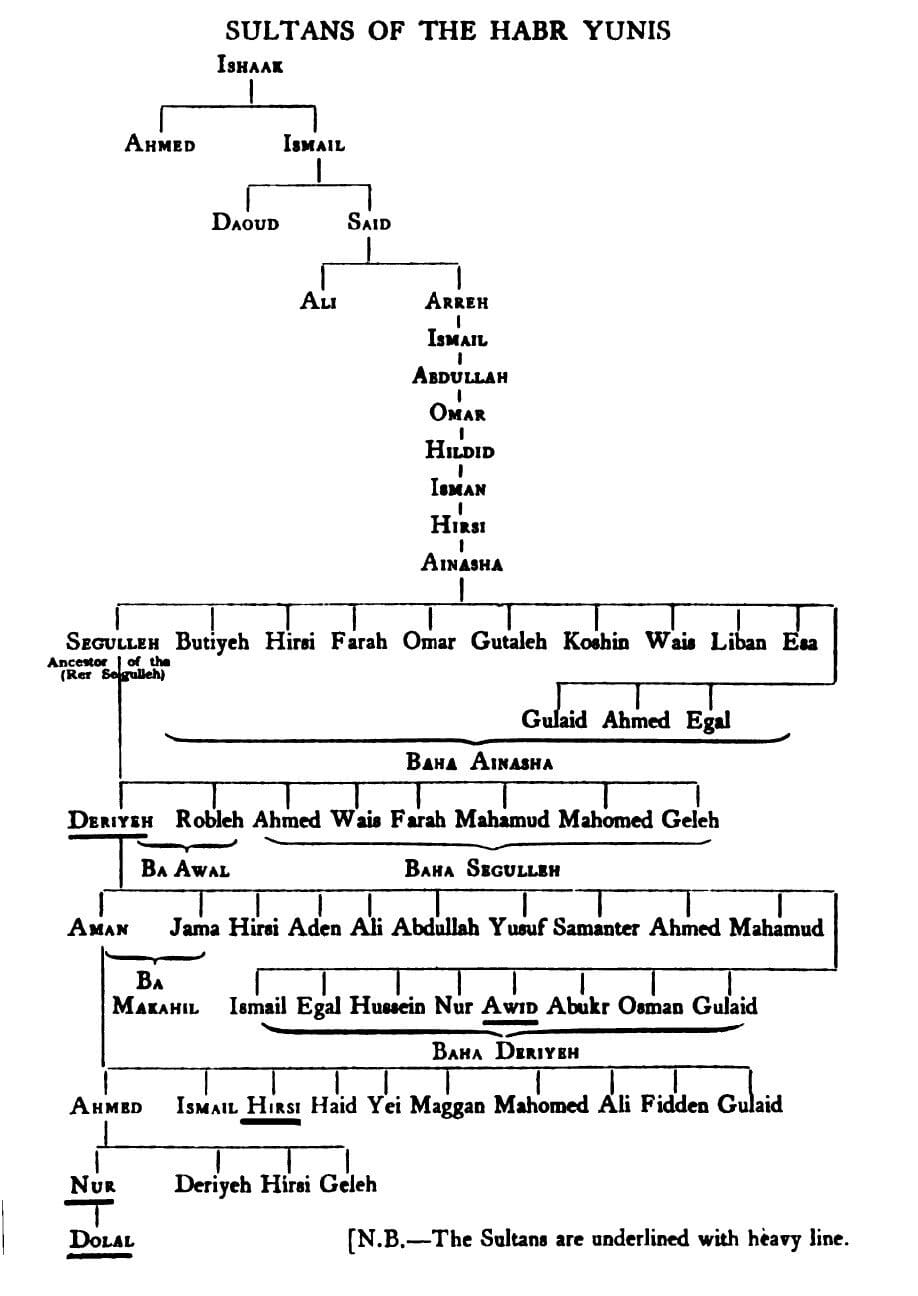
Genealogy of the Habr Yunis Sultans by Drake Brockman, 1912.

The sultanate was founded by the Rer Ainanshe sub branch of the Habr Yunis. The clan takes its name from their 18th century Patriarch Ainanshe Hersi who was a Chieftain of the Habar Yoonis clan. As was the norm of Somali chieftains, Ainanshe had multiple wives. His first wife belonged to the Jibrahil clan and was the mother of his eldest son Sugulle who would go on to found the Ba Jibrhil Rer Sugulle which is the section of the clan that all the Habr Yunis Sultan's descend. Ainanshe's other wives Mun, Basla and Egalo bore him 16 sons who are collectively known as the Baha Ainanshe. The etymology of the name Ainanshe originates from the word Ainan which in Somali means the horse's reins, when suffixed with she it takes on the meaning of one who is holding the reins, leading and guiding from disaster. Ainanshe's tomb is located to the south of Burao in the town of Jameecada Caynaanshe near the Oodweyne district border.

Enrico Baudi i Vesme who visited Burao in 1889 met the sons of Burao Chieftains Guled Ahmed Sugulle and Awad Gal, they relayed to him the following:

..They told me the story of their tribe. The chieftain of the Habr Yunis lineage, named Ainanshe, had 17 sons, one of whose name was Sugulle. First they stayed together, then they separated, forming one Rer Sugulle, who are the most numerous, the other 16 sons together, the Baha Ainanshe. When, a few years ago, there was war between Awad and Nur, the latter ended up settling in Toyo with part of the Habr Yunis.

volume 7 of Etiopia rassegna illustrata dell'Impero describing the Rer Ainanshe states writes :

Rer Ainanshe (Baha) and Rer Sugulle belonging to the Ismail Arreh are the center of the Habr Yunis group and also their backbone. Their prestige is probably the highest among the Somalis, and both in number, compactness, fighting ability and raids may perhaps be considered to occupy the first place together being equal to each other. The Rer Sugulle, in fact, belongs to the main branch of the Ainanshe but can be considered a separate group. The two are not at all interwined but in case of a Habr Yunis movement the tribe may gather around these two sub-tribes.

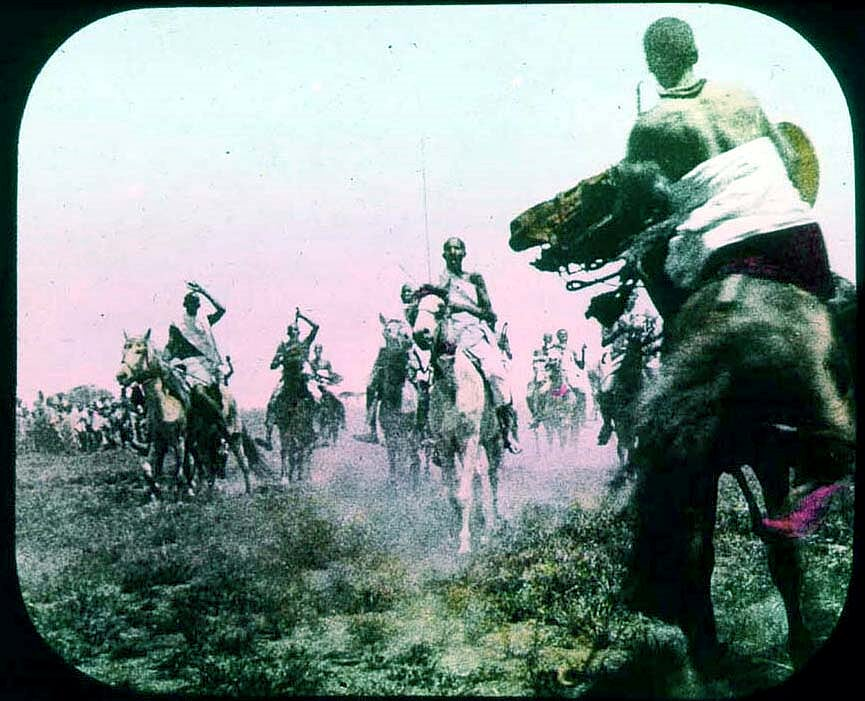
Sultan Nur & Habar Yunis horsemen 1896

The Habr Yunis Sultanate finds its roots in the Isaaq Sultanate which was established by the Rer Guled branch of the Eidagale after the Isaaq successfully defeated the Absame clan at Lafaruug in the 17th century. With time the Habr Yunis and later the Habr Awal and Habr Je'lo would break from the Isaaq Sultanate with the Habr Yunis forming their own Sultanate led by Sugulle the son of the previous Habr Yunis Chieftain, Ainanshe Hersi. The Sultan Deria Sugulleh would establish his capital at Wadhan (Waram) near the Sheikh pass and tax and administer the affairs of the Habr Yunis from the town. Large caravans bound for Berbera would pass through Habr Yunis territory through Burao and then Wadhan and proved a lucrative source of income for Sultan Deria. Deria was succeeded by Hersi the son of Aman Deria who had died before his Sultan father, he was an important Habr Yunis chieftain. Vesme Baudi travelling through Habr Je'lo country east of Burao in 1889 gives an account of Aman's tomb.

At nine o'clock we arrived at Baiadowal, on the Thug Dehr, a charming site, where the trees form a small forest, in which the most delightful coolness is enjoyed. A few hundred meters away there is a tomb surrounded by a palisade of tree trunks made with care. There rests a chieftain of the Habr Junis, by name Ohman-Dhirrin [Aman Deria]..his tribe had intermingled with the Habr Gialeh, and when that chief had died, they had made him that tomb with a palisade in memory of his great merits.

Hersi Aman is remembered for his successful conquests and expansion of Garhajis territory in the Haud. His reign was abruptly ended when he was killed in a battle against the kindred Baha Sugulleh. Ismail Mire in his famous poem Ragow Kibirka Waa Lagu Kufaa (Pride Comes Before a Fall) comments on Hersi's conquests, pride and desire to rule.

Kaysaha adduun Ina Ammaan koos dhan buu helaye
Ragba keeno geli buu is-yidhi waad u korraysaaye
Isba kii arsaa’ilay ma filin kamana yaabayne
Ragow kibirka waa lagu kufaa kaa ha la ogaado

— Ismail Mire Ragaw Kibirka Waa Lagu Kufaa
Translation:

With worldly pride Ina Ammaan gained a whole land
Let all men put the horse's bit in their mouths
He said to himself ‘You are on top’
But he didn't expect the one who killed him and was taken by surprise
Oh men. Pride comes before a fall. Let that be known

Dual Sultans Era

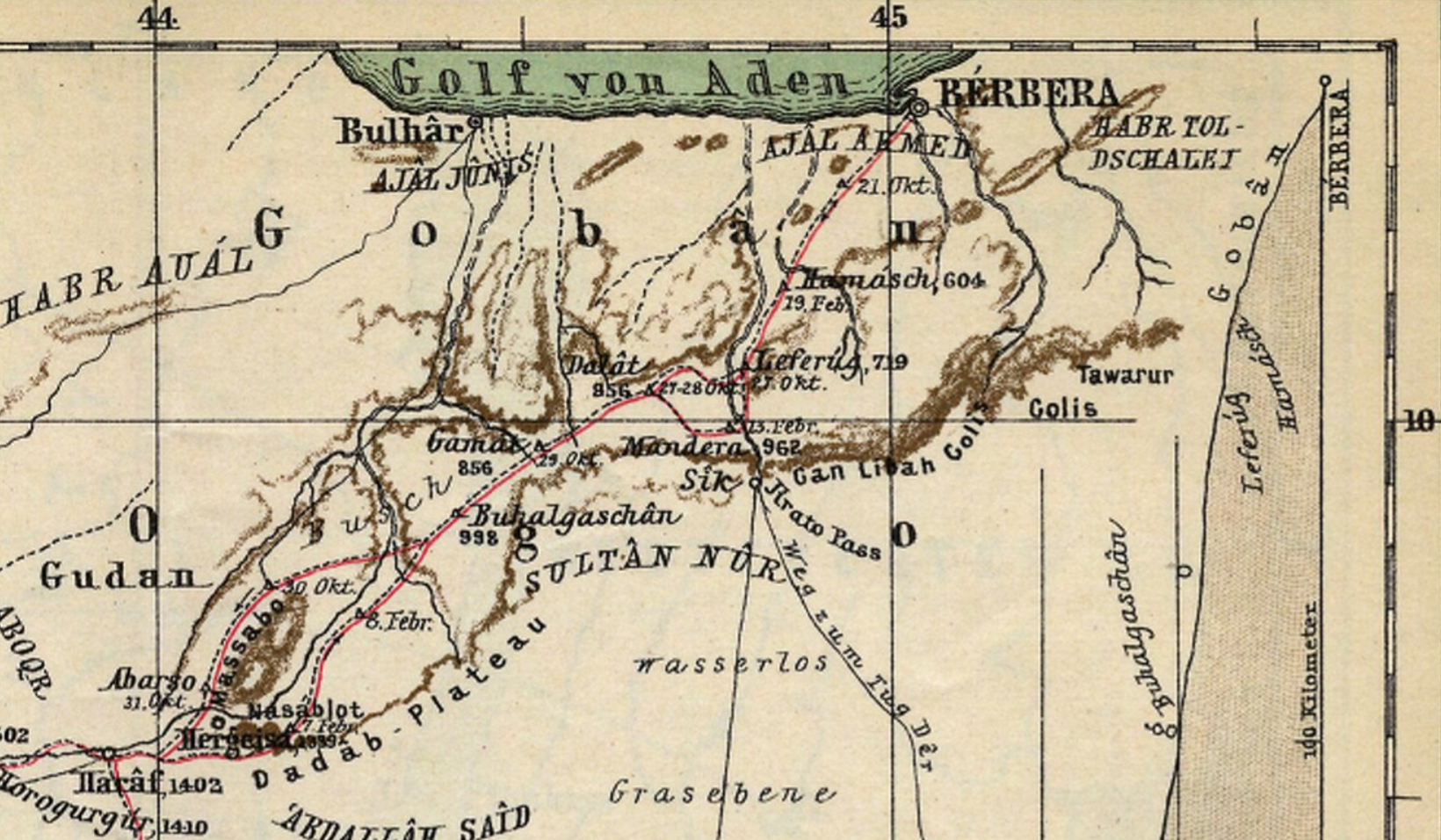
Sultan Nur's domains in Togdheer

After the death of Sultan Hersi Aman, the Baha Deria and Baha Makahil sections of the Sugulle dynasty vied for the Sultanship, which divided the Habr Yunis clan into two factions, the Baha Deria faction led by Guled Haji crowned Awad Deria a surviving son of the Sultan Deria Sugulleh. The Bah Makahil crowned Nur Ahmed Aman a young Mullah and nephew of Hersi Aman. Nur was initially uneasy and preferred his life as a Mullah rather than being the Sultan designate. The Habr Yunis were not interrupted by the British Somaliland protectorate which had been established in 1884 and was still largely relegated to the coast and its capital of Berbera. The two Sultans engaged in a lengthy war and divided the Sultanate's territory, where Awad ruled the Sultanate from his chosen capital of Burao and Nur from the Tuuyo plains and Oodweyne.

Frank Linsly James visited Sultan Awad at Burao in 1884 and witnessed the dissenting situation between the two Sultans. Describing the political situation in the region and frequent raids between the two rival Rer Sugulleh factions and their allied Habr Yunis subclans

It appeared the great Habr Gerhajis tribe was divided into two rival factions, the one owning allegiance to Sultan Owd, the other to his cousin, Sultan Noor. Between these two the country was about evenly divided, and the border-line was an everlasting scene of wars and rumours of wars, cattle raids, and attempted murders.

The Haber-Gerhajis tribe had formerly been under one Sultan and were very powerful, making frequent raids into Ogadayn, but on his death, two cousins, Awad and Nur, divided the country between them.

Linsley describing a Dibaltig for Sultan Awad at Togdheer river :

During our stay at Burao, the Sultan collected a great many of his people together, and twice entertained us with some well-executed and characteristic evolutions on horseback. On the first occasion some forty mounted men were collected in the Tug before our zariba; but this did not satisfy the Sultan, and he arranged a second "fantasia," in which fully two hundred warriors were engaged. It was the best and most characteristic thing of the kind I had ever seen. A procession was first formed in the river's bed, and on a given signal all dashed off, brandishing their spears and shields. Dressed in tobes of many colours, and sitting loosely on their gaily-caparisoned horses, they engaged in mimic contest with spear and shield, reining their horses upon their haunches when at full gallop, and with wild shouts flinging their spears into the air. Each warrior carried a short-handled whip with a broad raw hide thong, and with it lashed his steed unmercifully. Some of the riders went through regular circus feats, leaping from their horses when at full gallop, picking up objects thrown on the ground, and then remounting. After this had continued for some time they would gallop close to our zariba, and reining up, shout "Mort, mort" ("Welcome, welcome"), to which we replied, "Kul liban" ("Thanks").

Awad was killed fighting in Ogaden by the Reer Ali. This allowed Nur to establish himself at Burao and rule over the entirety of the Habr Yunis. The Baha Deria still did not concede defeat and would eventually choose Awad's nephew, Madar Hersi, as their successor following Nur's death. Sultan Nur convened a shir of the Habr Yunis and decided to draw lots to settle the dispute with his challenger Madar Hersi rather than continue the senseless infighting that had lasted since Hersi Aman's death. Sultan Nur won the draw and gave Madar Hersi 100 camels as compensation and was proclaimed the uncontested Sultan of the Habr Yunis. The reunified rule under one Sultan Nur would last until the formation of the Dervish Movement several years later in 1899.

Early Dervish period

Sultan Nur had been the architect of disturbances at Berbera and was the man who narrated the famous story of French Catholic missionaries in Berbera converting Somali children. According to the consul-general James Hayes Sadler this news was either spread or concocted by Sultan Nur of the Habr Yunis. Madar Hersi his former rival for the Sultan title had aided the Mullahs of Kob Fardod in recovering livestock that was previously looted by some of the Habr Yunis and this reignited after receiving aid from the Mullahs there notably Mohammed Abdullah Hassan. Upon his visit to Oodweyne in July 1899 Sultan Nur convened a great shir of the western Habr Yunis clans and called on them to join the new Dervish movement and upon their refusal he would leave to Burao and successfully rallied the eastern sections of the clan. The Dervish would declare war from Burao on September 1 of 1899. Madar was soon propagated as the legitimate Sultan by British authorities and managed the western sections of the clan throughout the period of the Dervish wars.

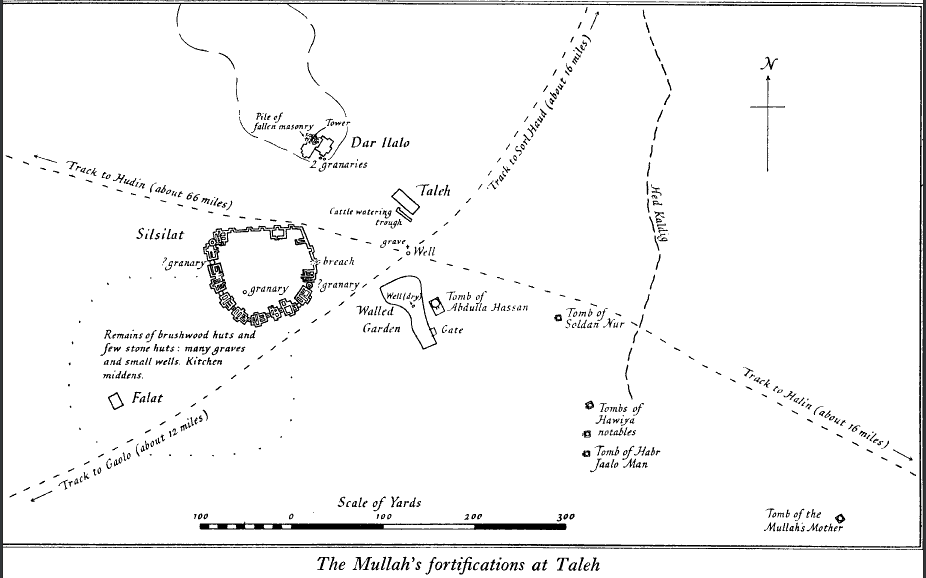
'The Dervisah fortifications at Taleh'. The tombs Sultan Nur, Mohamed Abdallah Hassan and unnamed Habr Je'lo and Hawiye notabales can be seen in the plan

The last intelligence report mention of Sultan Nur in the Italian archives was in 1907. After the death of Sultan Nur 1907/1908 in the Dervish camp at Taleh his son Dolal Nur ascended the sultanate in the dervish camp.

Sultan Nur was buried by his dervish in a large domed tomb in Taleh, his tomb predated the later dervish forts. His white tomb in the dervish capital is a testimony to his contribution to the movement. Few dervish founders are commemorated in Taleh, numbering only four.

William Archibald Macfadyen, a British geologist and the only scholar to study the structures of Taleh fort, mentioned the handful of tombs constructed by the dervish for their leaders and gave a detailed description of the tombs in 1931. In his article Macfayden only identified Sultan Nur's tomb by name out of the four dervish entombed in Taleh:

"South of the main cave-well is the considerable tomb of Abdullah Hasan senior, well plastered inside and out; it is now said to be empty. Adjoining this on the west is a walled garden with massive gateway and guard-house; the rest of the wall is not more than 5 feet high and plastered. There are still odd bushes and signs of cultivation to be seen, but the comparatively deep well in the middle is dry. To the east lies a row of four tombs. The most northerly is that of oneSoldan Nur of the Habr Yunis tribe; the next two, neither being plastered.and the first with the top left unfinished, are those of Hawiya notables whosenames my Somalis did not know. The most southerly tomb is that of aman of the Habr Jaalo tribe. The isolated tomb still farther east is that of'AbdullahHasan's mother. All the tombs are provided with narrow but very massive wooden doors, swinging about vertical extensions from top and baseof one side."

After the Bombing campaign of the Taleh fort and the Dervish retreat into Ethiopia, Tribal Chief Haji Mohammad Bullaleh (Haji the Hyena), a cousin of Sultan Nur, commanded a 3000 strong army that consisted of Habr Yunis, Habr Je'lo and Dhulbahante warriors and pursued the fleeing Dervishes. They attacked Muhammad Abdallah Hassan and his army in the Ogaden region and swiftly defeated them, causing Muhammad to flee to the town of Imi. Haji and his army looted 60,000 livestock and 700 rifles from the dervishes, which dealt a severe blow to them economically, a blow from which they did not recover.

Territorial expansion

During this period the Garhajis gained much new territory in the Haud region. These battles are today known as the Rayyad or Guba Wars. It was a volatile era that gave birth to some of the best known Somali poetry.

Historian Siegbert Uhlig commenting on the Guba poem writes the following:

From a historical point of view Ali dhuhs poem explicitly details the large gains in traditionally Ogaden territory and wells, and the looting of Ogaden camels by the Isaq. He details the scattering of the Ogaden clan, their forced migration southwards seeking refuge in the feverish river valleys, and even turning to hunting and farming- measures that were again considered very shameful usually only undertaken by slaves and low-caste Somalis and utterly demeaning for the once great pastoral Ogaden clan. The Ogaden, Ali recounts, have been forced to accept refuge with the clans that defeated them, especially the Habr Yunis, and cannot take revenge. The Isaq are portrayed as particularly callous and shameful in the way they parade looted Ogaden camels in front of their previous owners. Even in translation it is a very evocative poem".

B. W. Andrzejewski author of A Somali Poetic Combat writes :

During the period of administrative chaos which followed the war the Isaaq used their superior strength against both the Ogaadeen and the Dhulbahante. They looted many Ogaadeen herds, captured some of their wells and water-ponds, and dislodged them from a large part of their grazing areas in the Hawd. The Isaaq onslaught was so powerful that the Ogaadeen could put up little or no resistance, and did not even try to avenge their wrongs. Some of the clans, however, after being looted and pushed southward, developed a modus vivendi with the Isaaq and intermarried with them.

In his book The Galla in Northern Somaliland Ioan Lewis states :

The southwards expansion of the Somali from the shores of the Gulf of Aden still continues despite the establishment of international frontiers and Administrative control. It is very evident in the Northern Province of Kenya, and in the British Protectorate the Isaaq now appear to be pushing outside the territory at the expense of the Darod into the Ogaden and Haud.

The Habr Yunis advance into Ogaden territory was eventually halted by the intervention of the British protectrate authorities with assistance from the Ethiopian Empire, who considered the Ogaden their subjects and whose safety was their priority. In one incident the Habar Yunis looted 1330 camels from the Ogaden, but were pressured by the British and the Ethiopians to return the camels to their previous owners. The Habr Yunis obliged and promised to desist in their raids, but despite their promise they continued to successfully raid the Ogadens unhindered up until the British ceded the Haud to Ethiopia.

Rulers

The Habr Yunis Sultanate had eight rulers throughout its duration and the institution of Sultan still lasts today with the Baha Deria leading I conflict still not being completely resolved. The Bah Makahil maintain a well respected pretender although the current Sultan Osman Ali Madar of the Baha Deria is considered as the Sultan of the Habr Yunis.

House of Ainanshe

Ainanshe Hersi; Caynaanshe Xirsi
Sugulle Ainanshe; Sugulle Caynaanshe r. 18th century–
Deria Sugulle; Diiriye Sugulle r. 1797–1854
Hersi Deria; Xirsi Diiriye	Awad Deria; Cawad Diiriye r. 1879–1892	Aman Deria; Amaan Diiriye
Madar Hersi; Madar Xirsi r. 1890–1938	Hersi Aman; Xirsi Amaan r. 1854–1879	Ahmed Aman; Axmed Amaan
Ali Madar; Cali Madar r. 1938–1979	Nur Ahmed; Nuur Axmed r. 1879–1907
Osman Ali; Cismaan Cali r. 1979–present	Dolal Nur; Doolaal Nuur r. 1910–1917

=== Haji Sharmarke Ali Saleh, governor of Berbera, Zeila and Tadjoura ===
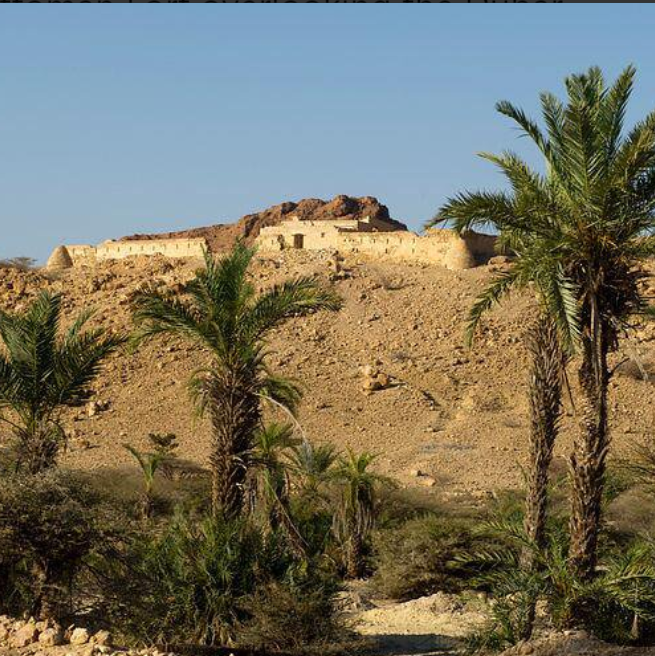
19th century fort in Berbera constructed by Haji Sharmarke Ali Saleh

The Habr Yunis exercised real power over Zeila and its adjacent regions and had established themselves as a coastal power, with Sharmarke Ali Saleh (Musa Arreh) solidifying and consolidating his power in governing Zeila, Berbera and Tadjoura. In 1841 Sharmarke with fifty Matchlock men, two cannons and an army of mounted spearmen managed to invade Zeila and depose its Arab Governor, Mohammed Al Barr. Sharmarke used the canons to fire at the city walls which frightened Al Barr's followers and caused them to flee. Sharmarke succeeded Al Barr as the ruler of Zeila and its dependencies. Sharmarke's governorship had an instant effect on the city, as he maneuvered to monopolize as much of the regional trade as possible, with his sights set as far as Harar and the Ogaden. Having secured Zeila, in 1845 Sharmarke moved on to Berbera which at the time was experiencing instability as a result of a war between the Habr Awal Reer Yunis Nur and Reer Ahmed Nur sub-clans over the control of Berbera's trade. Sharmarke took advantage of this rivalry and supported the Reer Ahmed Nuh who had since been expelled from Berbera. Sharmarke took over Berbera and built four Martello towers in the vicinity of the town and garrisoned them with 30 Matchlock men. A war ensued with in the city as Reer Yunis Nuh tried gain a foothold within Berbera, the Reer Yunis Nuh were no match for Sharmarke and his modern weapons and thus failed. The Reer Yunis Nuh were expelled and moved to Bulhar Sharmarke's influence was not limited to the coast as he had many allies in the interior of the Somali country and even further in Abyssinia. Among his allies were the Kings of Shewa. When there was tension between the Amir of Harar Abu Bakr II ibn `Abd al-Munan and Sharmarke, as a result of the Amir arresting one of his agents in Harar, Sharmarke persuaded the son of Sahle Selassie, the King of Shewa, to imprison on his behalf about 300 citizens of Harar then resident in Shewa, for a length of two years. In 1855, in an act seen as defiant of foreign powers, Sharmarke refused to sell to M. Richet, the French agent at Jeddah, a house in Zeila, citing "how easily an Agency becomes a fort", and preferring "a considerable loss to the presence of dangerous friends".

=== Burao Tax Revolt and RAF bombing ===
Captain Allan Gibb

Sections of the Habr Yunis once again clashed with the British in 1922 after a heavy tax was imposed upon them at Burao, the Hersi Osman clan revolted in opposition to the tax and this caused them to clash with other sections of the Habr Yunis and the British colonial government. In the ensuing riot and shootout between the British and Hersi Osman, Captain Allan Gibb, a Dervish war veteran and district commissioner, was shot and killed. The British fearing they could not contain the revolt requested from Sir Winston Churchill, then Secretary of State for the Colonies, to send troops from Aden and Airplane bombers in order to bomb Burao and livestock of the revolting clans to quell any further rebellion. The RAF planes arrived at Burao within two days and proceeded to Bomb the town with incendiaries, effectively burning the entire settlement to the ground.

Telegram from Sir Geoffrey Archer, Governor of British Somaliland to Sir Winston Churchill the Secretary of State for the Colonies:

I deeply regret to inform that during an affray at Burao yesterday between Rer Sugulleh and Akils of other tribes Captain Gibb was shot dead. Having called out Camel corps company to quell the disturbance, he went forward himself with his interpreter, whereupon fire opened on him by some Rer segulleh riflemen and he was instantly killed..Miscreants then disappeared under the cover of darkness. In order to meet the situation created by the Murder of Gibb, we require two aeroplanes for about fourteen days. I have arranged with resident, Aden, for these. And made formal application, which please confirm. It is proposed they fly via Perim, confining sea crossing to 12 miles. We propose to inflict fine of 2,500 camels on implicated sections, who are practically isolated and demand surrender of man who killed Gibbs. He is known. Fine to be doubled in failure to comply with latter conditions and aeroplanes to be used to bomb stock on grazing grounds.

Sir Winston Churchill reporting on the Burao incident at the House of Commons:

On 25th February the Governor of Somaliland telegraphed that an affray between tribesmen had taken place at Burao on the previous day, in the course of which Captain Allan Gibb, D.S.O., D.C.M., the District Commissioner at Burao, had been shot dead. Captain Gibb had advanced with his interpreter to quell the disturbance, when 1954 fire was opened upon him by some riflemen, and he was instantly killed. The murderers escaped under cover of falling darkness. Captain Gibb was an officer of long and valued service in Somaliland, whose loss I deeply regret. From the information available, his murder does not appear to have been premeditated, but it inevitably had a disturbing effect upon the surrounding tribes, and immediate dispositions of troops became necessary in order to ensure the apprehension and punishment of those responsible for the murder. On 27th February the Governor telegraphed that, in order to meet the situation which had arisen, he required two aeroplanes for purposes of demonstration, and suggested that two aeroplanes from the Royal Air Force Detachment at Aden should fly over to Berber a from Aden. He also telegraphed that in certain circumstances it might become necessary to ask for reinforcements of troops to be sent to the Protectorate.

James Lawrence author of Imperial Rearguard: Wars of Empire writes

[Gibb]..was murdered by rioters during a protest against taxation at Burao. Governor Archer immediately called for aircraft which were at Burao within two days. The inhabitants of the native township were turned out of their houses, and the entire area was razed by a combination of bombing, machine-gun fire and burning.

After the RAF aircraft bombed Burao to the ground, the Hersi Osman eventually acquiesced, agreeing to pay a fine for Gibbs death, but they refused to identify and apprehend the accused individuals. Most of the men responsible for Gibb's shooting evaded capture. In light of the failure to implement the taxation without provoking a violent response, the British abandoned the policy altogether.

=== Somali civil war and the Somali National Movement (SNM) ===
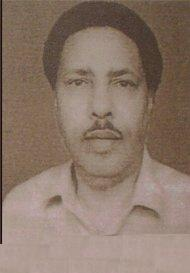
Abdirahman Ahmed Ali Tuur, first President of Somaliland

The Somali National Movement (SNM) was a 1980s–1990s rebel group. The SNM was organized in London, England, on April 6, 1981, by Hassan Adan Wadadid a former Somali diplomat and several other Isaaq intellectuals, he stated that the group's purpose was to overthrow the Siad Barre regime. The SNM gathered its main base of support from members of the Isaaq clan, who formed and supported the movement in response to years of systematic discrimination by the Siad Barre government.

Garhajis members served twice as chairman of the movement, with Colonel Abdiqadir Kosar Abdi and Abdirahman Tuur and once as Vice chairman with Hassan Adan Wadadid. Garhajis Commanders carried out many successful operations that led to the decisive victory of the group and to the downfall of the Siad Barre regime. Such operations included the Birjeex raid led by Colonel Ibrahim Koodbuur and Operation Mandheera led by Mohamed Hashi Lihle Lixle where they successfully freed hundreds of Isaaq political prisoners whose executions were imminent.

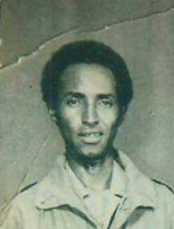
Colonel Lihle, commander of the SNMs military wing

Under the leadership of Abdirahman Ahmed Ali Tuur the SNM carried out a successful invasion of Northern Somalia overthrowing the Communist regime and establishing the democratic state of Somaliland. Abdirahman was sworn in as Somaliland's first president.

List of Habar Yoonis SNM leaders:

- Abdirahman Tuur
- Abdiqadir Kosar
- Mohamed Hashi Lihle
- Mohamed Ali
- Haragwaafi
- Madah-diin
- Ahmed Mire
- General Hassan Kayd

== Eidagale ==
The Eidagalle (Somali: Ciidagalle, Arabic: عيدَجلي, Full Name: Daoud ibn Ismā'īl ibn ash-Shaykh Isḥāq ibn Aḥmad)They are the traditional holders of the Isaaq Sultanate since the 18th century. The Isaaq Sultanate was established in the mid-18th century by Sultan Guled Abdi of the Eidagale clan. His coronation took place after the victorious battle of Lafaruug, in which Guled Abdi successfully led the Isaaq and was crowned by the Isaaq clan after defeating the Absame tribes. After witnessing his leadership skills, noble conduct and valiance, the Isaaq chiefs recognized him as their Grand Sultan but Abdi instead put forward his son Guled. Guled's Sultanate predates the Habr Yunis Sultanate, which broke off from Eidagale tutelage several decades after the start of his rule. Sultan Guled ruled the Isaaq from the 1750s up until his death in the early 19th century, where he was succeeded by his eldest son Farah. Sultan Farah further expanded the influence of the Sultanate by establishing ties with various Muslim polities across the Gulf, particularly the Al-Qasimi family whom he corresponded with in regard to military action against the British Navy who blockaded Berbera and temporarily cut off vital trade.

For centuries, the tomb of saint Aw Barkhadle, which is located between Berbera and Hargeisa, was used by the Isaaq clans to settle disputes and to swear oaths of alliances under a holy relic attributed to Bilal Ibn Rabah. As traditional leaders of the Isaaq clans, the Eidagale placed themselves as mediators during the disputes.

When any grave question arises affecting the interests of the Isaakh tribe in general. On a paper yet carefully preserved in the tomb, and bearing the sign-manual of Belat [Bilal], the slave of one of the early khaleefehs, fresh oaths of lasting friendship and lasting alliances are made...In the season of 1846 this relic was brought to Berbera in charge of the Haber Gerhajis, and on it the rival tribes of Aial Ahmed and Aial Yunus swore to bury all animosity and live as brethren.

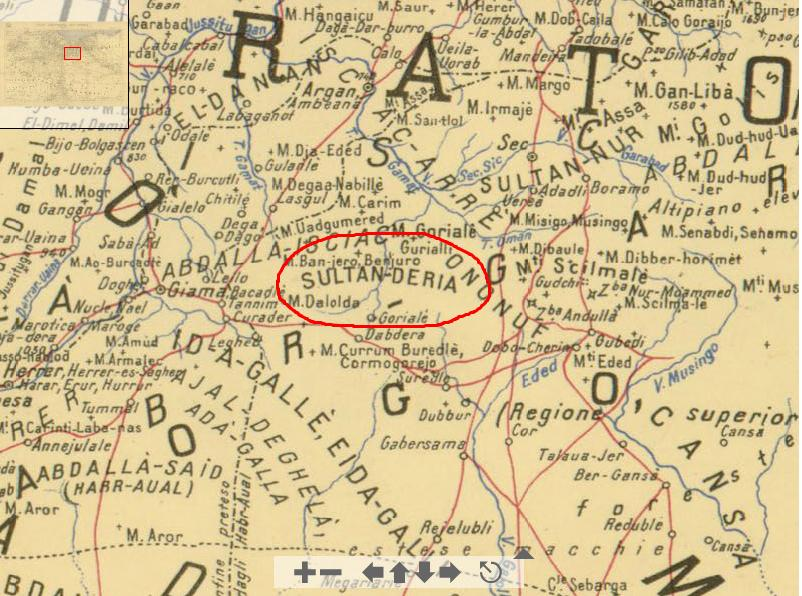
Sultan Deria's domain in an Italian map of the Horn, 1894

The Eidagale were renowned for their equestrian skills, and their devastating raids extended between the coast and the interior. According to Swayne, who traversed through Somaliland in the late 19th century, the Eidagale were amongst the clans most addicted to raiding:

The tribes near the northern coast most addicted to raiding appear to be the Jibril Abokor sub-tribe of the Habr Awal, the Mahamud Gerad Dolbahanta, and the Eidagalla, Habr Gerhajis.

Apart from their equestrian skills, the Eidagale are also famed for their eloquence in traditional Somali poetry (gabay), producing many famous poets such as Abdi Gahayr, Xasan Tarabi, and Elmi Boodhari. Historically, the Eidagale were viewed as "the recognized experts in the composition of poetry" by their fellow Somali contemporaries:

Among the tribes, the Eidagalla are the recognized experts in the composition of poetry. One individual poet of the Eidagalla may be no better than a good poet of another tribe, but the Eidagalla appear to have more poets than any other tribe. "if you had a hundred Eidagalla men here," Hersi Jama once told me, "And asked which of them could sing his own gabei ninety-five would be able to sing. The others would still be learning."

For centuries, the Eidagale (along with their Habar Yunis kin) were influential stakeholders in the long-distance Somali caravan trade. Eidagale merchants procured various goods from the Somali Region in present-day Ethiopia, such as livestock, acacia gum, myrrh and ghee, which were subsequently exported to Southern Arabia. The Eidagale caravan merchants founded several inland trade entrepôts in the interior, which also includes the modern city of Hargeisa, founded in the 19th century as a caravan junction between Berbera and the Somali interior.

Somalis of the Habr Gerhajis tribe arrive from Ogadain with feathers, myrrh, gum, sheep, cattle, and ghee, carrying away in exchange piece goods; they also make four trips in the season; they remain for less than a month, and during their stay reside with fellow-tribesmen, taking their meals in the mokhbâzah or eating-house.

== Sultans of the Eidagale (Isaaq Sultanate) ==
	Name	Reign From	Reign Till
1	Guled Abdi (Traditional Chief)	Mid ~1700s	Mid ~1700s
2	Sultan Guled Abdi (First Sultan)	late ~1700s	1808
3	Sultan Farah Sultan Guled	1808	1845
4	Sultan Hassan Sultan Farah	1845	1870
5	Sultan Diriye Sultan Hassan	1870	1939
6	Sultan Abdillahi Sultan Deria	1939	1967
7	Sultan Rashid Sultan Abdilahi	1967	1969
8	Sultan Abdiqadir Sultan Rashid	1969	1975
9	Sultan Mohamed Sultan Abdikadir	1975	2021
10	Sultan Daud Sultan Mohamed	2021	

== Clan Tree ==
A summarized clan family tree of the major Garhajis subclan of Habar Yunis is presented below.

- Sheikh Ishaaq Bin Ahmed (Sheikh Ishaaq)
  - Habar Habuusho
    - Ahmed (Tol-Ja'lo)
    - Muuse
    - Ibrahiim (Sanbuur)
    - Mahammad ('Ibraan)
  - Habar Magaadle
    - Abdirahman(Habar Awal)
    - Ayub
    - Muhammud (Arap)
    - Ismail (Garhajis)
      - Said (Habar Yunis)
        - Ali Said
          - Logeh Ali
          - Baleh Ali
          - Haji Salah Ali
            - Farah Haji
            - Hasan Haji
              - Samatar Hasan
              - 'Uthman Hasan
              - Samakab Hasan
              - Abdi Hasan
              - Abdullah Hasan
              - Ziyad Hasan
        - Arreh Said
          - Ishaq Arreh
            - Abdalle Ishaq
            - Qaasim Ishaq
            - Kalil Ishaq
          - Musa Arreh
            - Hassan Musa
            - Ibrahim Musa
            - Damal Musa (Dir Roble)
          - Ismail Arreh
            - Sa'ad Yunis
              - Mahamoud Sa'ad
              - Hasan (Barkad) Sa'ad
              - Mohammed (Idrays) Sa'ad
            - Musa Ismail
              - Salah Musa (Turwa)
              - Mohammed Musa (Urursuge)
              - Yunis Musa
            - Abdallah Ismail
              - Idris (Idrays)
                - Musa Idris
                - Mahamad Idris
                - Sa'eed Idris
              - Musa Abdallah
                - Mohammed Musa
                  - Farah Mohammed
                    - Hasan Farah
                    - Hussein Farah (Ba Gumaron)
                    - Allamagan Farah
                    - Jibril Farah
                    - 'Ali Farah
                      - Hasan 'Ali
                      - Omar 'Ali
                      - 'Amar 'Ali
                      - 'Abdallah 'Ali
                - Logeh Musa
                  - Abokor Logeh
                    - Musa Abokor
                    - 'Ali Abokor
                      - Hasan 'Ali
                      - Hagar 'Ali
                    - Egal Abokor
                      - Mohammed Egal
                      - Hassan Egal (Rer Diriyeh)
                      - Bayle Egal
                      - Maax Egal (Rer Maah)
              - Omar Abdallah
                - Kalil Omar
                - Ugadh Omar
                - Adan Omar
                  - Elmi Adan
                  - Egal Adan
                  - Mohamed Adan
                    - Roble Mohamed (Arabala)
                    - Hildid Mohamed
                      - Hussein Hildid(Rer Hussein)
                      - Hassan Hildid (Gumbur)
                      - Abokor Hildid
                      - Osman Hildid
                        - Abdi Osman (Ba Dhulbahante)
                        - Ali Osman (Ba Dhulbahante)
                        - Mumin Osman (Rer Mumin)
                        - Hersi Osman
                          - Fahiya Hersi
                          - Warsama Hersi
                          - Ali Hersi
                          - Yusuf Hersi
                          - Hildid Hersi
                          - Said Hersi
                            - Warsama Said (Rer Waraba)
                            - Weid said (Rer Waid)
                            - Egal Said
                          - Abdi Hersi
                          - Ainanshe Hersi (the Sultanate is currently held by them.)
                            - Sugulleh Ainashe (Sultan Sugulleh Ainashe)
                            - Eise Ainanshe
                            - Wa’ays Ainanshe
                            - Suban Ainanshe
                            - Abdi Ainanshe
                            - Egal Ainanshe
                            - Omar Ainanshe
                            - Koshin Ainanshe
                            - Maygag Ainanshe
                            - Butiye Ainanshe
                            - Ahmed Ainanshe
                            - Farah Ainanshe
                            - Samaale Ainanshe
                            - Hersi Ainanshe
                            - Guled Ainanshe
                            - Gutale Ainanshe
                            - Liibaan Ainanshe

A summarised clan family tree of the major Garhajis subclan of the Eidagale clan is presented below;

- Ismail (Garhajis)
  - Daoud (Eidagalle)
    - Mohammed Daoud (Guyobe)
      - Ali Mohammed
      - Urkurag Mohammed
        - Ali Urkurag
          - Ismail Cali (Gadhwayn)
          - Fiqi Sa'ad Aali
          - Mahamoud Ali
          - Ahmed Ali
    - Abokor Daoud
      - Issa Abokor
      - Bilaal Abokor
    - Muse Daoud
      - Abokor Muse
      - Abdirahman Muse
        - Yunis Abdirahman (Dan-Wadaago)
        - Abdulle Abdirahman
          - Mohamed Abdulle (Dan-Wadaago)
          - Ibrahim Abdulle
            - Kul Ibrahim
              - Abdi Ibrahim(Abdi Dheere)(Baho Deeqsi)
            - Abokor Ibrahim
              - Iidle Ibrahim (Rer Iidle)(Baho deeqsi)
              - Hussein Abokor (Gaashaanbuur)
                - Hamud Matan
                - Roble Matan
                - Adan Matan
                  - Burale Adan
                  - Abane Adan
                  - Barre Adan
                  - Abdille Adan
                  - Damal Adan
                    - Gobdon Damal
                      - Deria Damal (Dhamal Yar Yar)
                      - Fatah Damal (Dhamal Yar Yar)
                      - Gabib Damal (Dhamal Yar Yar)
                      - Hode Damal (Dhamal Yar Yar)
                      - Esa Damal
                        - Liban Esa
                        - Hassan Esa
                        - Abdi Esa
                          - Abdi Barri
                          - Adan Abdi
                          - Guled Abdi (Rer Guled)
                            - Yusuf Guled
                            - Roble Guled
                            - Jama Guled
                            - Deria Guled
                            - Egal Guled
                            - Gatah Guled
                            - Farah Guled
                            - Dualeh Guled
                            - Abdi Guled
                            - Ali Guled
                            - Warfaa Guled

== Notable people ==
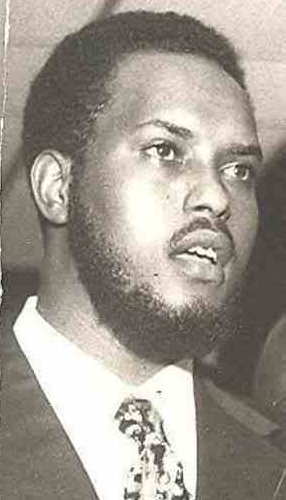
Abdiqadir Kosar Abdi, third Chairman of the SNM

- Abdillahi Deria – 5th Grand Sultan of the Isaaq clan and anti-colonial figurehead
- Abdillahi Diiriye Guled - Literary scholar and discoverer of the Somali prosodic system
- Abdirahman Ahmed Ali Tuur – the first President of Somaliland and the last Somali National Movement(SNM) Chairman
- Abdirahman Mohamed Abdullahi – former Speaker of the House of Representatives of Somaliland and the current chairman of Wadani political party
- Abdisalam Yasin Mohamed – Prominent Somali intellectual and one of the founding fathers of the SNM
- Abdullahi Qarshe – Somali musician, poet and playwright; known as the "father of Somali music"
- Abdiqadir Kosar Abdi – Former chairman of the SNM and army colonel
- Amina Moghe Hersi – prominent businesswoman and wealthiest Somali woman
- Ali Ismail Yacqub - First Minister of Defence for the Somali Republic
- Awad Deria – 5th Sultan of the Habr Yunis clan
- Deria Hassan – 4th Grand Sultan of the Isaaq clan
- Deria Sugulleh Ainashe – 2nd Sultan of the Habr Yunis clan
- Guled – 1st Grand Sultan of the Isaaq clan
- Guled Haji – wise sage and elder of the Habr Yunis
- Elmi Boodhari – Somali poet and pioneer also known as the “King of Romance”
- Faysal Ali Warabe – chairman of UCID party (Justice and Development party of Somaliland)
- Farah Guled – 2nd Grand Sultan of the Isaaq clan
- Fowsiyo Yusuf Haji Adan – former Foreign Minister of Somalia and MP in Federal Parliament
- Hersi Aman – 3rd Sultan of the Habr Yunis clan
- Hassan Adan Wadadid – Somali Republic ambassador to Saudi Arabia and Pakistan and one of the original founders and Vice Chairman of the Somali National Movement
- Hassan Farah – 3rd Grand Sultan of the Isaaq clan
- Hassan Ismail Yusuf – Somali politician and served as the Minister of Health of Somaliland
- Hussein Arab Isse – formed Minister of Defence of Somalia and Deputy Prime Minister of Somalia from July 20, 2011, to November 4, 2012
- Hussein Mohamed Mohamoud(Hussein Hog) – is a Somali politician. He is the former Minister of Health of Somaliland, from July 2010 to June 2013.
- Hussein Hasan – famous poet & warrior
- Hussein Mohammed Adam (Tanzania) - foremost Somali intellectual and scholar who founded the Somali Studies International Association (SSIA)
- Jama Mohamed Ghalib – former Police Commissioner of the Somali Democratic Republic, Secretary of Interior, Minister of Labor and Social Affairs, Minister of Local Government and Rural Development, Minister of Transportation, and Minister of Interior
- Mohamed Ainanshe Guled - Vice president of the Somali Democratic Republic from 1969 to 1971
- Mohamed Bullaleh - Prominent 20th Century tribal chief and commander of the Hagoogane raid that destroyed Dervish movement
- Mohamed Hashi Lihle - Colonel of the SNA and later the commander of the military wing of the Somali National Movement
- Mohamed Mooge Liibaan – prominent Somali instrumentalist and vocalist
- Ahmed Mooge Liibaan – prominent Somali instrumentalist and vocalist
- Mohamed Ali - Somali military commander and revolutionary. He is known for his leadership within Western Somali Liberation Front, Afraad and later the Somali National Movement.
- Mona Kosar Abdi – news anchor for ABC's Good Morning America
- Muhumed Hassan Jama, Governor of Awdal region
- Nur Ahmed Aman – 4th sultan of the Habr Yunis and one of the founders of the Somali Dervish movement
- Osman Jama Ali - Prime Minister of Somalia under the Transitional National Government and former Deputy Prime Minister of Somalia
- Ahmed Mohamed Diriye – is a Somalilander politician and the current Minister of Education and Science of Somaliland.
- Ridwan Hirsi Mohamed – Former Deputy Prime Minister of Somalia and Former Minister of Religious Affairs of Somalia.
- Said Sulub Mohamed – Somali politician, who is currently serving as the Minister of Livestock and Fisheries of Somaliland.
- Sharmarke Ali Saleh 1775-1861 – governor of Berbera, Zeila and Tadjoura
- Adan Ahmed Elmi - 4th Agricultural Minister of Somaliland
- Salah Ahmed Jama - Current Deputy Prime Minister of the Federal Government of Somalia
- Yasin Handule Wais religious scholar and founder of Somaliland's first Islamic party in the mid 20th century
