= Tuur =

Tuur may refer to:

- Abdirahman Ahmed Ali Tuur (1931-2003), Somalian politician
- Regilio Tuur (1967), Dutch boxer
- Regillio Tuur (1986), Belgian-born Surinamese footballer
- Erkki-Sven Tüür (1959), Estonian composer
- Mihkel Tüür (1976), Estonian architect
