= Mohamed Hashi Lihle =

Somali military leader

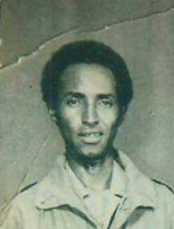

Commander of the Somali National Movement

Personal details
- Born: 1945 Go'da Weyn, Togdheer, Somali Republic (now Somaliland)
- Died: 17 October 1984 (aged 38–39) Burco-Durrey, Ethiopia
- Children: 2
- Occupation: Military commander

Military service
- Allegiance: Somali Democratic Republic (1964-1981); Somali National Movement (1981-1984)
- Branch/service: Somali National Army
- Years of service: 1964 – 1984
- Rank: Colonel

Mohamed Hashi Dirie (Somali: Maxamed Xaashi Diiriye Lixle), commonly known as Lihle (Somali: Lixle) was a Somali military leader, colonel of the Somali National Army and later the commander of the military wing of the Somali National Movement. He belonged to the Farah Mohamed branch of the Musa Abdallah subclan of the Habr Yunis.

== Early life and career ==
Lihle was born in Go'dda Weyn in Togdheer in 1945 as the youngest of five children, born to Hashi Dirie and Ardo Dirie. He lived in Go'dda Weyn until he was 8 years old when the family moved to Burco where his father worked as a military sergeant, and Lihle attended his Quranic education in Burco. The name “Lihle” means “Equal to Six”, and is rather a nickname than a given name, “Lixle” comes from the Somali word “Lix” meaning “six”, it was given to him by his school teacher. When Lihle was attending school, he got into a fight with six other students, where he fought them all off. His teacher broke them apart, amazed, he then said “This one is equal to six [lixle] if he fought off six men”.

Lihle attended the SOS Sheikh Secondary School for boys. He graduated in 1964 and Once he graduated he joined the Somali military in 1964. Lihle was among the top 6 students of his school, and those 6 students were was sent to the Soviet Union for further advanced-level training. Lihle specialized in Tanks, and Upon his return in 1969 Lihle was stationed at the Kismayo Military academy where he trained the next generation of army cadets, specializing in motorized and mechanized warfare. Lihle participated in the Ogaden War and was considered a war hero within the Somali Armed Forces. During the course of his army career he held the ranks of first and second lieutenant (Xidigle), Captain (Dhamme), Major (Gaashaanle), Lieutenant Colonel (Gaashaanle Dhexe) and Colonel (Gaashaanle sare). The latter rank is the third-highest a commissioned officer can achieve in the Somali National Army.

=== Somali National Movement ===
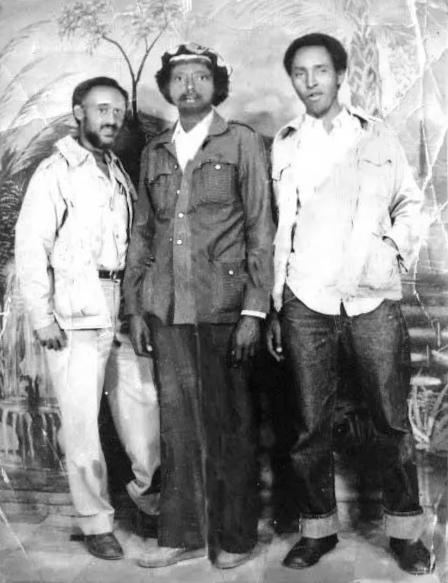
Abdillahi Askar, Ismail Daud Egal and Lihle

Lihle joined the Somali National Movement, an organization consisting mainly of members of the Isaaq clan. The SNM was created with the aim of liberating the northern regions from Barre's government. While still a colonel of the SNA he coordinated clandestine anti-government activity within the armed forces. In 1979 Afraad battalion leader and later SNM hero Mohamed Ali was arrested in Mogadishu for fighting against the Ogadeni WSLF faction, Lihle using his influence within the military released him from prison. Lihle acted as an inside man and facilitated the defection of Isaaq military officers and their safe passage to Ethiopia. He eventually defected himself and became head of the SNM's military wing. Lihle conceived, planned and executed the most successful military operation against the Somali government on 2 January 1983. Leading SNM fighters from Haud bases, he assaulted Mandera Prison near Berbera and released a group of Isaaq political prisoners. According to SNM sources, the attack freed hundreds of prisoners; subsequent independent estimates suggested that 700 political prisoners were released. At the same time, SNM commando units invaded the Adadley armoury near Berbera and escaped with an undetermined amount of arms and ammunition. It was considered the "most striking initial military success" of the SNM. Lihle's leadership is said to have created a more cohesive, highly organized and disciplined force.

Lihle's speech to the freed Mandera prisoners:

O prisoners, you are from everywhere.'- Now we will release you. You have three options to choose from: (1) whoever wants to join the SNM, as we are fighting the regime, you can come and join the Jihad (struggle); (2) whoever wants to go and join his family, we will help you get back home; (3) whoever wants to join the regime, you should know we pushed them back to Abdaal when we came; so go to them and we will not do anything to you until you reach them. But be careful: we might attack you later and then our bullets will hurt you. So choose one of these options.

New African Magazine in 1989 states:

The SNM is very popular among the Somalis especially in the Northern Regions. Within the six year period that they were operating from Ethiopia, they carried out many successful military operations and created military heros like Mohamed Ali, Colonel Lihle, and Captain Ibrahim Kodbur.

== Death ==
On 17 October 1984 the SNM commando units led by Colonel Lihle clashed with the SNA at the Somali-Ethiopia border town of Burao-Durey. The SNM suffered heavy losses and Lihle died on the battlefield. His death was considered a major blow to the SNM movement. Lihle is considered a hero in Somaliland and has roads and districts named after him.

== See also ==
- Mohamed Farah Dalmar Yusuf
- Hassan Adan Wadadid
- Abdiqadir Kosar Abdi
- Abdirahman Ahmed Ali

== See also ==
- Hassan Adan Wadadid
- Abdiqadir Kosar Abdi
