= Ahmed Ismail Abdi =

Somali politician

- Axmed Ismaciil Cabdi (Duqsi)
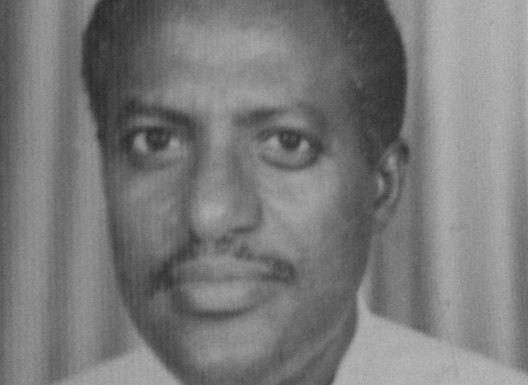
- Occupation: Politician
- Political party: Somali National Movement (SNM)

Ahmed Ismail Abdi (Somali: Axmed Ismaciil Cabdi (Duqsi)) is an initial member of Somali National Movement (SNM). His nickname is Duqsi (Dukhsi, Dokisi, Dukhsi.)

He is from the Habr Je'lo branch of the Isaaq clan.

== Biography ==
Duqsi was a member of the Somaliland National League (SNL), a national political party that existed before Somaliland's independence in 1960. Although the Somaliland National League was based in Burao, it was a national party with bases throughout the mainly Isaaq clan settlements in the former British Somaliland.

=== Somali Republic ===
In April 1964, Duqsi became a member of the Somali Parliament representing Burao.

In March 1966 he was appointed minister of state for planning.

In August 1966, he was appointed chairman of the Committee on Foreign Investments in addition to the minister of state for planning.

He stopped being a minister at least 1968, but had a member of the Somali parliament and gave a speech at the Nicollet House Hotel in the United States.

=== Somali National Movement ===
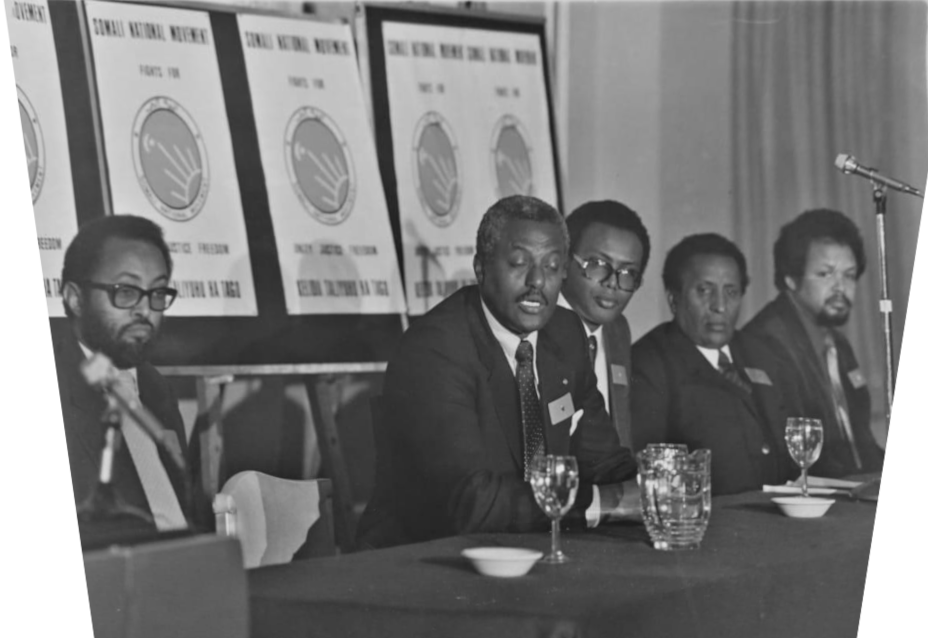
Declaration of the establishment of SNM in London. Second from left is Duqsi.

In Somalia, there was a coup in 1969, Siad Barre came to power; Siad Barre soon became a dictator. Duqsi then lived in Uganda.

Moves against Barre, Somalia's dictatorial president, were everywhere; in 1978, Duqsi was in contact with Hassan Adan Wadadid, Abdisalam Yasin Mohamed, Mohamed Hashi Elmi and others, mainly in Saudi Arabia. The Saudi group included members from many of the major clans of the Isaaq clan, including the Habr Je'lo, Garhajis , Arap and Habr Awal clans.

In April 1981, the Somali National Movement (SNM) was officially launched as an anti-dictatorship movement. The first chairman was Ahmed Mohamed Gulaid, and Duqsi became secretary. Participating in the press conference on the establishment of SNM were Hassan Adan Wadadid, Mohamed Hashi Elmi, Duqsi, and Abdisalam Yasin Mohamed. The meeting at this time was a calm one that did not allow local guerrilla forces and others to participate, and focused on appeals to the BBC and others.

The early SNM situation was complicated by the fact that Ahmed Mohamed Gulaid was a former member of the National United Front party, while Duqsi was from its rival party, the Somaliland National League. Also, the chairman, Ahmed Mohamed Gulaid, was from the Habar Yoonis clan, while Duqsi was from the Habr Je'lo clan.

Duqsi continued to base its activities in Saudi Arabia.

=== After Somaliland Re-independence ===
On May 18, 1991, Somaliland declared its restoration of independence; Duqsi was appointed Minister of Justice (Somali: wasiirka cadaalada) and served until 1993.
