= Regillio =

Regillio is a given name. Notable people with the name include:

- Regillio Nooitmeer (born 1983), Dutch-Haitian footballer
- Regillio Simons (born 1973), Dutch footballer
- Regillio Tuur (born 1986), Belgian footballer
- Regillio Vrede (born 1973), Dutch footballer

== See also ==
- Regilio
