= Z Unit =

Z Unit may refer to:

- The Royal Air Force component active during the Somaliland campaign (1920) between British forces and Somaliland dervishes, also known as "Z Force"
- Z Special Unit, an Australian-British-New Zealand commando unit in the South West Pacific theatre, also known as "Z Force"
