= Yasin Handule Wais =

Somali religious leader

- ىاسن حمدالله وعيس
- Born: Burao
- Organization: Party of Allah

Yasin Handule Wais (Somali: Yaasiin Xandulle Wacays Sugulle) was a Somali religious leader.

== Biography ==
Haji Yasin had spent years studying in Egypt and returned to the Somaliland Protectorate in 1956 with a goal to form a religious organisation that was vehemently anti-government and anti-Christian imperialism. The Somaliland Protectorate independence struggle gave rise to numerous secular and tribally oriented political organisations. Party of Allah was created in 1956 by Haji Yasin and other notable Habr Yunis religious figures with the goals of defending Islam and eradicating tribalism.

Brock Millman in British Somaliland: An Administrative History, 7920-1960 states :

It was effectively a wadads' party dedicated to protecting Islam, and abolishing both tribalism and her in the interests of Islamic purity. While the party had a small membership, it was considered to have great staying power. Its presence in the bureaucracy was substantial, given the high Habr Yunis presence. The Administration did not feel that it could ignore this faction...

Yasin attempted to put a stop to inter-tribal conflicts by founding a group that would transcend tribal allegiances while maintaining an emphasis on Islam as the core of Somali identity. Haji Yasin influenced numerous other anti-colonial movements such as Nasser Allah.

Professor of African studies John Markakis in The 1963 rebellion in the Ogaden states :

The founders of Nasser Allah were allegedly inspired by the example of Hadj Yasin Handuleh, a religious leader of the Habr Yunis (Issaq) tribe in the Haud. The Habr Yunis are the vanguard of an Issaq drive into the Haud, and have been locked into a bloody conflict with the Ogaden tribes in that region which continues to this day. The Habr Yunis were often also at odds with fellow Issaq tribes, and such inter-necine conflict played into the hands of the alien rulers of the Somali. Seeking an end to it, Hadj Yasin sought to create an organization that transcended tribal loyalties, as the nationalist parties claimed to do, but still focused on Islam as the essence of Somali identity and unity. He called it Hizb Allah (Party of God). A group of young Ogaden students and traders who came to know Hadj Yasin were prompted to follow his example. In the late 1950s they formed an association they called Nasser Allah. The fact that they chose to establish a separate organization for the Ogaden indicates the imperative of maintaining tribal distinctions even at the level of nationalist mobilization

== See also ==
- Ali Ismail Yacqub
- Nur Ahmed Aman
- Mohamed Ainanshe Guled
