= Regilio =

Surname list

Regilio is both a surname and given name. Notable people with the name include:

- Nick Regilio (born 1978), American baseball pitcher
- Regilio Jacobs (born 1987), Dutch football
- Regilio Seedorf, Dutch footballer from Suriname
- Regilio Tuur (born 1967), Dutch boxer

== See also ==
- Regillio
