= Ali Sugule Egal =

Ali Sugulle Egal علي سوغلي عيقال

Personal details
- Born: 1936 Hargeisa, British Somaliland
- Died: 12 January 2016 Abu Dhabi then buried in Hargeisa, Somaliland

Sugule (Somali: Cali Sugulle Cigaal, Ali Sugule Egal, Arabic: علي سوغلي عيقال) was a Somali poet. Sugulle is considered to be one of the greatest composers, poets and playwrights of the Somali language.

== Overview ==
Sugulle was born in 1936 in Hargeisa in former British Somaliland (now Somaliland) to an Isaaq family from the Habar Yoonis subclan. Sugule was against the Siad Barre regime who ruled Somalia from 1969 to 1991, that used the method "kill all but the crows" in Somaliland Sugulle wrote numerous plays, poems and songs against dictator Siad Barre that led to his imprisonment for several years.

Sugulle died at the age of 80 in Abu Dhabi on 12 January 2016 and was later buried in his hometown of Hargeisa Somaliland.

== SONGS ==
1. Waaba baryay bilicsan - Maxamed Axmed Kuluc & Hobolada Waabari

2. Af-qalaad aqoonta miyaa? - Xaliima Khaliif Magool & Xasan Diiriye

3. Dhaaxaan Gunnimo - Maxamed Suleman Tubeec

4. Ma biyohii na liqay baa - Faaduma Qaasim & Caasha Cabdow Maleeka

5. Hiddi Hiddi - Axmed Naaji Sacad & Hobalada waabari

6. Nin lagu seedow ha seexan - Xaliima Khaliif Magool

7. Maxaad taqaan - Xaliima Khaliif Magool & Hobolada Waabari

8. Hunu hunu hadal maaha - Khadiija Abdullahi Daleys
