= Frederick Bowhill =

Royal Air Force Air Chief Marshal (1880-1960)

Sir Frederick Bowhill
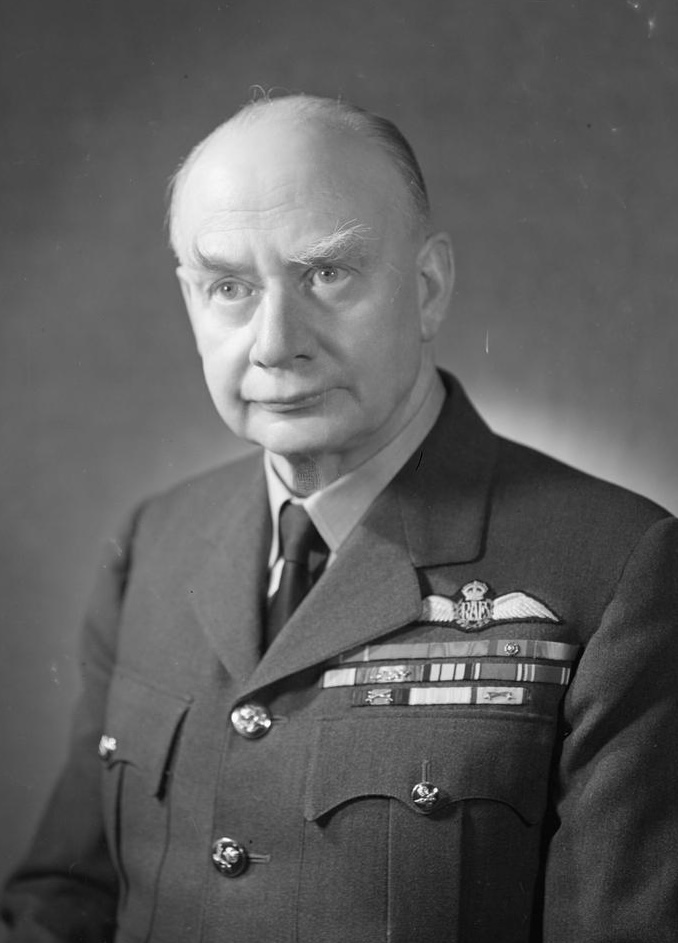
- Air Chief Marshal Sir Frederick Bowhill
- Born: 1 September 1880; Gwalior, India
- Died: 12 March 1960 (aged 79); Fulham, England
- Military career
- Allegiance: United Kingdom
- Branch: Royal Navy (1896–18); Royal Air Force (1918–45)
- Service years: 1896–1945
- Rank: Air chief marshal
- Commands: Transport Command (1943–45); Ferry Command (1941–43); Coastal Command (1937–41); Air Member for Personnel (1933–37); RAF Depot Egypt (1925–26); RNAS Killingholme (1918); RNAS Felixstowe (1918); No. 8 Squadron RNAS (1916–17); HMS Empress (1914–15)
- Conflicts: World War I Somaliland campaign World War II
- Awards: Knight Grand Cross of the Order of the British Empire; Knight Commander of the Order of the Bath; Companion of the Order of St Michael and St George; Distinguished Service Order & Bar; Mentioned in dispatches (7); Order of Saint Vladimir, 4th Class with Sword and Bow (Russia); Commander of the Order of the Redeemer (Greece); Grand Cross of the Order of Orange-Nassau (Netherlands); Commander of the Legion of Merit (United States); Grand Cross of the Order of St. Olav (Norway); Grand Cross of the Order of Polonia Restituta (Poland)

Air chief marshal Sir Frederick William Bowhill (1 September 1880 – 12 March 1960) was a senior commander in the Royal Air Force before and during World War II.

== RAF career ==
Bowhill started his career as a midshipman in the merchant navy in 1896. In 1912 he attended the Central Flying School and in 1914 he was given command of the seaplane carrier HMS Empress. He became Officer Commanding No. 8 Squadron of the Royal Naval Air Service in 1915 and Station Commander at RNAS Felixstowe in 1918. Later that year he commanded RNAS Killingholme.

After the war Bowhill was not to rest for long from operational service. In 1920 he was the Chief of Staff to Group Captain Robert Gordon for the highly successful Somaliland campaign. He went on to be Officer Commanding the RAF Depot in Egypt in 1925, Senior Air Staff Officer at Headquarters RAF Iraq Command in 1928 and Director of Organisation and Staff Duties at the Air Ministry in 1929. In 1931 he was appointed Air Officer Commanding the Fighting Area of the Air Defence of Great Britain and in 1933 he became Air Member for Personnel.

He served in World War II initially as Air Officer Commanding-in-Chief at RAF Coastal Command in which capacity using his knowledge of the sea he properly identified the likely position of the German battleship Bismarck using a Catalina flying boat allowing it to be sunk. He was then appointed Air Officer Commanding Ferry Command, then Air Officer Commanding-in-Chief Transport Command in 1943 before retiring in 1945.

Military offices
Preceded by Sir Edward Ellington	Air Member for Personnel; 1933–1937	Succeeded by William Mitchell
Preceded by Sir Philip Joubert de la Ferté	Commander-in-Chief Coastal Command; 1937–1941	Succeeded by Sir Philip Joubert de la Ferté
New title Command established from the Atlantic Ferry Service	Air Officer Commanding Ferry Command; 1941–1943	Command renamed Transport Command
New title Command established by renaming Ferry Command	Commander-in-Chief Transport Command; 1943–1945	Succeeded by Sir Ralph Cochrane
