= Hassan Adan Wadadid =

Somali politician and diplomat

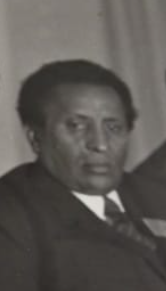

Minister of Rebuilding and Resettlement of Somaliland
- In office 1991–1993
- President: Abdirahman Ahmed Ali Tuur
- Preceded by: Position Established
- Succeeded by: Mohamed Barud Ali

Vice Chairman of the Somali National Movement
- In office 1982–1983

Ambassador of the Somali Republic to Saudi Arabia
- In office 1960–1969
- Prime Minister: Abdirashid Ali Sharmarke

Ambassador of Somali Republic to Pakistan
- In office 1960–1969
- Prime Minister: Abdirashid Ali Sharmarke

Hassan Adan Wadadid was a Somali politician and diplomat. He was the Somali Republic ambassador to Saudi Arabia and Pakistan during the 1960s. He was one of the founders of the Somali National Movement and served as the movement's first vice-chairman. Hassan belonged to the Rer Ainanshe sub-division of the Habr Yunis Garhajis clan.

== Career ==
Hassan was dually accredited to serve as Somalia's ambassador of Saudi Arabia and Pakistan during the 1960s.

After the 1969 coup, like many of the countries diplomats and politicians, he was given a lengthy prison sentence by the MilitaryJunta that took over the country after the assassination of Abdirashid Shermarke.

After being released he migrated to Riyadh Saudi Arabia where he and other prominent Isaaq diplomats, politicians and intellectuals would have clandestine meetings with the objective of over throwing the Siad Barre regime. This group came to be known as the Saudi group and would later on have correspondences with a London-based group of similar aims. In early January 1981 Hassan led a delegation of the Saudi group to London that included Abdisalam Yasin, Ahmed Ismail Abdi 'Duksi' and Mohamed Hashi Elmi. After many meetings the two groups would merge to form the Somali National movement. Hassan was the official spokesman of the newly formed group and on 6 April 1981 he announced the launching of the SNM. Hassan would go on to serve as the first vice-chairman of the SNM.

After the SNM's successful overthrowing of the Barre regime and the establishment of the republic of Somaliland in 1991, Hassan was among the selected cabinet of Ministers of the Tuur government. As the Minister of rebuilding and re-settlement of Somaliland, Hassan was tasked with co-ordinating the return of thousands of refugees who had fled to neighbouring countries and to facilitate the rebuilding of the country's infrastructure that was looted and destroyed by Barre's troops during the course of the civil war.

== See also ==
- Somali aristocratic and court titles
