= Abdiqadir Kosar Abdi =

Somali military leader

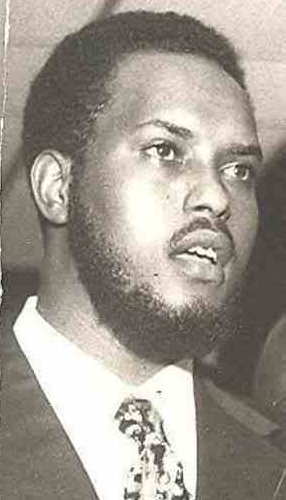

Chairman of the Somali National Movement
- In office November 1983 – August 1984
- Preceded by: Yusuf Sheikh Ali Madar
- Succeeded by: Ahmed Mohamed Mohamoud Death 12/July/1987, in feerfeer town

Abdiqadir Kosar Abdi was a Somalilander military leader. He was a Colonel of the SNA he was deputy commander battle of Godoy, one of the most skilled officer's in SNA and the third chairman of the Somali National Movement. He hailed from the Rer Warsama Said (Warabe) of the Habr Yunis sub-division of the garhajis Isaaq clan .

== SNM ==
Kosar was a colonel of the Somali national army and a highly respected veteran of the 1977 Ogaden War. In the early '80s, he was among the many Isaaq military officials who defected from the SNA due to the widespread nepotism and corruption of the Barre regime. Kosar joined the newly formed Somali National Movement. Following the 3rd SNM congress held in Harar, he became the leader of its Military wing where he trained and led SNM fighters on many operations against the SNA.
