= Ali Ismail Yacqub =

Somali politician

Minister of Defence
- In office 1961–1962
- President: Aden Adde
- Preceded by: Mohamed Haji Ibrahim Egal
- Succeeded by: Hilowle Moalin Mohamed

Personal details
- Born: 1930 Burao, Togdheer, Somaliland
- Party: Somali National League
- Profession: Sheikh; Politician; Lawyer

Sheikh Ali Ismail Yacqub (Somali: Cali Ismaaciil Yacquub; born 1930) is a Somali former politician, who served as the Minister of Defence of the Somali Republic; he also served as the Deputy Minister of Justice.

Sheikh Ali was an influential member of the Somali National League, the party that dominated the former Somaliland Protectorate's politics. In 1960 he was elected MP from the Burao district representing the Rer Ainanshe. In 1961 he was appointed Minister of Defence of the newly formed Somali Republic. The following year he led a delegation to Egypt and was a state guest of President Gamal Abdel Nasser, with whom he discussed military co-operation. In 1961 he ordered cross border raids into Ethiopia that destroyed several of their bases near the border. These skirmishes would later escalate and lead to the 1964 Ethiopian–Somali Border War. Ismail later joined the Somali National Congress (SNC) and was staunch Islamist, vowing to oppose the government until it was ruled by Sharia. He was one of the teacher of Hassan Dahir Aweys

== See also ==
- Osman Jama Ali
- Hassan Adan Wadadid
- Ridwan Hirsi Mohamed
