= Mohamed Bullaleh =

Somali tribal monarch

Haji Mohamed Bullaleh
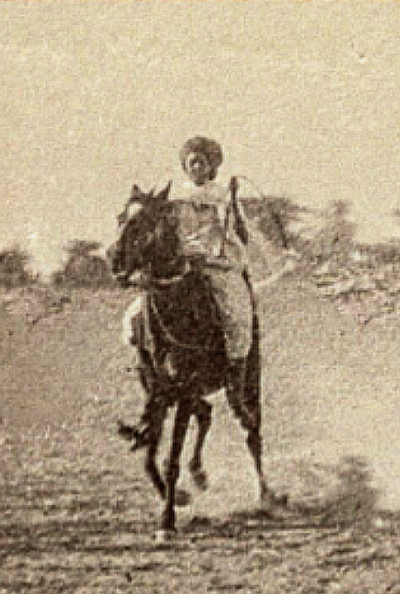
- Tribal chief Akil Haji Mohamed Bullaleh, also known as Haji Warabe, who led the Hagoogane raid that put an end to the Dervish movement in 1920
- Other name: Haji Warabe

Haji Mohamed Bullaleh (Somali: Maxamed Bullaale Baxnaan Axmed Caynaanshe) commonly known as Haji Warabe was an early 20th century Akil (chief) of the Habr Yunis Rer Ainanshe.

== Korahe raid (Hagoogane) ==
In the early 20th century during the Dervish wars, the British and Abyssinians came to an agreement that cross border camel raiding between the Somali tribes was to be banned and that the offending tribes would be punished by their respective governments. The Abyssinians only nominally having control over the Haud failed to meet their end of the agreement and this resulted in the Dervish and Ogaden alliance raiding with impunity while the Isaaq and Dhulbahante were unable to avenge the raids due to the British Camel corps restraining them and returning looted Ogaden livestock.

The secretary administrator of British Somaliland, Douglas James Jardine noted that the Isaaq sub clans inhabiting the Haud were in fact militarily superior and stronger than their Ogaden counterparts. After a series of Dervish-Ogaden raids, tribal elders went out in force to deal with the Dervish-Ogaden. The man to lead the tribal forces was Akil Haji Warabe who himself had previous qaurells with the Mullah.

After the bombing campaign of the Taleh fort the Dervish retreated in to the Ogaden territory in Abyssinia and the Mullah was able to attract followers from his tribe. The catalyst for the Hagoogane raid happened on July 14, 1920 when a Dervish-Ogaden force raided the Ba Hawadle sub clan of the Ogaden who were under the protection of the Isaaq on May 18, killing women and children in the process. Haji Warabe assembled an army composed of 3000 Habr Yunis, Habr Je'lo and Dhulbahante warriors.

The army set out from Togdheer, on the dawn of July 20, 1920, Haji's army reached Korahe just west of Shineleh where the Dervish and their tribal allies were camped and commenced to attack with them with force. The Dervish-Ogaden numbering 800 were defeated swiftly and only a 100 survived the onslaught and fled south. Haji and his army looted 60,000 livestock and 700 rifles from their defeated foes. This signalled the end of the Dervish movement.

During the midst of the Battle of Hagoogane (1920) Haji Warabe entered the Mullah's tent to face his adversary but found the tent empty with the Mullah's tea still hot. The Mullah had fled to Imi where he would die due to influenza shortly afterwards. Haji Warabe's Habr Yunis and Habr Je'lo warriors divided the livestock and rifles amongst themselves denying the Dhulbahante soldiers their share as mentioned by Salaan Carrabey in his Guba poem addressed to Ali Dhuh.

== See also ==
- Nur Ahmed Aman
- Haji Sudi
- Ibrahim Boghol
