= Regillio Tuur =

Belgian footballer

Personal information
- Date of birth: 8 August 1986 (age 40)
- Place of birth: Leuven, Belgium
- Position: Midfielder

Team information
- Current team: Robinhood
- Number: 18

Youth career
- 2000–2002: Mechelen
- 2003 – 2006: Lyra

Senior career*
| Years | Team | Apps | (Gls) |
| 2005–2007 | Lyra | 0 | (0) |
| 2007–2009 | Dürrenast | 10 | (0) |
| 2009–2011 | Robinhood | 16 | (1) |
- * Club domestic league appearances and goals as of 12 October 2010

Regillio Tuur (born 8 August 1986) is a former Belgian footballer of Surinamese descent who played for SV Robinhood of the Surinamese Hoofdklasse between 2009 and 2011.
