= Abdillahi Diiriye Guled =

Somali literary scholar

Abdillahi Diiriye Guled also known as Arale/Caraale (Somali: Cabdillaahi Diiriye Guuleed Warsame Guutaale) is a Somali literary scholar, Prosodist and is credited with the discovery of the Somali Scansion system.

== Biography and career ==
Arale is the son of Aw Diiriye Guled Warsame Guutaale, a famed poet who participated in the Silsilada Xaydha serial poems and who founded the town of Gashamo. Arale studied and majored in English at the Somali National University. While working as an English teacher, in his free time he studied Somali scansion. He also contributed to the Somali curriculum by writing the first Somali textbooks for the first generation of primary and secondary students that were to be taught in Somali, as opposed to English or Arabic. In 1978, he became a lecturer in the Somali department of language and literature of the Somali National university.

=== Somali scansion discovery ===
Arale discovered that the classical Somali genres of Geerar, Gabay, Jiifto and Hees, were not to be scanned by tones or stress patterns like the prosodic systems of the Greek and Arabic poetry. He shed light on the fact that Somali poetry should be scanned quantitatively and that the key unit in Somali prosody is not the placement of the syllable or the tonal accent but in fact the Mora. The Mora is properly defined as a unit on the line of poetry which is the temporal duration of a syllable containing a vowel. Arale first published his findings in the October star (Xidigta October) and later published his book Miisaanka Maansada which contained the first in depth theory of Somali prosody. Arale is considered a pioneer in Somali scansion and metre. His discoveries revolutionized Somali studies and numerous other scholars such as John William Johnson and Francesco Antinucci built on and revised his theories. Around the same time poet Gaariye, a friend of Arale, independently made the same discovery.

== Works ==
- Miisaanka Maansada (1975)
- Gabaygeena Miisaan (1978)
- Jiiftadeena Miisaan (1978)
- Gibil Xidh: Miisaanka Maansada Soomaaliyeed (2016)
