= Somaliland campaign (1920) =

Expedition against the Dervish movement in Somalia

British Somaliland expedition 1920
- Part of Scramble for Africa and the Dervish War
Date	January to 9 February 1920
Location	SSC (Sool, Sanaag, Cayn) region
Result	British and allied victory
Territorial changes	Fall of the Dervish State

Belligerents
United Kingdom	Dervish Movement

Commanders and leaders
Robert Gordon; Frederick Bowhill; Mohamed Bullaleh; Musa Egarreh	Mohammed Hassan; Haji Sudi †; Ibrahim Boghol †; Abdallah Shihiri; Ismail Mire

Strength
12 aircraft local gendarmerie 1 battalion (King's African Rifles)	Unknown

The final British expedition against the Dervish forces in Somaliland took place in 1920. Although the majority of the combat took place in January, British troops had begun preparations for the assault as early as November 1919. The British forces included elements of the Royal Air Force (RAF) and the Somaliland Camel Corps. After three weeks of battle and bombardments, the Dervishes were defeated, bringing an effective end to their 20-year resistance.

== Background ==
The British had previously conducted three expeditions to British Somaliland against the dervishes from 1900 to 1904 with limited or no success. In 1913, the Dervishes had previously defeated British forces at the Battle of Dul Madoba. Following the end of World War I, the British once again turned their attention to the ongoing violence in British Somaliland.

=== British plans ===
In 1919, the unrest in British Somaliland alarmed the British Government enough for Lord Milner, the Colonial Secretary, to consider sending a military expedition to the protectorate. The Chief of the Imperial General Staff (CIGS), Sir Henry Wilson, advised Milner that at least two divisions would be required and this was likely to cost several million pounds. Such a cost was seen as being prohibitively expensive in the conditions of post-war austerity.

Lord Milner then turned to the newly formed Royal Air Force (RAF), asking the Chief of the Air Staff, Sir Hugh Trenchard, if he could suggest a solution. Trenchard who at that time was most eager to ensure that the air force remained as a separate service, immediately proposed that the RAF should take responsibility for the whole operation. Milner argued that some ground troops would be needed and Trenchard replied that the local colonial forces which were already in Somaliland would be sufficient.

A meeting was arranged to discuss the coming campaign. In attendance were: Winston Churchill who was Secretary of State for War and Air, Leo Amery the Colonial Under-Secretary who deputized for Milner, Sir Henry Wilson and Sir Hugh Trenchard. Wilson was strongly opposed to a campaign being conducted by the Colonial Office and the Air Ministry which would draw upon the War Office's soldiers. However, when Amery and Trenchard stated that under no circumstances would they request troops, Wilson withdrew his objection and consented to the RAF taking the lead.

=== Order of battle ===
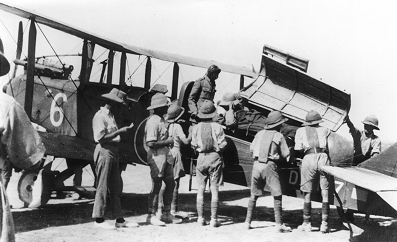
A Z Force DH9 being used as an air ambulance

By the January 1920, the following British forces were assembled:

- "Z Force" ('"Z" Unit' in some sources) provided by the RAF in the Sultanate of Egypt. The force consisted of:
  - 12 Airco DH.9A aircraft. The aircraft were shipped to Somaliland on the Royal Navy aircraft carrier HMS Ark Royal and were used for bombing. One was converted into an air ambulance.
  - A vehicle fleet consisting of ten Ford trucks, two Ford ambulances, six trailers, two motorcycles and two Crossley Motors light trucks.
  - 36 officers and 183 men, including the Z Force commander, Group Captain Robert Gordon, and his chief of staff, Wing Commander Frederick Bowhill.
- The Somaliland Camel Corps which was permanently based in the field as the local gendarmerie regiment.
- One battalion of the King's African Rifles.

== Actions ==
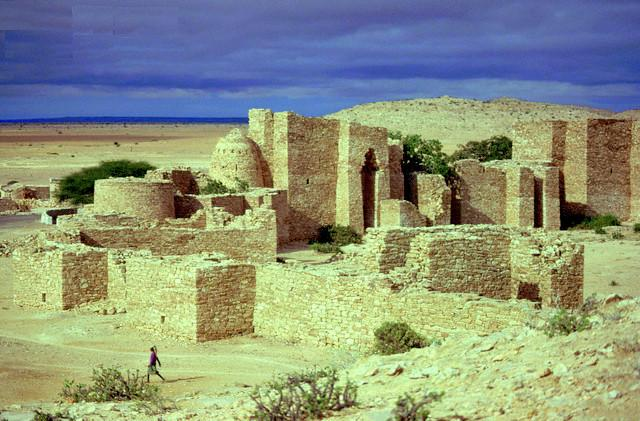
A fortified Dervish stronghold in Taleh.

By 1 January 1920 the Z Force had constructed a temporary aerodrome at Berbera from where they operated. On 21 January RAF aircraft bombed Jideli. Many of the dervish forces had never seen an aircraft before and were terrified by the aerial bombardment to the extent that they fled into the hills. It was also during that first bombardment that Hassan came close to being killed, narrowly avoiding death when an unfortunate camel shielded him from a nearby bomb blast. After the next five days had passed the Z Force had destroyed three Dervish forts; they then provided air support and communications for the ground forces. This battle established the tactics of aerial bombardment followed by attacks by ground forces, and of using aircraft to provide support for ground troops during concurrent attacks. These tactics are among the primary methods of wartime operations to this day.

On 28 January the Camel Corps occupied Jideli and Hassan retreated to his main fort at Taleh. After combined land and air operations, the British took Taleh on 9 February. Dervish forces suffered great losses and were scattered, his forts were damaged and he escaped with only four of his followers to the Ogaden. Hassan lost some of his greatest generals during the battle, including his right-hand man Haji Sudi and Commander Ibrahim Boghl.

=== Defeat ===
In the beginning of 1920, the British struck the Dervish settlements with a well-coordinated air and land attack and inflicted a stunning defeat. The forts of the dervishes were damaged and the army suffered great losses. The Dervishes retreated into the Ogaden territory in Abyssinia and raided the Ogaden Bah Hawadle clan, who were under Habr Yunis protection. Reacting to this incident, Haji Warabe of the Reer Caynaashe assembled an army of 3,000 warriors and set out from Togdheer. At dawn on July 20, 1920, this army reached Shineleh, where about 800 Dervishes were camped, and attacked them. The Dervishes were quickly defeated, 700 being killed in the battle. The few remaining survivors fled south.

== Aftermath ==
Haji and his army captured 60,000 camels and 700 rifles from the defeated Dervish. During the midst of the battle Haji Warabe entered Hassan's tent but found the tent empty with Hassan's tea still hot. He had fled to Imi and on 21 December 1920, he died of influenza at the age of 64.

== External links and further reading ==
- Official despatches and other reports covering the military actions:
  - "No. 31931". The London Gazette (Supplement). 4 June 1920. p. 6317. King's Birthday Honours 1920, including CMG for the Governor of Somaliland, Geoffrey Francis Archer
  - "No. 31974". The London Gazette (Supplement). 9 July 1920. pp. 7421–7426. Promotions, decorations and mentions in despatches for actions in Somaliland and elsewhere
  - "No. 32116". The London Gazette. 5 November 1920. pp. 10829–10832. despatch by Group Captain Robert Gordon, covering air operations.
  - "No. 32142". The London Gazette (Supplement). 26 November 1920. pp. 11777–11778. Promotions, decorations and mentions in despatches for actions in Somaliland
- Chakoten – The Danish Military Historical Society – The Anglo-Somali War 1901–1920 (in English and Danish)
- Bowyer, Chaz (1988). "Chapter Three: 'Z' Force and the Mad Mullah". RAF Operations 1918–1938. London: William Kimber. ISBN 0-7183-0671-6.
- Newton, R. D. (2019). The RAF and Tribal Control: Airpower and Irregular Warfare between the World Wars. Lawrence, Kansas: University Press of Kansas. ISBN 978-0-7006-2871-1.
- Omissi, David E. (1990). Air Power and Colonial Control: The Royal Air Force, 1919–1939. New York: Manchester University Press. ISBN 0-7190-2960-0.
