= Osman Jama Ali =

Somali politician

Osman Jama Ali عثمان جامع علي

Prime Minister of Somalia Acting
- In office 28 October 2001 – 13 November 2001

Deputy Prime Minister of Somalia
- In office 27 August 2000 – 14 November 2004
- President: Abdiqasim Salad Hassan
- Prime Minister: Ali Khalif Galaydh

Personal details
- Born: 1941 (age 84–85)
- Party: Transitional National Government

Osman Jama Ali (Somali: Osman Jaamac Cali [Kalluun], Arabic: عثمان جامع علي) (born 1941) is a Somali politician. He was Deputy Prime Minister of the Transitional National Government of Somalia and briefly served as the acting Prime Minister from October 28, 2001 to November 12, 2001. He hailed from the Rer Ainanshe branch of the Habar Yoonis.

== See also ==
- List of prime ministers of Somalia

== Notes ==
Political offices
Preceded by Ali Khalif Galaydh	Prime Minister of the Republic of Somalia; October 28, 2001–November 12, 2001	Succeeded by Hassan Abshir Farah
