= Abdisalam Yasin Mohamed =

Somalian academic administrator

Abdisalam Yassin Mohamed is a Somali professor and academic who had taken part in the establishment of the Somali National Movement (SNM). He holds a PhD in African Literature from SOAS University of London. He taught at King Saud University and King Abdulaziz University of Saudi Arabia. He is currently the president of Shifa University in Somaliland. His research was published in multiple academic journals, including the Journal of Muslim Minority Affairs (Taylor & Francis).
