= Abdirahman Tuur =

1st president of Somaliland (1991–93)

Abdirahman Ahmed Ali Tuur
- عبد الرحمن أحمد علي الطور
- Abdirahman Tuur in 1993

1st President of Somaliland
- In office June 7, 1991 – May 16, 1993
- Vice President: Hassan Isse Jama
- Preceded by: Office established
- Succeeded by: Muhammad Haji Ibrahim Egal

Chairman of the Somali National Movement
- In office April 1990 – May 1991
- Preceded by: Ahmed Mohamed Mohamoud
- Succeeded by: Position abolished

Personal details
- Born: November 6, 1931 Burao, British Somaliland (now Somaliland)
- Died: November 8, 2003 (aged 72) Hargeisa, Somaliland
- Spouse: Kinsi Ibrahim Osman Basbas
- Education: University of Exeter

Abdirahman Ahmed Ali Tuur (Somali: Cabdiraxmaan Axmed Cali Tuur, Arabic: عبد الرحمن أحمد علي الطور) (var. "Tur", "Tour", meaning "Hunchback") (November 6, 1931 - November 8, 2003) was a Somaliland politician who served as the first President of Somaliland from 1991 to 1993. Tuur previously served as the Chairman of the Somali National Movement from 1990 to 1991.

== Biography ==
Tuur was born on November 6, 1931, in Burao, then a part of the British Somaliland Protectorate. He hailed from the Muse Arreh sub clan of the Habar Yoonis.

He was one of the top students who graduated from the first Intermediate School in the British Somaliland Protectorate and was given a scholarship to Sudan in 1948 to study at the renowned Hantoob Secondary School. In Hantoob, he met and befriended some of the future Sudanese leaders like Jaafar Nimeiry, Sadiq Al-Mahdi and Hassan Al-Turabi. Abdirahman excelled both in sports (especially football and track) and academic studies. He later received an additional scholarship to study at the University of Exeter.

After successfully completing his university in the UK, Abdirahman returned and started his career as an Administrative Officer in Borama in 1956 and was elevated to the position of District Commissioner (DC) 3 years later (1959). In 1961 he became Governor of the Eastern Region (Burao) and then in 1964 the Governor of Western Region (Hargeisa). In that same year he joined the Ministry of Foreign Affairs where he was appointed in the following diplomatic posts:

- Sudan 1964-1968 and 1970-1971 Ambassador
- Ethiopia 1972-1977 Ambassador
- East Germany 1978-1981 Ambassador
- UAE 1981-1983 Ambassador

He later became the Chairman of the Somali National Movement (SNM), a guerilla force mainly drawn from his Isaaq clan, which was attempting to topple former President of Somalia Siad Barre's military regime. Although the SNM at its inception had a unionist constitution, it eventually began to pursue a separatist agenda, looking to secede from the rest of Somalia. Under Tuur's leadership, the local administration declared the northwestern Somali territories independent on 18 May 1991. He then became the newly established Somaliland's first President, but subsequently renounced the separatist platform in 1994. Tuur concurrently began instead to publicly seek and advocate reconciliation with the rest of Somalia under a power-sharing federal system of governance. In doing so, he also represented the interests of many other Isaaq members, who were against secession. Tuur additionally lent some support to the UNOSOM peace-building mission in the southern regions. Tuur was sentenced to death in absentia by the government of Mohamed Haji Ibrahim Egal for treason, Tuur went to Mogadishu, where he joined the government of Mohamed Farrah Aidid. However, after some disagreements with Mohamed Farrah Aidid, Tuur went to London where he lived until 2001, when he came back to Somaliland and declared he had accepted the secessionist position. He spent the rest of his life in his hometown of Burao. In 2003, during the 2003 Somaliland presidential election, Tuur campaigned in support of Dahir Riyale Kahin, who would end up winning and would be inaugurated as the third President of Somaliland.

== Death ==
Tuur died on November 8, 2003, at the age of 72 and was buried in Burao, Somaliland.
