= Reer Caynaashe =

Somali clan family

Ainanshe
Caynaanshe
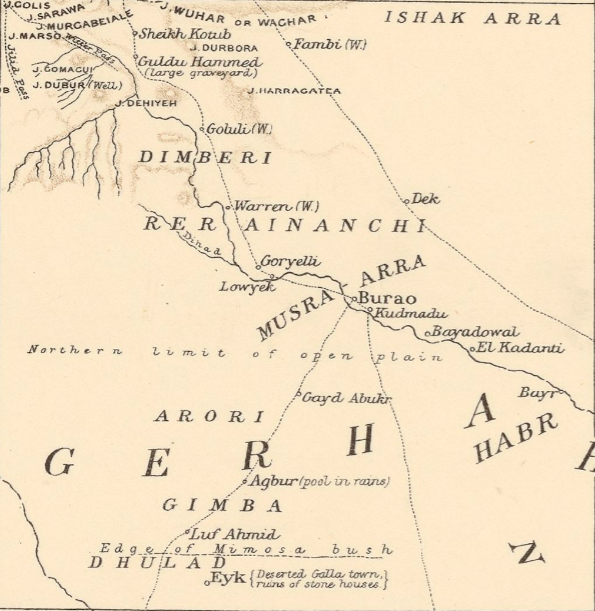
- 1880s Map featuring Rer Ainanshe in the Burao area

Regions with significant populations
- Ethiopia, Somaliland

Languages
- Somali

Religion
- Islam (Sunni)

Related ethnic groups
- Eidagale, Habr Je'lo, Habr Awal, Arap, other Somalis

The Reer Caynaashe also spelled Reer Caynaanshe (English: Rer Ainanshe) are a royal Somali clan and were the dynastic rulers of the Habr Yunis Sultanate. They divide into 17 major sub-clans that together form the Baha Ainanshe and Rer Sugulle, from the latter descend the rulers of the Habr Yunis Sultanate. They inhabit the Togdheer and Maroodi Jeex regions of Somaliland and the Danot and Misraq Gashamo regions of Ethiopia.

== History ==
=== Ancestry ===
The clan traces their paternal lineage to Said Ismail who was the grandson of Sheikh Ishaaq bin Ahmed, an Arab Islamic scholar of the Banu Hashim. They take their name from their 18th century ancestor Ainanshe who was the son of Hersi Osman of the Ismail Arreh and a woman of the Ali Said clan. He had seven brothers: Said, Fahiya, Hildid, Warsame, Yusuf, Ali and Abdi whom they shared the same mother and are together known as the Ba Ali in reference to their mother's clan. Ainanshe was the Chieftain of the Habar Yoonis clan. His first wife belonged to the Jibrahil clan and was the mother of his eldest sons Samatar and Sugulle who would go on to found the Ba Jibrahil Rer Sugulle which is the section of the clan that all the Habr Yunis Sultan's descend. Ainanshe's other wives Mun, Basla and Egalo bore him 15 sons who are collectively known as the Baha Ainanshe. The name Ainanshe means leader in Somali, its etymological origin is from the word Ainan which in Somali means the horse's reins, when combined with the Somali agentive suffix she it takes on the meaning of one who is holding the reins and leading. Ainanshe's tomb is located to the south of Burao in the town of Jameecada Caynaanshe near the Oodweyne district border.

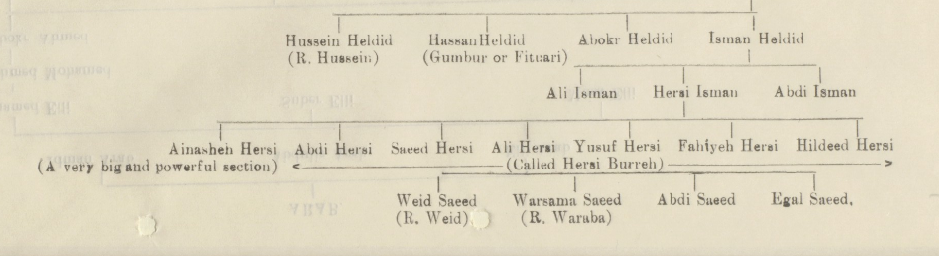
Hersi Osman genealogy by Lt. R.H Smith 1941

Enrico Baudi i Vesme who visited Burao in 1889 met the sons of Burao Chieftains Guled Ahmed Sugulle and Awad Gal, they relayed to him the following:

..They told me the story of their tribe. The chieftain of the Habr Yunis lineage, named Ainanshe, had 17 sons, one of whose name was Sugulle. First they stayed together, then they separated, forming one Rer Sugulle, who are the most numerous, the other 16 sons together, the Baha Ainanshe. When, a few years ago, there was war between Awad and Nur, the latter ended up settling in Toyo with part of the Habr Yunis.

Volume 7 of Etiopia rassegna illustrata dell'Impero describing the Rer Ainanshe, states :

Rer Ainanshe (Baha) and Rer Sugulle belonging to the Ismail Arreh are the center of the Habr Yunis group and also their backbone. Their prestige is probably the highest among the Somalis, and in number, compactness, fighting ability and raids may perhaps be considered to occupy the first place, together being equal to each other. The Rer Sugulle, in fact, belongs to the main branch of the Ainanshe but can be considered a separate group. The two are not at all intertwined but in case of a Habr Yunis movement the tribe may gather around these two sub-tribes.

=== Habr Yunis Sultanate ===
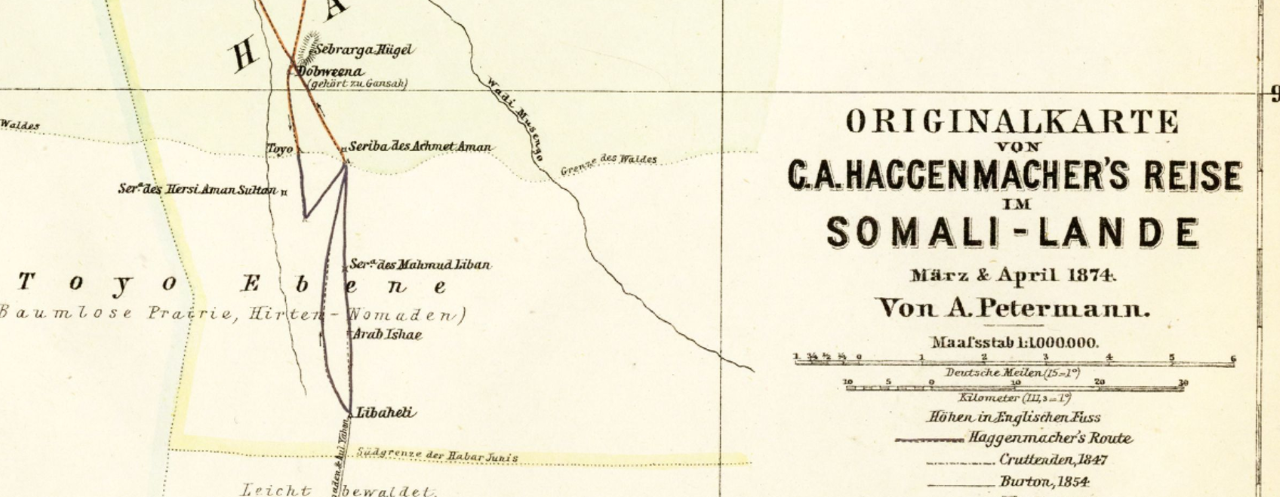
German Map from 1874 that features Sultan Hersi Aman's headquarters in the Tuuyo plain

The Habr Yunis Sultanate finds its roots in the Isaaq Sultanate which was established by the Rer Guled branch of the Abdirahman Musa of the Eidagale clan after the Isaaq successfully defeated the Absame clan at Lafaruug in the 17th century. With time the Habr Yunis and later the Habr Awal and Habr Je'lo would break from the Isaaq Sultanate with the Habr Yunis forming their own Sultanate led by Sugulle the son of the previous Habr Yunis Chieftain, Ainanshe Hersi. Sultan Deria Sugulleh would establish his capital at Wadhan (Waram) near the Sheikh pass and tax and administer the affairs of the Habr Yunis from the town. Large caravans bound for Berbera would pass through Habr Yunis territory through Burao and then Wadhan and proved a lucrative source of income for Sultan Deria.

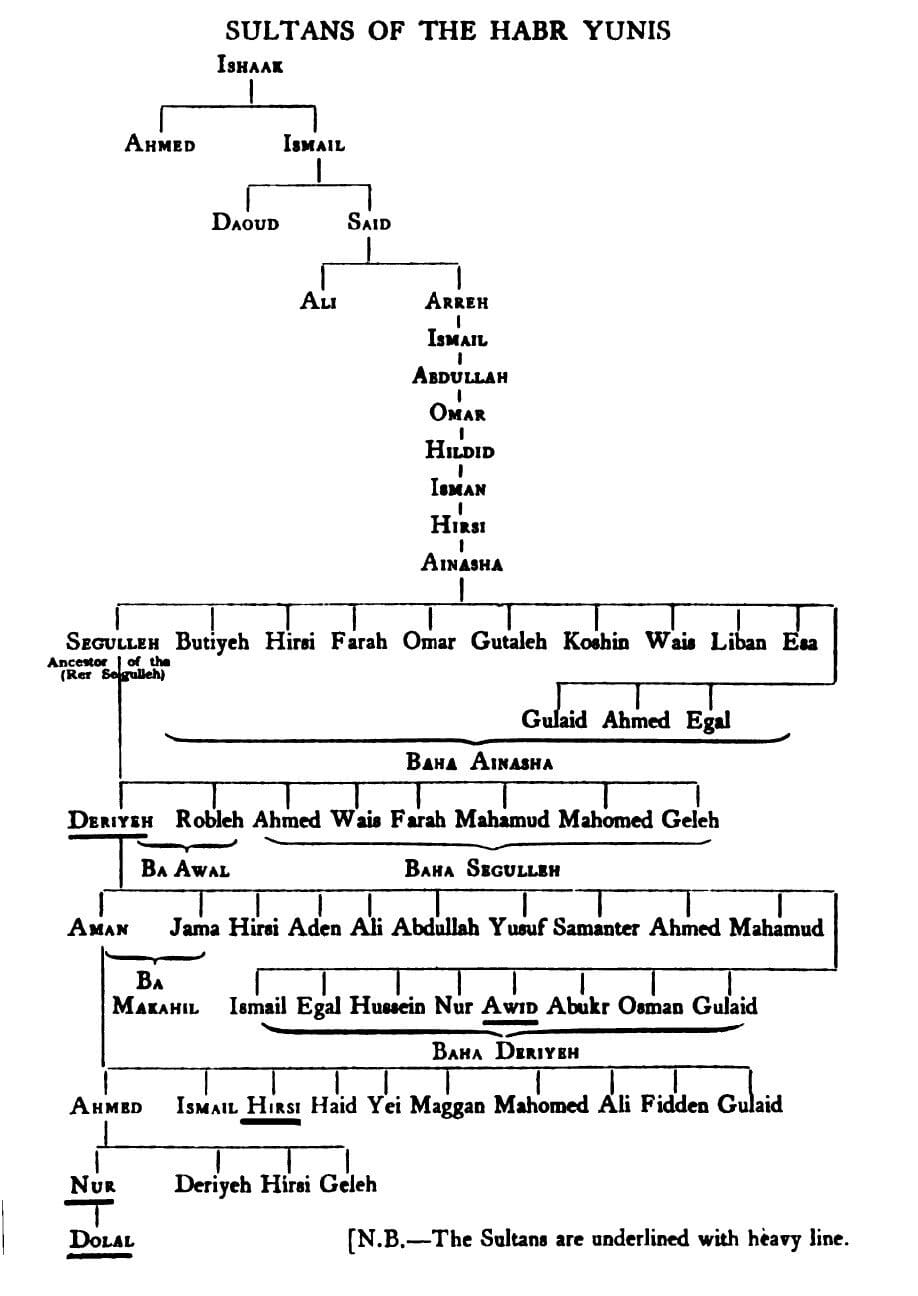
Genealogy of the Habr Yunis Sultans by Drake Brockman, 1912.

Deria was succeeded by Hersi the son of Aman Deria who had died before his Sultan father, he was an important Habr Yunis chieftain. Vesme Baudi travelling through Habr Je'lo country east of Burao in 1889 gives an account of Aman's tomb.

At nine o'clock we arrived at Baiadowal, on the Thug Dehr, a charming site, where the trees form a small forest, in which the most delightful coolness is enjoyed. A few hundred meters away there is a tomb surrounded by a palisade of tree trunks made with care. There rests a chieftain of the Habr Junis, by name Ohman-Dhirrin [Aman Deria]..his tribe had intermingled with the Habr Gialeh, and when that chief had died, they had made him that tomb with a palisade in memory of his great merits.

Hersi Aman is remembered for his successful conquests and expansion of Garhajis territory in the Haud. His reign was abruptly ended when he was killed in a battle against the kindred Baha Sugulleh. Ismail Mire in his famous poem Ragow Kibirka Waa Lagu Kufaa (Pride Comes Before a Fall) comments on Hersi's conquests, pride and desire to rule.

Kaysaha adduun Ina Ammaan koos dhan buu helaye
Ragba keeno geli buu is-yidhi waad u korraysaaye
Isba kii arsaa’ilay ma filin kamana yaabayne
Ragow kibirka waa lagu kufaa kaa ha la ogaado

— Ismail Mire Ragaw Kibirka Waa Lagu Kufaa
Translation:

With worldly pride Ina Ammaan gained a whole land
Let all men put the horse's bit in their mouths
He said to himself ‘You are on top’
But he didn't expect the one who killed him and was taken by surprise
Oh men. Pride comes before a fall. Let that be known

Dual Sultans Era

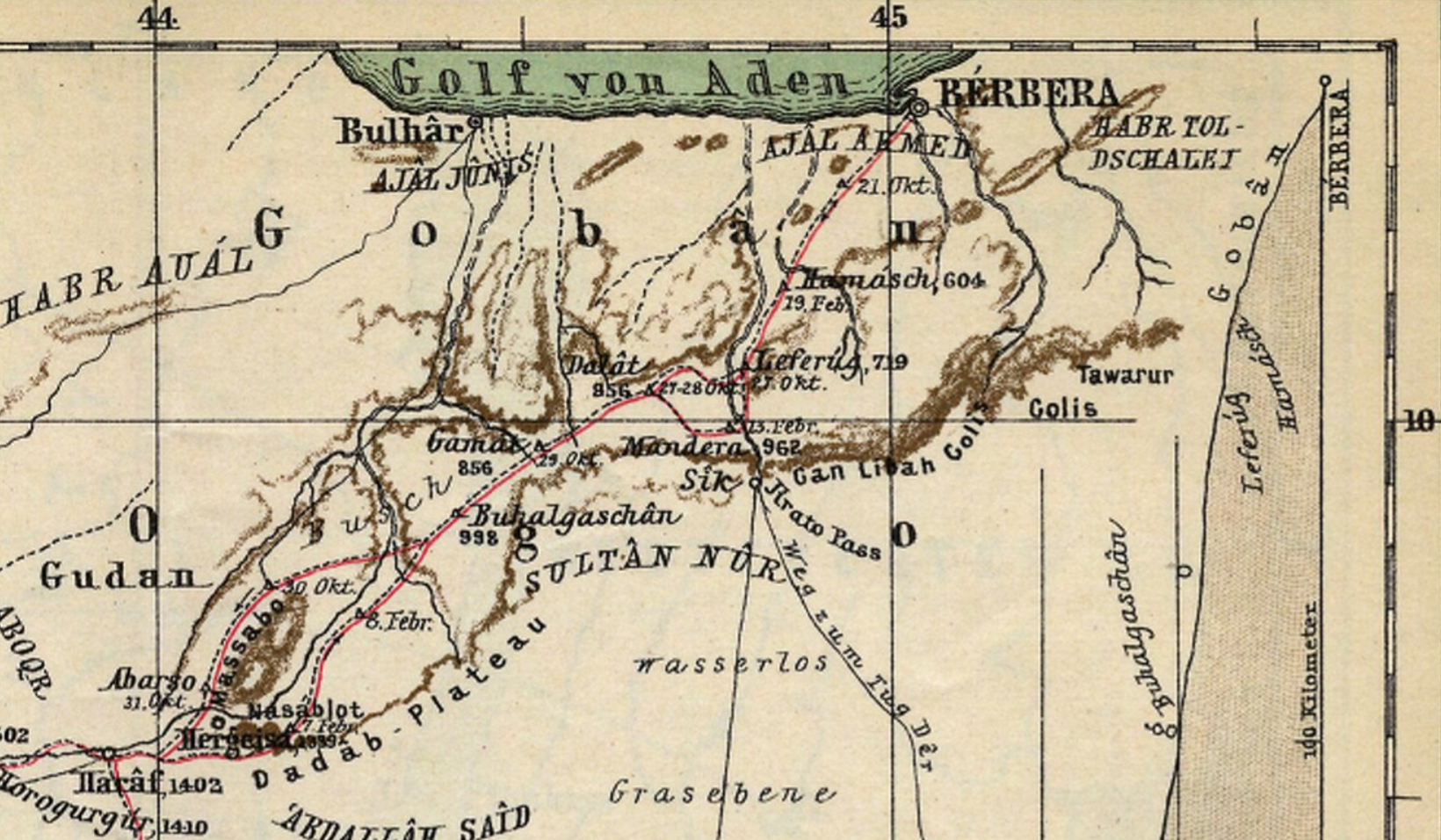
Sultan Nur's domains in Togdheer

After the death of Sultan Hersi Aman, the Baha Deria and Baha Makahil sections of the Sugulle dynasty vied for the Sultanship, which divided the Habr Yunis clan into two factions, the Baha Deria faction led by Guled Haji crowned Awad Deria a surviving son of the Sultan Deria Sugulleh. The Bah Makahil crowned Nur Ahmed Aman a young Mullah and nephew of Hersi Aman. Nur was initially uneasy and preferred his life as a Mullah rather than being the Sultan designate. The Habr Yunis were not interrupted by the British Somaliland protectorate which had been established in 1884 and was still largely relegated to the coast and its capital of Berbera. The two Sultans engaged in a lengthy war and divided the Sultanate's territory, where Awad ruled the Sultanate from his chosen capital of Burao and Nur from the Tuuyo plains and Oodweyne.

Frank Linsly James visited Sultan Awad at Burao in 1884 and witnessed the dissenting situation between the two Sultans. Describing the political situation in the region and frequent raids between the two rival Rer Sugulleh factions and their allied Habr Yunis subclans

It appeared the great Habr Gerhajis tribe was divided into two rival factions, the one owning allegiance to Sultan Owd, the other to his cousin, Sultan Noor. Between these two the country was about evenly divided, and the border-line was an everlasting scene of wars and rumours of wars, cattle raids, and attempted murders.

The Haber-Gerhajis tribe had formerly been under one Sultan and were very powerful, making frequent raids into Ogadayn, but on his death, two cousins, Awad and Nur, divided the country between them.

Awad was killed fighting in Ogaden by the Reer Ali. This allowed Nur to establish himself at Burao and rule over the entirety of the Habr Yunis. The Baha Deria still did not concede defeat and would eventually choose Awad's nephew, Madar Hersi, as their successor following Nur's death. Sultan Nur convened a shir of the Habr Yunis and decided to draw lots to settle the dispute with his challenger Madar Hersi rather than continue the senseless infighting that had lasted since Hersi Aman's death. Sultan Nur won the draw and gave Madar Hersi 100 camels as compensation and was proclaimed the uncontested Sultan of the Habr Yunis. The reunified rule under one Sultan Nur would last until the formation of the Dervish Movement several years later in 1899.

Early Dervish period

Sultan Nur had been the architect of disturbances at Berbera and was the man who narrated the famous story of French Catholic missionaries in Berbera converting Somali children. According to the consul-general James Hayes Sadler this news was either spread or concocted by Sultan Nur of the Habr Yunis. Madar Hersi his former rival for the Sultan title had aided the Mullahs of Kob Fardod in recovering livestock that was previously looted by some of the Habr Yunis and this reignited after receiving aid from the Mullahs there notably Mohammed Abdullah Hassan. Upon his visit to Oodweyne in July 1899 Sultan Nur convened a great shir of the western Habr Yunis clans and called on them to join the new Dervish movement and upon their refusal he would leave to Burao and successfully rallied the eastern sections of the clan. The Dervish would declare war from Burao on September 1 of 1899. Madar was soon propagated as the legitimate Sultan by British authorities and managed the western sections of the clan throughout the period of the Dervish wars.

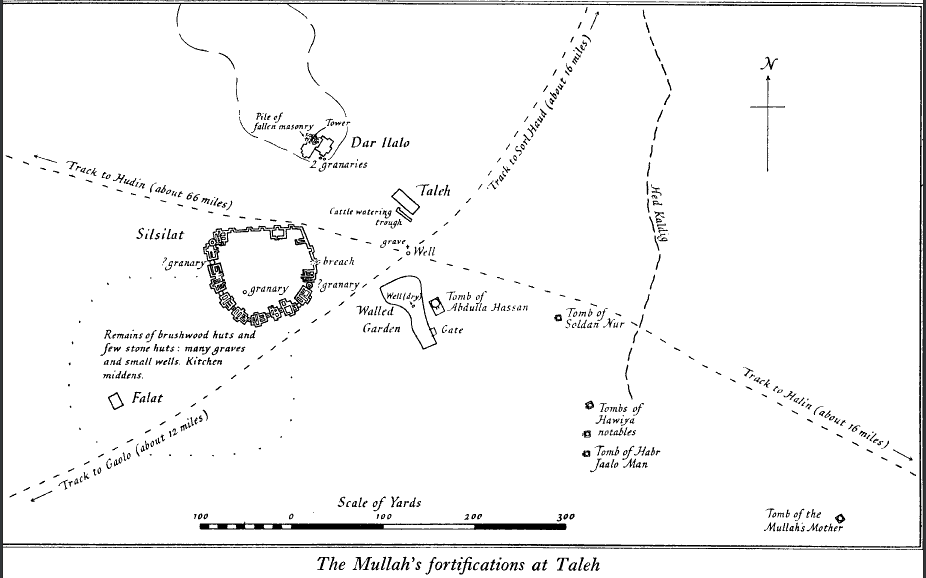
'The Dervisah fortifications at Taleh'. The tombs Sultan Nur, Mohamed Abdallah Hassan and unnamed Habr Je'lo and Hawiye notabales can be seen in the plan

The last intelligence report mention of Sultan Nur in the Italian archives was in 1907. After the death of Sultan Nur 1907/1908 in the Dervish camp at Taleh his son Dolal Nur ascended the sultanate in the dervish camp.

Sultan Nur was buried by his dervish in a large domed tomb in Taleh, his tomb predated the later dervish forts. His white tomb in the dervish capital is a testimony to his contribution to the movement. Few dervish founders are commemorated in Taleh, numbering only four.

William Archibald Macfadyen, a British geologist and the only scholar to study the structures of Taleh fort, mentioned the handful of tombs constructed by the dervish for their leaders and gave a detailed description of the tombs in 1931. In his article Macfayden only identified Sultan Nur's tomb by name out of the four dervish entombed in Taleh:

"South of the main cave-well is the considerable tomb of Abdullah Hasan senior, well plastered inside and out; it is now said to be empty. Adjoining this on the west is a walled garden with massive gateway and guard-house; the rest of the wall is not more than 5 feet high and plastered. There are still odd bushes and signs of cultivation to be seen, but the comparatively deep well in the middle is dry. To the east lies a row of four tombs. The most northerly is that of oneSoldan Nur of the Habr Yunis tribe; the next two, neither being plastered.and the first with the top left unfinished, are those of Hawiya notables whosenames my Somalis did not know. The most southerly tomb is that of aman of the Habr Jaalo tribe. The isolated tomb still farther east is that of'AbdullahHasan's mother. All the tombs are provided with narrow but very massive wooden doors, swinging about vertical extensions from top and baseof one side."

After the Bombing campaign of the Taleh fort and the Dervish retreat into Ethiopia, Tribal Chief Haji Mohamed Bullaleh (Haji the Hyena) of the Rer Ahmed Ainanshe, commanded a 3000 strong army that consisted of Habr Yunis, Habr Je'lo and Dhulbahante warriors and pursued the fleeing Dervishes. They attacked Muhammad Abdallah Hassan and his army in the Ogaden region and swiftly defeated them, causing Muhammad to flee to the town of Imi. Haji and his army looted 60,000 livestock and 700 rifles from the dervishes, which dealt a severe blow to them economically, a blow from which they did not recover.

Rulers

The Habr Yunis Sultanate had eight rulers throughout its duration and the institution of Sultan still lasts today with the Baha Deria leading I conflict still not being completely resolved. The Bah Makahil maintain a well respected pretender although the current Sultan Osman Ali Madar of the Baha Deria is considered as the Sultan of the Habr Yunis.

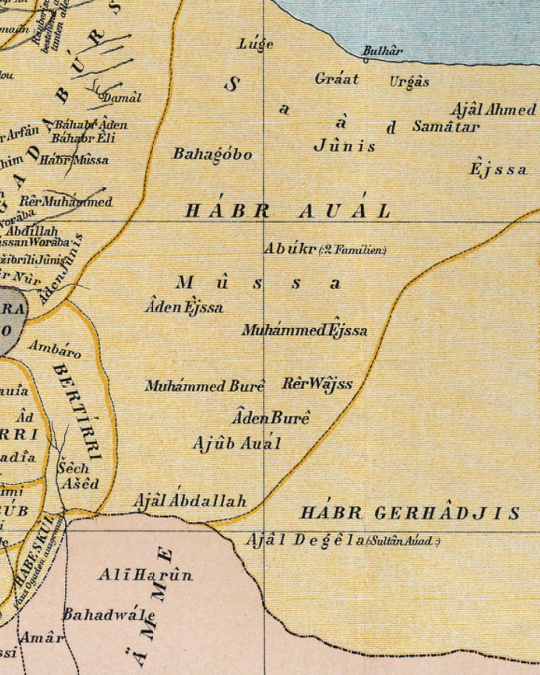
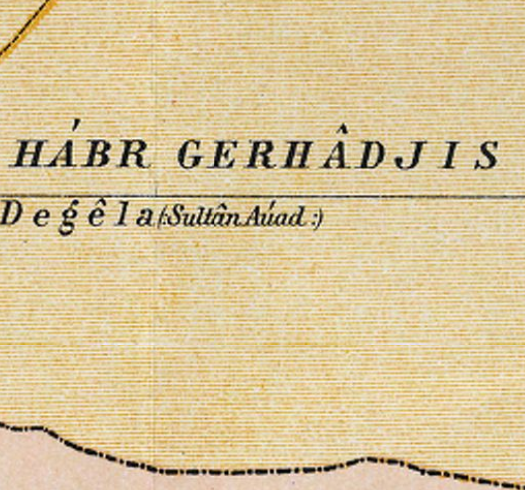
German map of the Horn showing Sultan Awad's domain, 1885

House of Ainanshe

Ainanshe Hersi; Caynaanshe Xirsi
Sugulle Ainanshe; Sugulle Caynaanshe r. 18th century–
Deria Sugulle; Diiriye Sugulle r. 1797–1854
Hersi Deria; Xirsi Diiriye	Awad Deria; Cawad Diiriye r. 1879–1892	Aman Deria; Amaan Diiriye
Madar Hersi; Madar Xirsi r. 1890–1938	Hersi Aman; Xirsi Amaan r. 1854–1879	Ahmed Aman; Axmed Amaan
Ali Madar; Cali Madar r. 1938–1979	Nur Ahmed; Nuur Axmed r. 1879–1907
Osman Ali; Cismaan Cali r. 1979–present	Dolal Nur; Doolaal Nuur r. 1910–1917

=== Anti-colonialism ===
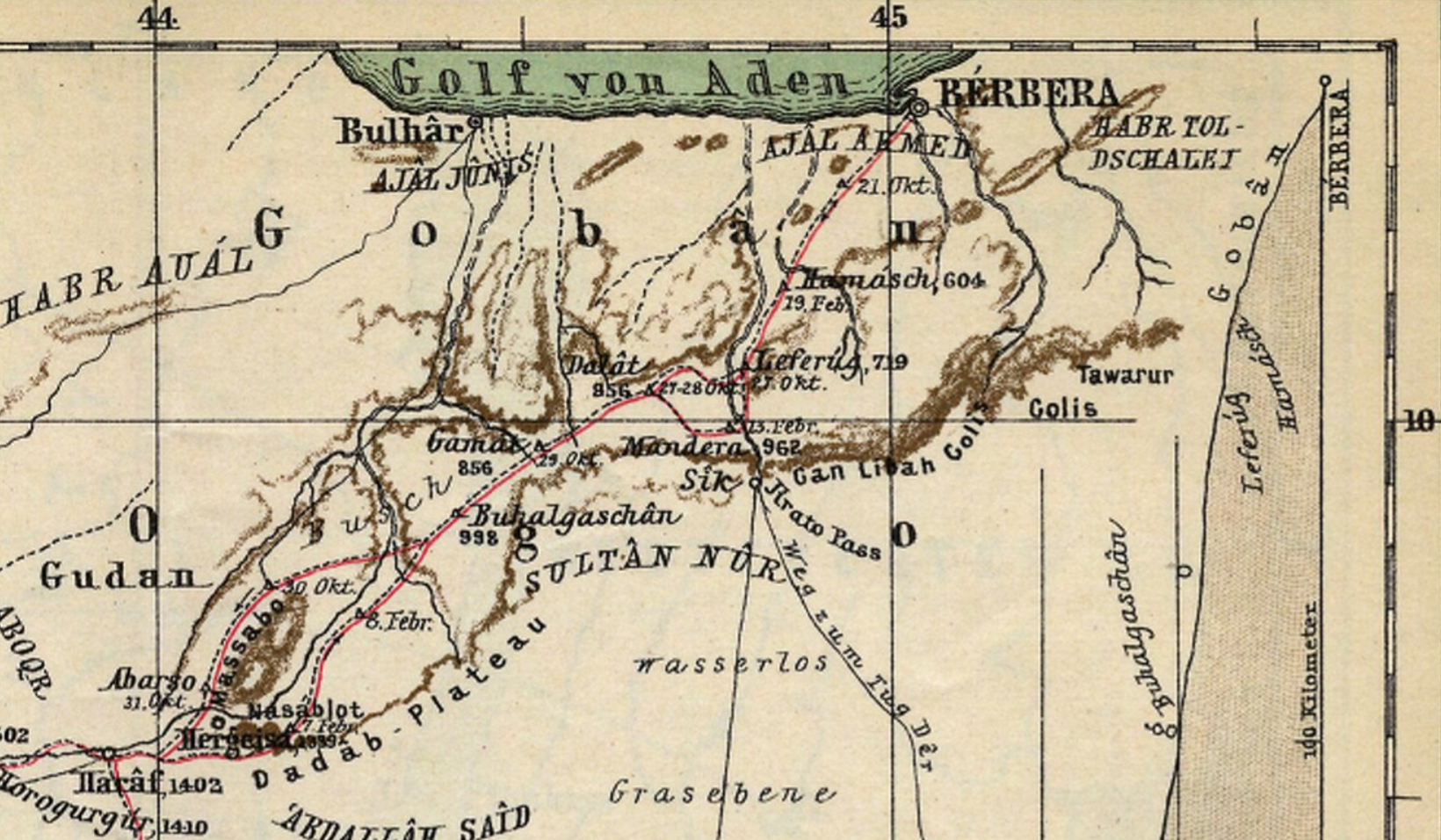
German map of the Horn from 1896 showing Sultan Nur's Domain in the Togdheer area

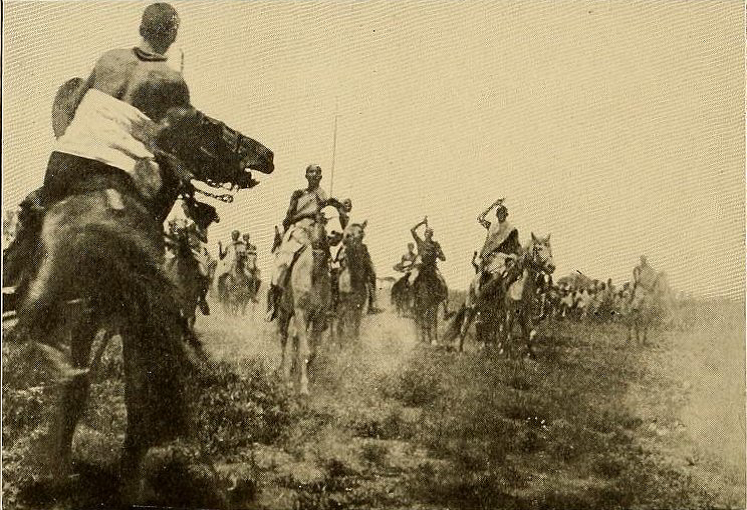
Sultan Nur's horsemen

The Rer Ainanshe along with their Hersi Osman kin were at the forefront of anti-colonial activity in the Somaliland protectorate and Italian Abyssinia. Lieutenant Mosye-Bartlette author of the Kings African rifles states that they constantly defied and resisted the British Protectrate government. In his 1884 publication La confrérie musulmane (Muslim Brotherhood) Henri Duveyrier states that the Rer Ainanshe had ties with the Senoussis, later Kings of Libya, who in the 19th century were involved in many anti-colonial upheavals across Muslim Africa. In 1896 Sultan Nur received a Senoussi delegation, at that time he was involved in war with the British government then based at Berbera.

Langton Walsh details an account of one of Nur's raids on the British in 1896, he states:

Ten days elapsed, but no reply to my letter came from Sultan Nur. I heard, however, that two Senousi Akwan were guests in his kraal; and this was a very significant fact, since it showed that these guests, members of a very influential community, were hatching a scheme to retaliate on and injure the Administration...With the aid of a telescope fixed on a swivel tripod we easily made out the raiders, but the scout could not even approximately tell us the number of horsemen we might have to contend with if we attacked them. He would not agree that they were mere Murrasseh bandits, but asserted that they were tribesmen led by two important chiefs. One chief was a Dulbanta with a large mounted force, and the other an infantry soldier magnate named Sultan Nur, who commanded in person possibly a few hundred horsemen of his own tribe and fifteen hundred footmen. The scout was certain that Sultan Nur was in command, since the sultan's horse, a whitish-grey, was well known to the Aysa Musa scout...Sultan Nur on this occasion had made a haul of about 1,500 camels, since there happened to be at Berbera three or four large caravans from the interior, in addition to the camels of the townsmen which had also been driven off. It transpired later that three raiders had been shot dead, and a few others were no doubt wounded by rifle fire. We also found four dead horses on the field. No doubt Sultan Nur had not been sufficiently punished

In 1899 Several members of the Rer Ainanshe would be among the founders of the Dervish movement, most prominent among being the Rer Amman brothers; Sultan Nur, Geele Ahmed and Hersi Ahmed.

Sections of the Hersi Osman once again clashed with the British in 1922 after a heavy tax was imposed upon them at Burao, the Rer Ainanshe and Said Hersi revolted in opposition to the tax and this caused them to clash with other sections of the Habr Yunis and the British colonial government. In the ensuing riot and shootout between the British and Hersi Osman, Captain Allan Gibb, a Dervish war veteran and district commissioner, was shot and killed. The British fearing they could not contain the revolt requested from Sir Winston Churchill, then-Secretary of State for the Colonies, to send troops from Aden and Airplane bombers in order to bomb Burao and livestock of the revolting clans to quell any further rebellion. The RAF planes arrived at Burao within two days and proceeded to Bomb the town with incendiaries, effectively burning the entire settlement to the ground.

Telegram from Sir Geoffrey Archer, Governor of British Somaliland to Sir Winston Churchill the Secretary of State for the Colonies:

I deeply regret to inform that during an affray at Burao yesterday between Rer Sugulleh and Akils of other tribes Captain Gibb was shot dead. Having called out Camel corps company to quell the disturbance, he went forward himself with his interperter, whereupon fire opened on him by some Rer segulleh riflemen and he was instantly killed. Miscreants then disappeared under the cover of darkness. In order to meet the situation created by the Murder of Gibb, we require two aeroplanes for about fourteen days. I have arranged with resident, Aden, for these. And made formal application, which please confirm. It is proposed they fly via Perim, confining sea crossing to 12 miles. We propose to inflict fine of 2,500 camels on implicated sections, who are practically isolated and demand surrender of man who killed Gibbs. He is known. Fine to be doubled in failure to comply with latter conditions and aeroplanes to be used to bomb stock on grazing grounds.

James Lawrence author of Imperial Rearguard: Wars of Empire writes

[Gibb]..was murdered by rioters during a protest against taxation at Burao. Governor Archer immediately called for aircraft which were at Burao within two days. The inhabitants of the native township were turned out of their houses, and the entire area was razed by a combination of bombing, machine-gun fire and burning.

After the RAF aircraft bombed Burao to the ground and months of unrest the Rer Ainanshe and other Hersi Osman clans agreed to pay a small fine for Gibbs death, but they refused to identify and apprehend the accused individuals. Most of the men responsible for Gibb's shooting evaded capture. In light of the failure to implement the taxation without provoking a violent response, the British abandoned the policy altogether.

=== Somali Republic and Somaliland ===
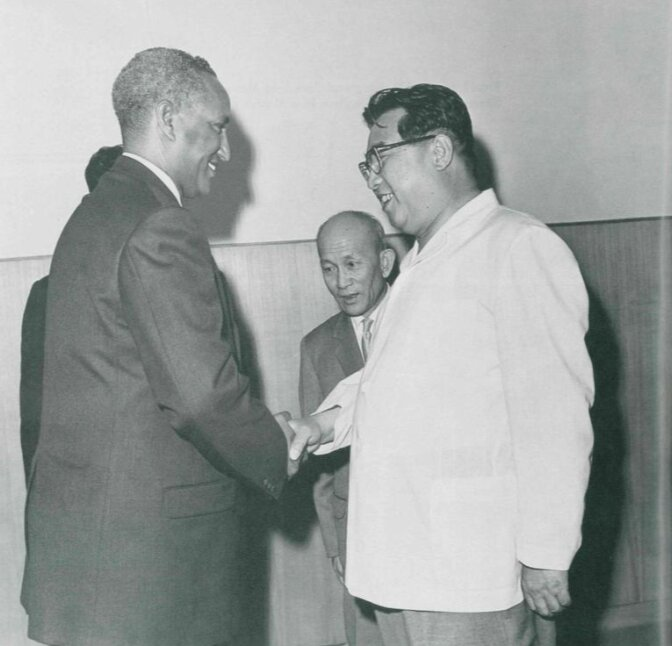
Vice-president Mohamed Ainanshe Guled in North Korea with General Secretary Kim Il Sung 1970

In 1956 the Rer Ainanshe founded a religious organisation that was fiercely opposed to what they saw as Christian imperialism by the British Somaliland government. Seeing that numerous secular political organisations with tribal orientations emerging Haji Yasin Handule of the Rer Wais Sugulle and other prominent Habr Yunis religious leaders founded the Party of Allah in 1956 with the intention of upholding Islam and dismantling tribalism. Yasin attempted to put a stop to inter-tribal conflicts by founding a group that would transcend tribal allegiances while maintaining an emphasis on Islam as the core of Somali identity. Haji Yasin influenced numerous other anti-colonial movements such as Nasser Allah.

Professor of African studies John Markakis in The 1963 rebellion in the Ogaden states :

The founders of Nasser Allah were allegedly inspired by the example of Hadj Yasin Handuleh, a religious leader of the Habr Yunis (Issaq) tribe in the Haud. The Habr Yunis are the vanguard of an Issaq drive into the Haud, and have been locked into a bloody conflict with the Ogaden tribes in that region which continues to this day. The Habr Yunis were often also at odds with fellow Issaq tribes, and such inter-necine conflict played into the hands of the alien rulers of the Somali. Seeking an end to it, Hadj Yasin sought to create an organization that transcended tribal loyalties, as the nationalist parties claimed to do, but still focused on Islam as the essence of Somali identity and unity. He called it Hizb Allah (Party of God). A group of young Ogaden students and traders who came to know Hadj Yasin were prompted to follow his example. In the late 1950s they formed an association they called Nasser Allah. The fact that they chose to establish a separate organization for the Ogaden indicates the imperative of maintaining tribal distinctions even at the level of nationalist mobilization

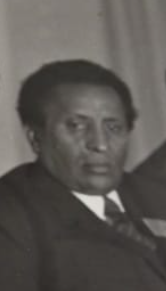
Hassan Adan Wadadid, founder of the Somali National Movement

Sheikh Ali Ismail Yacqub of the Rer Koshin Ainanshe was a prominent figure in the politics of the former Somaliland Protectorate, having been a member of the Somali National League. He was appointed as the newly created Somali Republic's Minister of Defence in 1960, the following year as President Gamal Abdel Nasser's state guest, he led a group to Egypt and spoke with him about military cooperation. He authorised cross-border attacks into Ethiopia in 1961, which resulted in the destruction of many facilities close to the border. Later, these clashes would intensify and result in the 1964 Ethiopian-Somali Border War.

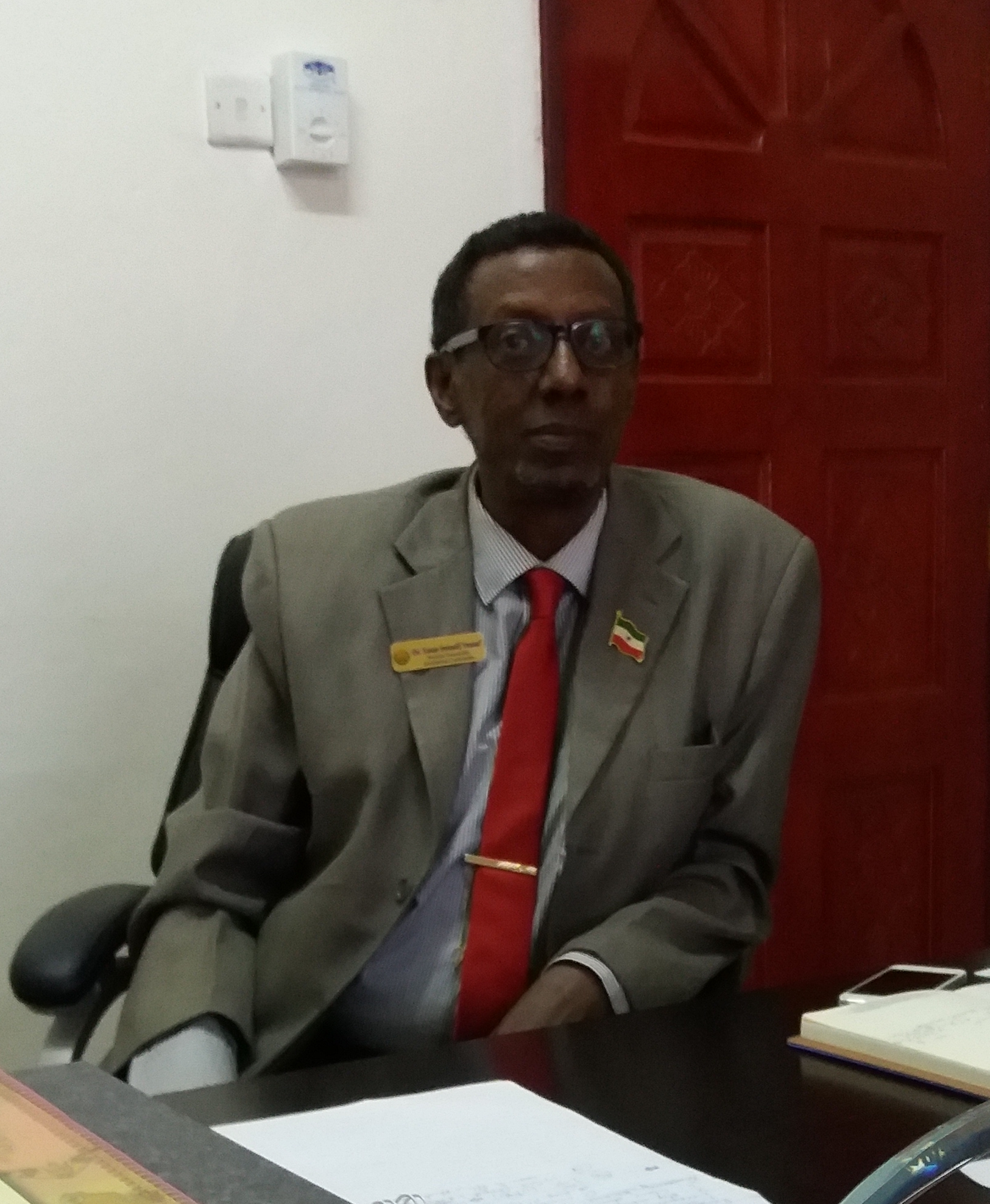
Dr Hassan Ismail Yusuf, former Somaliland minister of health

Among the notable Generals leading the Ethiopia-Somali border war was Mohamed Ainanshe Guled of the Rer Farah Ainanshe, as a young man he joined the Italian Carabinieri college and graduated in 1952. After the establishment of the SNA he was made head of the 26th division based in Woqooyi Galbeed. Mohamed is credited for the coining of most Somali Military terms and nomenclature which replaced the Italian and English systems. During his military career he rose to the rank of Brigadier general serving as the vice-commander and later Chief Of Staff of the Somali armed forces, the highest rank within the military. While serving as vice-president of the Somali Democratic Republic he Led a Somali delegation to the People's Republic of China on June 16, 1970, Ainanshe met Vice-Premier Li Xiannian and Chairman of the Chinese Communist Party Mao Zedong. The governments of the People's Republic of China and the Somali Democratic Republic signed a preliminary agreement for economic and technical cooperation on June 19, at the end of a diplomatic visit to Beijing.

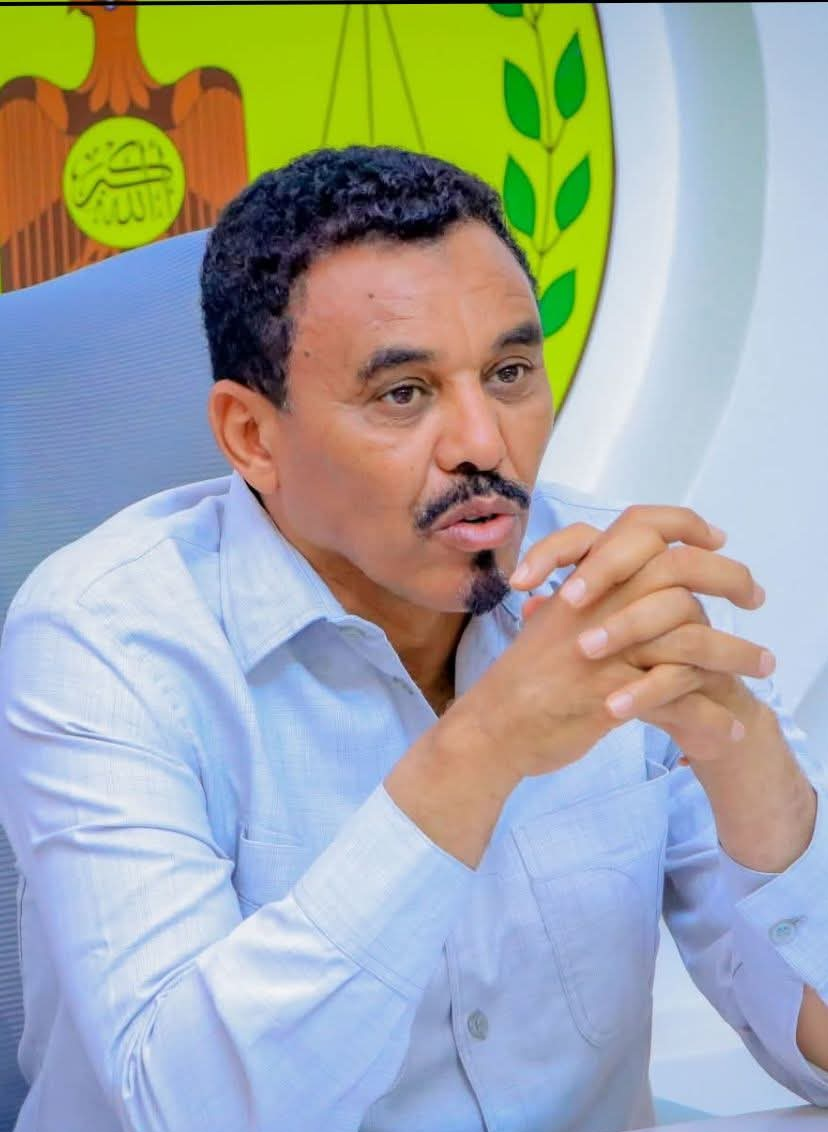
Muhumed Hassan Jama, Governor of Awdal region

Due to the increasing nepotism, clannism and corruption of the communist regime the SNM was organized in London, England, on April 6, 1981, by Hassan Adan Wadadid of the Farah Ainanshe, a former Somali diplomat and several other Isaaq intellectuals, he stated that the group's purpose was to overthrow the Siad Barre regime. Hassan was a double accredited ambassador to Somalia and Saudi Arabia and Pakistan in the 1960s. After the coup of 1969, he, like many diplomats and politicians in the country he moved to Riyadh, Saudi Arabia, where he and other prominent Isaaq diplomats, politicians, and intellectuals held secret meetings with the goal of overthrowing the Siad Barre government. This group became known as the Saudi Arabian Group and later corresponded with a London-based group with similar aims. In early January 1981, Hassan led a delegation to London from a Saudi Arabian group that included Abdisalam Yasin, Ahmed Ismail Abdi and Mohamed Hashi Elmi. After many meetings, the two groups merged to form the Somali National Movement. Hassan was the official representative for the newly formed group and on 6 April 1981 he announced the launch of the SNM which eventually successfully overthrew of the Barre government and the established the Republic of Somaliland which seceded from Somalia in 1991. A minority of Rer Ainanshe were opposed to secession instead advocating for a de-centralized Federal Union with Somalia, among them were Osman Jama Ali and Ridwan Hirsi Mohamed who both served as Prime Minister and deputy Prime Ministers of Somalia respectively. Rer Ainanshe have held multiple ministry positions in the Somaliland government since its inception, recent ministers include medical doctor Hassan Ismail Yusuf of the Rer Gutale Ainanshe heading the health ministry and Said Sulub Mohamed of the Mahamud Sugulle currently serving as the Minister of Livestock and Fisheries of Somaliland.

== Clan tree ==
- Ainanshe Hersi
  - Egal Ainanshe
  - Omar Ainanshe
  - Suban Ainanshe
  - Esa Ainanshe
  - Guled Ainanshe
  - Ahmed Ainanshe
  - Samaale Ainanshe
  - Hersi Ainanshe
  - Abdi Ainanshe
  - Farah Ainanshe
  - Butiye Ainanshe
  - Meigag Ainanshe
  - Wais Ainanshe
  - Koshin Ainanshe
  - Liban Ainanshe
  - Guutaale Ainanshe
    - Warsame Guutaale
    - Adan Guutaale
    - Yusuf Guutaale
    - Mohamed Guutaale
    - Abar Guutaale
    - Ghazali Guutaale
    - Midle Guutaale
    - Magan Guutaale
    - Abdille Guutaale
    - Elmi Guutaale
    - Fahiye Guutaale
    - Sugulle Guutaale
    - Hirsi Guutaale
    - Dualeh Gutaale
    - Ateye Guutaale
    - Said Guutaale
  - Sultan Sugulle Ainanshe
    - Gelle Sugulle
    - Farah Sugulle
    - Mahamoud Sugulle
    - Duale Sugulle
    - Mohamed Sugulle
    - Wais Sugulle
    - Roble Sugulle
    - Ahmed Sugulle (Father of Aqil Guled Haji)
    - Sultan Deria Sugulle
      - Adan Deria
      - Abdillahi Deria
      - Yusuf Deria
      - Ali Deria
      - Ismail Deria
      - Samatar Deria
      - Abokor Deria
      - Mahamud Deria
      - Egal Deria
      - Nur Deria
      - Guled Deria
      - Isman Deria
      - Ahmed Deria
      - Hassan Deria
      - Jama Deria
      - Sultan Awad Deria
      - Hersi Deria (Father of Sultan Madar)
      - Aman Deria (Father of Sultan Hersi and Grandfather of Sultan Nur)

== Notable people ==
- Abdillahi Diiriye Guled - literary scholar and discoverer of the Somali prosodic system
- Abdulkadir Said Ahmed - Footballer who plays as a midfielder for Finnish club VJS and the Somalia national team
- Ahmed Said Ahmed - international footballer who plays for VJS, as a defender and Captain of the Somalia national team
- Ali Ismail Yacqub - First Minister of Defence for the Somali Republic
- Awad Deria - 4th Sultan of the Habr Yunis clan
- Deria Sugulleh Ainashe- 2nd Sultan of the Habr Yunis clan
- Dolal Nur - 6th Sultan of the Habr Yunis clan
- Guled Haji - was a Somali wiseman, chief akil of Ba Eli section of the Rer Sugulle, and the commander of Habr Yunis sultanate.
- Hassan Adan Wadadid - Somali Republic ambassador to Saudi Arabia and Pakistan and one of the original founders and Vice Chairman of the Somali National Movement
- Hassan Ismail Yusuf - Somali politician and served as the Minister of Health of Somaliland
- Hersi Aman - 3rd Sultan of the Habr Yunis clan
- Madar Hersi - 5th Sultan of the Habr Yunis
- Mohamed Ainanshe Guled - Brigadier General of SNA and the vice president of the Somali Democratic Republic
- Mohamed Bullaleh - prominent 20th Century tribal chief and commander of the Hagoogane raid that destroyed Dervish movement
- Muhumed Hassan Jama - Politician currently serving as the Governor of Awdal region
- Nur Ahmed Aman - 4th sultan of the Habr Yunis and one of the founders of the Somali Dervish movement
- Osman Jama Ali - Prime Minister of Somalia under the Transitional National Government
- Ridwan Hirsi Mohamed - former Deputy Prime Minister of Somalia and Former Minister of Religious Affairs of Somalia.
- Said Sulub Mohamed - Somali politician, who is currently serving as the Minister of Livestock and Fisheries of Somaliland.
- Suldaan Said Ahmed - Finnish politician who is a member of the Parliament of Finland and the Helsinki City Council for the Left Alliance.
- Yasin Handule Wais religious scholar and founder of Somaliland's first Islamic party in the mid 20th century
