= Habr Yunis Sultanate =

Northern Somali kingdom around 1769 to 1907

Habr Yunis Sultanate Saldanadda Habar Yoonis (Somali) سلطنة هبر يونس (Arabic)
- c. 1769–1917
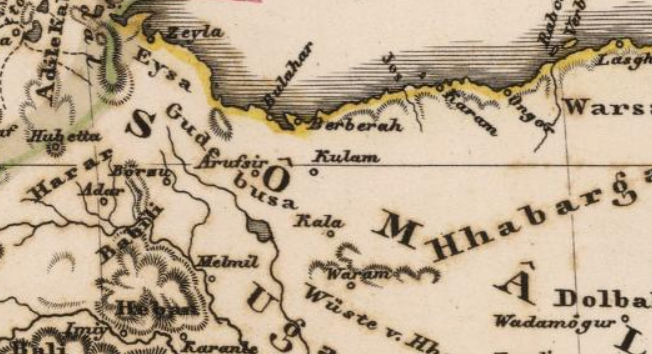
- Toyo, the first capital of the Habr Yunis
- Capital: Toyo (first); Burao (last)
- Common languages: Somali · Arabic
- Religion: Sunni Islam
- Government: Monarchy
- Suldaan
  - 1769–1797: Sugulleh Ainashe
  - 1879–1907 (last): Nur Ahmed Aman
  - 1910–1917 (last): Dolal Nur
- History
  - Established: c. 1769
  - Somaliland Campaign: 1889-1920
  - Disestablished: 1917
Preceded by	Succeeded by
Isaaq Sultanate	British Somaliland; Dervish Movement
- Today part of: Ethiopia; Somalia (de jure) ∟ Somaliland (de facto)

The Habr Yunis Sultanate (Somali: Saldanadda Habar Yoonis, Arabic: سلطنة هبر يونس) was a Somali kingdom that ruled parts of the Horn of Africa during the 18th century. It spanned the territories of the Habr Yunis clan which is part of the wider Isaaq in modern-day Somaliland and Ethiopia. The sultanate was governed by the Rer Ainanshe branch of the Habr Yunis clan.

== History ==
=== Establishment ===
The Habr Yunis Sultanate finds its roots in the Isaaq Sultanate which was established by the Rer Guled branch of the Eidagale after the Isaaq successfully defeated the Absame clan at Lafaruug in the 17th century. With time the Habr Yunis and later the Habr Awal and Habr Je'lo would break from the Isaaq Sultanate with the Habr Yunis forming their own Sultanate led by Sugulle the son of the previous Habr Yunis Chieftain, Ainanshe Hersi. The Sultan Deria Sugulleh would establish his capital at Wadhan (Waram) near the Sheikh pass and tax and administer the affairs of the Habr Yunis from the town.

=== Expansion and Rayyad War ===
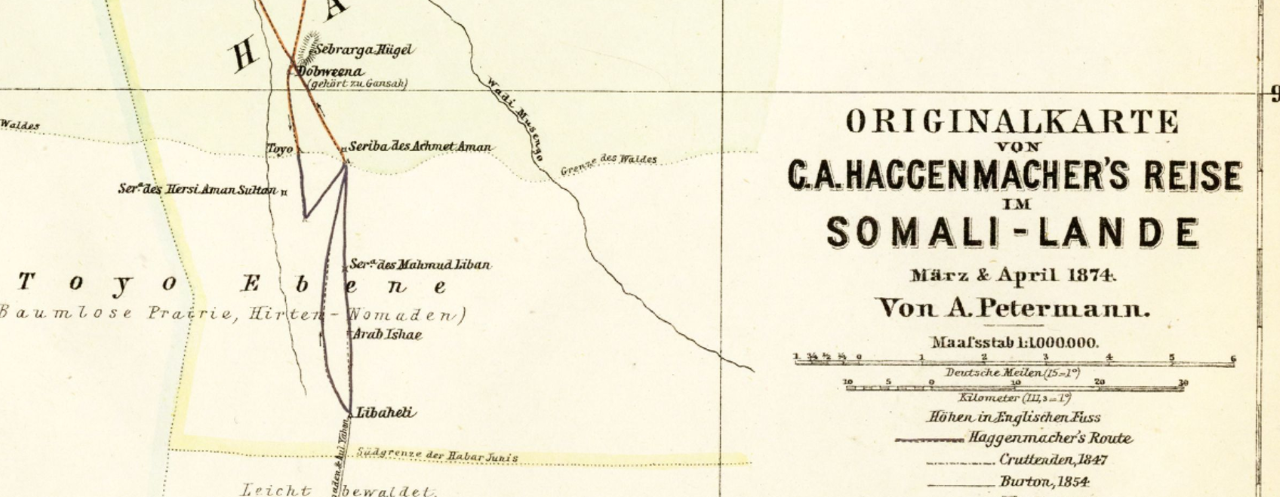
German Map from 1874 showcasing Sultan Hersi Aman's general location

Following Sultan Deria's death in the 1850s his grandson Hersi Aman would come to succeed him and usher in an era of conquest. Hersi Aman belonged to the Bah Makahil section of the Sugulle dynasty. In 1870 he would launch the Rayyad Wars against the Darood of Hawd and Dollo which would continue intermittently from 1870 to 1940 and give birth to a string of poems, the Guba poetic chain, one of the most well-known series in Somali history.

Swiss Explorer Haggenmacher met Hersi Aman in 1873 and also wrote of a successful Habr Yunis battle in the Hawd that occurred during his visit

The Habr Yunis had many wounded, but were also extremely rich in loot, the estimated number of loot was at least 10,000 camels.

At the battle of Haro Dhiig (Lake of Blood) in the Hawd, the victorious Habr Yunis had captured the Sultan of the Rer Haroun Ogaden with many lives lost on both sides. The captured Sultan sent a message to Hersi saying as a notable he should be spared. In response, Hersi replied with Laba Gob Kii Beer Jilicsan Baa Jaba meaning, amongst two counterparts the soft-hearted shall perish and the captive Sultan was subsequently executed.

=== First Civil War ===
Despite the great successes of Hersi Aman and new territory acquired, the other branches of the Rer Sugule grew wary of his increasing power as a ruler and stood to challenge him, fearing his unchecked leadership. The wise Guled Haji, another prominent member and elder of the Rer Sugule, had a fallout with Sultan Hersi, and his son was killed by one of Hersis' sons. Hersi's son approached his father and implored him to pay the traditional mag compensation to Guled for the loss of his child. Hersi arrogantly rebuffed his son and all-out conflict would break out between Ba Awal (Hersi's branch) and Baho Sugule branches of the Rer Sugule.

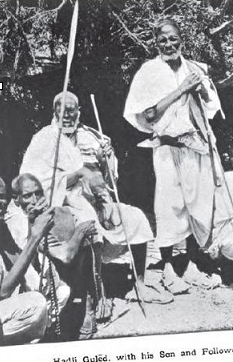
Haji Guled in 1906.

The Sultan Hersi himself would be killed in battle after some early clashes and later his commander Warsame would also fall. Warsame's sister lamented to her son Ali for the loss of Hersi, her husband Geid and other relatives in this poem recorded separately by both Phillip Paulitschke and Robecchi Brichetti.

Calow gaydha waxa iigu wacan geeridaan qabo'e
Caawaba gelin dhexaadkaan hadba gogosha taabtaaye
Gamas baa ku dhacay aabahaa goraygii dheeraaye
Gacmo jeedlaow Warsamaey gudurii siiyeene
Gaashaan-cade Muxumed bay giringirsheen meele
Maxamed Golaxley dhigeen geedkii Lebi-Cawle
Xirsigi madaxa ahaa waa gawraceen gacal ha waayaane

— Sister of Warsame's Lament
Translation:

O Ali, I lament the death of Geid my husband (your father)
I often wake up in the middle of the night and feel his bed
The good trick hit your father, who was as tall as a bouquet
Warsame's strong arms have disheveled vultures
Muhammad with the white shield rolled over like a wheel in the dust
They threw the slender Muhammad into the thicket where the Spitz antelopes live
They really did cut off Hersi's head (overthrew him); We have lost the leaders

Following Hersi's death, the Rer Sugule gathered and the issue of compensation for the Sultan's death was a pressing issue. The conflict originally starting because no compensation had been paid to Guled Haji for his son. They decided that none would be paid and they would try to put this conflict to rest.

Maxamed Bulxan's poem touches on the unique nature of the meeting

Beenowdey Habar Yoonistii bu'aha waallayde
Reer Sugulle gooddiga bankuu baarcaddii dhigaye
Iyana baarax uma soo shiraan beri samaagiiye

— Maxamed Bulxan Dal Dhammeeye
Translation:

The Habr Yunis who became false with their fighting talk
The Rer Sugule at the edge of the open place put down the young ones
They don't meet in an open place in good times

=== Dual Sultans Era ===
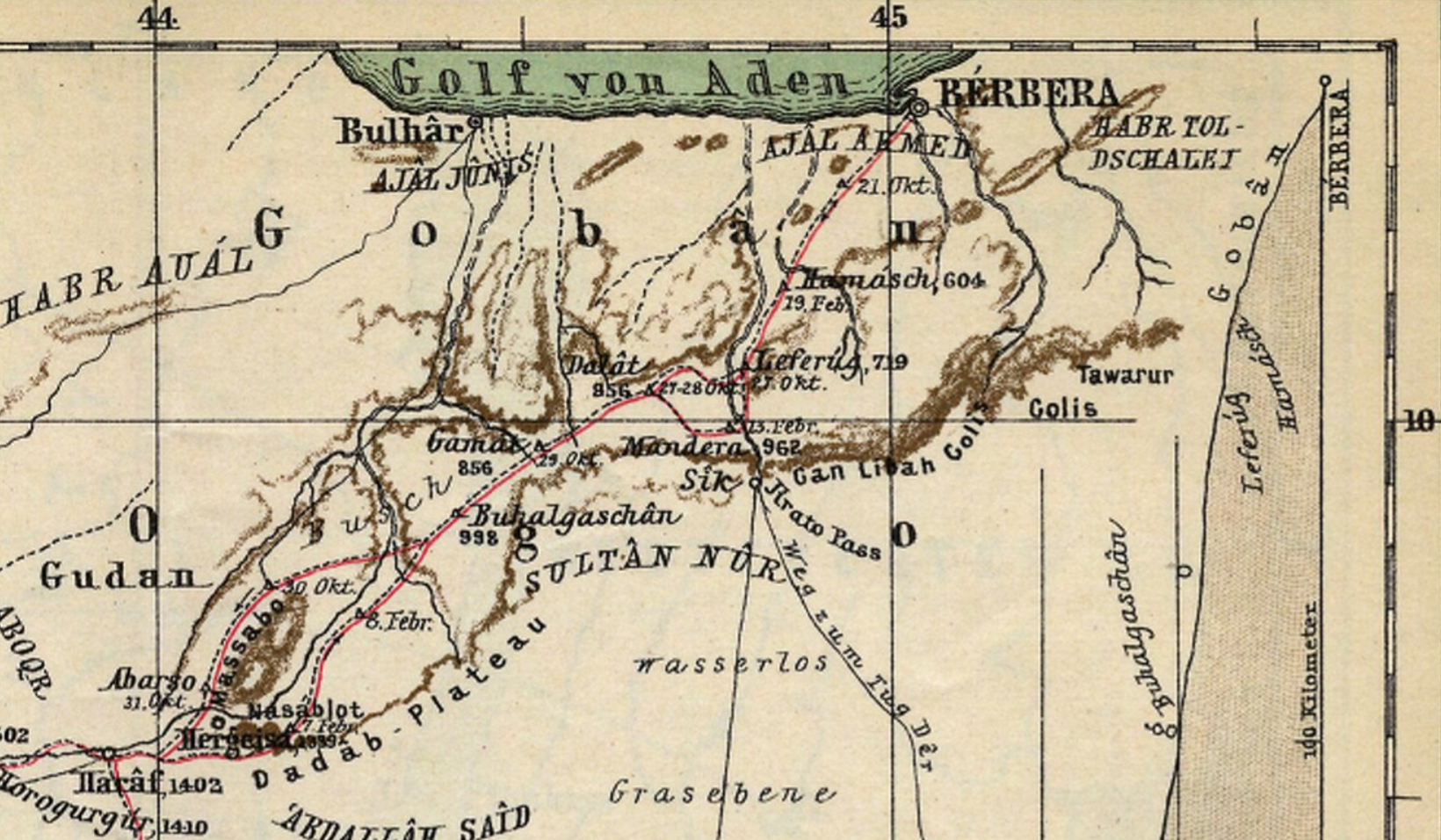
Sultan Nur's domains in Togdheer

After the death of Sultan Hersi Aman, the Baha Deria and Baha Makahil sections of the Sugulle dynasty vied for the Sultanship, which divided the Habr Yunis clan into two factions, the Baha Deria faction led by Guled Haji crowned Awad Deria a surviving son of the Sultan Deria Sugulleh. The Bah Makahil crowned Nur Ahmed Aman a young Mullah and nephew of Hersi Aman. Nur was initially uneasy and preferred his life as a Mullah rather than being the Sultan designate. The Habr Yunis were not interrupted by the British Somaliland protectorate which had been established in 1884 and was still largely relegated to the coast and its capital of Berbera. The two Sultans engaged in a lengthy war and divided the Sultanate's territory, where Awad ruled the Sultanate from his chosen capital of Burao and Nur from the Tuuyo plains and Oodweyne.

Frank Linsly James visited Sultan Awad at Burao in 1884 and witnessed the dissenting situation between the two Sultans. Describing the political situation in the region and frequent raids between the two rival Rer Sugulleh factions and their allied Habr Yunis subclans

It appeared the great Habr Gerhajis tribe was divided into two rival factions, the one owning allegiance to Sultan Owd, the other to his cousin, Sultan Noor. Between these two the country was about evenly divided, and the border-line was an everlasting scene of wars and rumours of wars, cattle raids, and attempted murders.

The Haber-Gerhajis tribe had formerly been under one Sultan and were very powerful, making frequent raids into Ogadayn, but on his death, two cousins, Awad and Nur, divided the country between them.

Awad was killed fighting in Ogaden by the Reer Ali. This allowed Nur to establish himself at Burao and rule over the entirety of the Habr Yunis. The Baha Deria still did not concede defeat and would eventually choose Awad's nephew, Madar Hersi, as their successor following Nur's death. Sultan Nur convened a shir of the Habr Yunis and decided to draw lots to settle the dispute with his challenger Madar Hersi rather than continue the senseless infighting that had lasted since Hersi Aman's death. Sultan Nur won the draw and gave Madar Hersi 100 camels as compensation and was proclaimed the uncontested Sultan of the Habr Yunis. The reunified rule under one Sultan Nur would last until the formation of the Dervish Movement several years later in 1899.

== Early Dervish Era ==
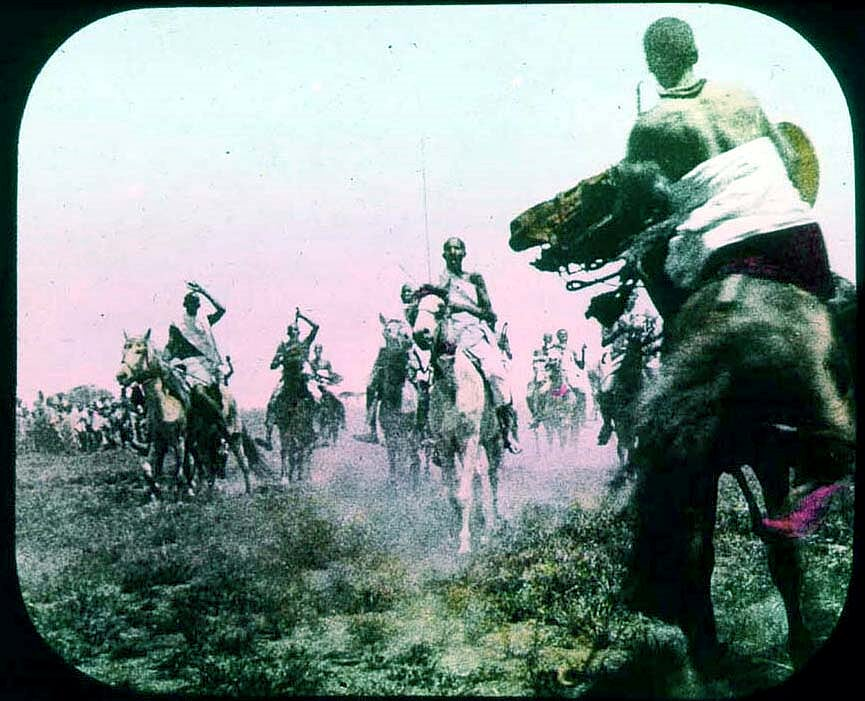
Sultan Nur & Habar Yunis horsemen 1896

Sultan Nur had been the architect of disturbances at Berbera and was the man who narrated the famous story of French Catholic missionaries in Berbera converting Somali children. According to the consul-general James Hayes Sadler this news was either spread or concocted by Sultan Nur of the Habr Yunis. Madar Hersi his former rival for the Sultan title had aided the Mullahs of Kob Fardod in recovering livestock that was previously looted by some of the Habr Yunis and this reignited after receiving aid from the Mullahs there notably Mohammed Abdullah Hassan. Upon his visit to Oodweyne in July 1899 Sultan Nur convened a great shir of the western Habr Yunis clans and called on them to join the new Dervish movement and upon their refusal he would leave to Burao and successfully rallied the eastern sections of the clan. The Dervish would declare war from Burao on September 1 of 1899. Madar was soon propagated as the legitimate Sultan by British authorities and managed the western sections of the clan throughout the period of the Dervish wars.

=== Incorporation into British Somaliland ===
Sultan Nur continued and would be heavily involved as a key figure of the Dervish movement and the main signatory of the Treaty of Illig in 1905 that granted them large tracts of today's Nugaal and the port of Eyl from the Italians to use. Following Sultan Nur's death in 1907 he was entombmed in Taleh the headquarters of the movement and his son Dolal Nur was crowned by the Dervish Habr Yunis clans while Sultan Madar Hersi the more established and powerful of the two eventually would become the uncontested Sultan as Dolal died prematurely in 1917 and left no heirs. With the widespread involvement of the British in the interior against the Dervish the once de facto independent interior clans were brought under British administration and the Habr Yunis Sultanate would end.

== Economy ==
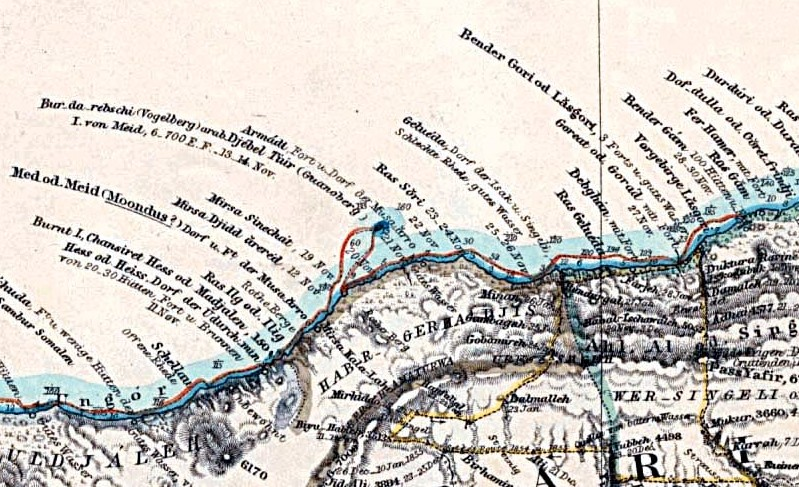
Map of the Daallo Mountain Ranges and coastal Sanaag showing the Musa Arreh (Habar Yunis) settled in Maydh in the year 1860

The Habr Yunis Sultanate had strong economy and controlled two routes to the major port of Berbera leading from the Jerato and Sheikh mountain passes into the Hawd and Ogaden country. The key city of Burao was the Trade was significant and bolstered during the period that a Habr Yunis man Sharmarke Ali Saleh had established himself as Emir of Berbera and Zeila. The eastern sections of the Habr Yunis had coastal access and several ports of their own. They attained a lot of frankincense in the mountains south of Maydh and Harshaw. Arab and Banyan merchants would visit Maydh for commerce before continuing on to the larger ports such as Berbera and Zeila. Maydh was the preeminent export point for large hides the town had dialogue with Berbera with a large amount of cross trade occurring usually by dhow. As well alongside other northern Somalis and Isaaqs in particular, the Habr Yunis were significant traders in Yemen with Frederick Hunter giving an 1877 account of their trade.

Somalis of the Habr Gerhajis tribe arrive from Ogadain with feathers, myrrh, gum, sheep, cattle, and ghee, carrying away in exchange piece goods; they also make four trips in the season; they remain for less than a month, and during their stay reside with fellow-tribesmen, taking their meals in the mokhbâzah or eating-house.

== Administration ==
Sultans of the Habr Yunis exercised power both indirectly and directly through allied Akils and leaders of the various subclans of the wider clan and by leading the Habr Yunis in battle against rivals. The seat of Habr Yunis Sultans was deliberately chosen in Wadhan and later Burao along the caravan route in order to have a firm grip on trade and also ensure a steady stream of taxes from passing traders. New information would be passed along these trade routes and the Sultans would be well informed of occurrences as the Somalis have a penchant for being informed about things. Explorer Richard Burton in his 1854 journey to Harar heard from local Somalis who told him the latest reports from the ongoing Crimean War. The capitals of Wadhan and Burao served as important watering places for both merchants and nomads alike and access to them was crucial for orderly trade from the Hawd and Ogaden regions to Berbera. According to the current Sultan Osman Ali, the oldest son of a Sultan is the rightful heir, but if he does not fill the requirements another son can be selected. A Sultan has to be religious, an eloquent speaker, courageous, and has to be fertile. A guurti of 40 leading elders from the Habr Yunis subclans would come to make this decision on the successor. Sultans would receive a yearly tribute or saado of livestock imposed on the rest of the Habr Yunis. Sultan Osman Ali states that the Sultan distributed the livestock amongst the Habr Yunis to the less fortunate and needy as a form of welfare.

== Rulers ==
The Habr Yunis Sultanate had eight rulers throughout its duration and the institution of Sultan still lasts today with the Baha Deria leading I conflict still not being completely resolved. The Bah Makahil maintain a well respected pretender although the current Sultan Osman Ali Madar of the Baha Deria is considered as the Sultan of the Habr Yunis.

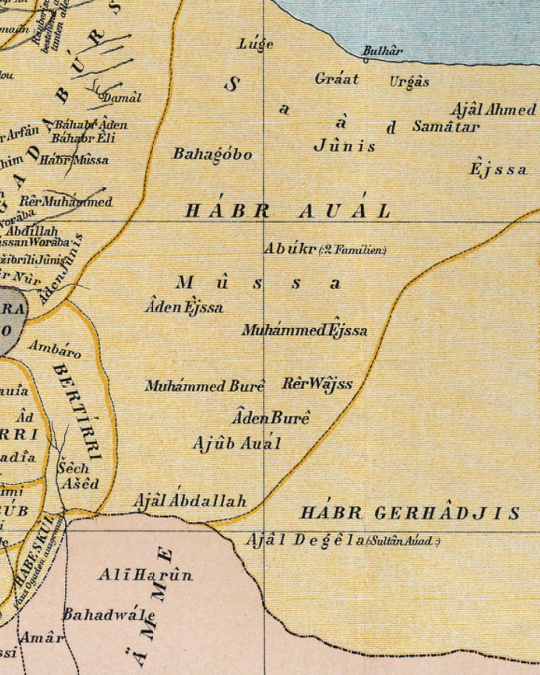
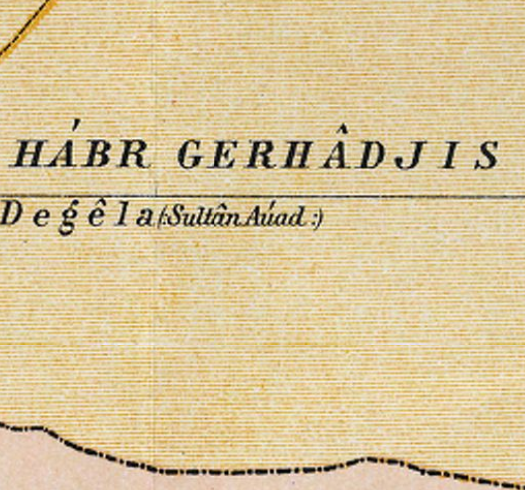
German map of the Horn showing Sultan Awad's domain, 1885

	Name	Reign From	Reign Till
1	Ainasha Hersi (traditional chief)		
2	Sultan Sugulleh Ainasha (first sultan)		
3	Sultan Diriyeh Sultan Sugulleh Ainasha		
4	Sultan Hersi Aman Sultan Diriyeh		
5	Sultan Nur Ahmed Aman Sultan Diriyeh		
6	Sultan Awad Sultan Diiriye		
7	Sultan Dolal Sultan Nur		
8	Sultan Madar Hersi Sultan Diiriye		

=== Family tree ===
House of Ainanshe

Ainanshe Hersi; Caynaanshe Xirsi
Sugulle Ainanshe; Sugulle Caynaanshe r. 18th century–
Deria Sugulle; Diiriye Sugulle r. 1797–1854
Hersi Deria; Xirsi Diiriye	Awad Deria; Cawad Diiriye r. 1879–1892	Aman Deria; Amaan Diiriye
Madar Hersi; Madar Xirsi r. 1890–1938	Hersi Aman; Xirsi Amaan r. 1854–1879	Ahmed Aman; Axmed Amaan
Ali Madar; Cali Madar r. 1938–1979	Nur Ahmed; Nuur Axmed r. 1879–1907
Osman Ali; Cismaan Cali r. 1979–present	Dolal Nur; Doolaal Nuur r. 1910–1917

== Legacy ==
Amongst the Habr Yunis the traditional institution and leadership of the clan survived the British Somaliland period into present times. The Rer Ainashe Sultans although no longer ruling vast territory and with separate Habr Yunis subclans having their own Sultans still remain status the recognized leaders of the Habr Yunis. The current Sultan is Osman Ali Madar who is active in social issues in modern-day Somaliland.
