= Guled Haji =

Somali sage

Guled Haji Guleed Axmed Sugule
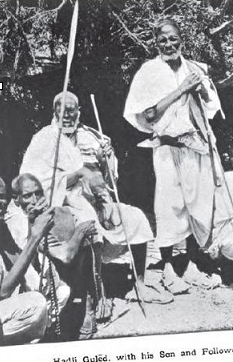
- Guled Haji (center) in 1906
- Born: Guled Ahmed Sugule; 1820s
- Died: 1907
- Occupation: Aqil

Guled Haji (Somali: Guuleed Axmed Sugulle; 1820s–1907) was a Somali sage and the Aqil or leader of the Baha Sugule branch of the powerful Rer Ainanshe Habr Yunis. The Rer Ainashe are the traditional rulers of the Habr Yunis Sultanate.

== Biography ==
Guled had completed the Hajj pilgrimage to Makkah and adopted the honorific Hajji title and was referred to as such rather than his full name. He was a grandson of the first Sultan of the Habr Yunis Sugulleh Ainashe. According to Italian explorer Enrico Baudi i Vesme, who visited Burao in 1889, Guled Haji was a prominent chief of Burao ranking second only to Sultan Awad Deria. Guled Haji has a town named after him in the Oodweyne district of Togdheer.

=== Proverbs ===
Guled was known for his wise speech and proverbs and he gave birth to hundreds of them in the Somali language and some are still used in the present day.

Ceel biyo lihi ma foga

Translation:

A well which has water is never far

Hadaan idin sheego imikaad so dilisaan

Translation:

If I tell you you'll conflict will erupt

The Habr Je'lo had asked Guled which man among them was the wisest but he responded with this remark "if i divulge his name, you would instantly kill him" by pronouncing him the wiset Guuleed a famous sage words would sentence such a man to death making him a target for revenge. Somali nomads usually seek the best of men for their revenge killings. Guled was keen to preserve harmony and as a powerful individual he was aware his words carried weight.

=== War with Hersi Aman ===
Sultan Hersi Aman's increasing grip and autocratic rule over the Habr Yunis had fermented some resentment amongst his direct subclan (Rer Sugule) and some stood to challenge him. Guled had a fallout with Sultan Hersi and his son was killed by one of Hersis' sons in battle. Hersi's son approached his father and implored him to pay the traditional mag compensation to Guled for the loss of his child. Hersi arrogantly rebuffed his son and all-out conflict would break out between Ba Awal (Hersi's branch) and Baho Sugule branches of the Rer Sugule.

Fighting would continue and one Baha Sugulle leading warrior Warsame Dhakaar had slain 3 brothers of Ba Awal. Pressured to spare the 4th teenager brother Jama Ammume (Jama Warsame "Dhinbiil" Yusuf sultan Diiriye) also known as " Ammume (the Mute)" a great-grandson of Sultan Deria Sugule who was from a different house "Bah" (wife of sultan Deria). Warsame reluctantly pressured by his men urging him not to make the mother virtually childless at her age, he relented adding a contemptuous remark "Having killed all her worthy sons let her use this one begging for offals."These words have deeply injured the Mute, so much that he couldn't hide it and had to admit it in his poem after killing Warsame "now that i have quenched my thirst healing my festering wound from his injurious mouth", during the next clash Jama would mortally wound Warsame and recited his first ever poem. In it, he praises his horse 'Hamar' that performed well that day and speaks about Warsame. These poems were recorded by Luigi Robecchi Bricchetti in his 1889 article.

Col aloosan Xamarow haddii xalay la ugaanshay
Heensaha hadddaan kugu itibay goor aleyl dhexe ah
Indhaalaha haddaan kuu xidh-xidhay suuman la adkeeyay
Isha bari hadii loo kiciyo awrtii reer Sugule
Kuwii lays aqoon jiray haddii lagu ogaan duulay
Abaanduule Guuleed [Guled Haji] hadii ubaxa loo gooyay
Waa boqor agtiisa'e hadday "alelegtii" yeedh'dhay
Usha Daba-xidh ooddiyo haddii laysu wada giijay
Eebada haddii laysku riday ilig-jartii hooto
Abdikayba intii hore hadaan dabo adeegaayay
Kolku ina qolyaeedkii sidii aarka nagu qayshay
Anigoo aqoon jirin haddii lay ogeysiiyay
Onkad baxay la moodyow kolkan amarka qaadsiiyay
Doc aroorka uguma tago orodka siibshaaye
Oogada hadduu igala maray agabarkuu joogay
Anna Awlaxaan siday haddaan oofta midig gooyay
Kol haddaan Warsame aayiroon Baho agoomeeyay
Kol haddaan Ugaaskii ka dilay u ololiyeynaayay
Kol hadaan ka oon baxay afku aramigu jiifay
Alxamdu lilaa Eebaw haddaan umalkii qaar reebay

==== Death of Hersi Aman ====
The Sultan Hersi himself was killed in previous battles making his clan belligerent pushing the war even though in all purpose have been defeated. At last offered an honorable offer they accepted the terms when Warsame having killed 3 brothers of their clan, hearing of the amount of the restitutions in livestocks in the hundreds collected from everyman including Warsame, Warsame scornfully replied "let the herds of the coward be collected for such compensations, am not" that and killing the 3 brothers ignited the war again killin the compromise deal. A widow lamenting the loss of her husband Gaydh, and her brother Mohammed Golaxle (the funnel chested) Pectus excavatum including Sultan Xirsi, she urged her son Ali to avenege his father and others and she scathingly emasculated others for living under the hemp of women's skirt other relatives in this poem.

Calow gaydha waxa iigu wacan geeridaan qabo'e
Caawaba gelin dhexaadkaan hadba gogosha taabtaaye
Gamas baa ku dhacay aabahaa goraygii dheeraaye
Gacmo jeedlaow Warsamaey gudurii siiyeene
Gaashaan-cade Muxumed bay giringirsheen meele
Mohammed Golaxley dhigeen geedkii Lebi-Cawle
Xirsigi madaxa ahaa waa gawraceen gacal ha waayaane

One of the sons of the Sultan recited these lines in a reply to Warsame's line.

Jidhkii ina Amaan iyo la waa jalanqayaashiiye
Jirid nimaan lahayn baa baqee taydu ii jarane
Hadii nabada jeelkeeda la helo waa anoon jirine
Jillow baan ahay haddi aabahay joogi lagu raadin

==== Continuation of the War ====
Following Hersi's death the Rer Sugule gathered and the issue of compensation for the Sultan's death was a pressing issue. The conflict originally starting because no compensation had been paid to Guled Haji for his son. They decided that none would be paid for Xirsi the instigator or his son but the rest were compensated (the numbers of killings surpassing the other party) difference in death.

Maxamed Bulxan's poem touches on the unique nature of the meeting

Waa beeyo Habar Yoonistii bu’aha waallayde
Reer Sugulle gooddiga bankuu baalcaddii dhigaye
Iyana baarax uma soo shiraan beri samaadkiiye

— Maxamed Bulxan Dal Dhammeeye
Translation:

with crazed daring the Habr Yunis were once famed, no more barvado now soft as a reisen.
Non of Sugule clansmen remains ( nothing left of once the men who welded those swords) but their short-swords abandoned on the plains.
Merry they never gather or assemble happily like their old days

Despite this 2 year conflict culminating in Hersi's death it would not entirely end. Both Awad Deria and Nur Ahmed Aman were proclaimed Sultan by their respective branches (Baho Sugule and Ba Awal respectively) with Sultan Nur eventually triumphing as the uncontested Sultan. Guled was a strong supporter of Sultan Awad and during the period of division, the rival sultans would split Habr Yunis territory in two and the lucrative caravan routes to tax. Sultan Nur held the Jerato pass and Tuuyo plains and his rival Sultan Awad Deria secured Burao as his base until his death, with Sultan Nur ultimately taking control of it.

== See also ==
- Hersi Aman
- Awad Deria
- Burao
- Garhajis
