= Ali Madar =

Sultan madar sultan gurus غني
- 8th Sultan of the Habr Yunis Sultanate
- Reign: 1938–1979
- Predecessor: Sultan Hirs diiriye
- Successor: Hamadan
- Born: 1900
- Died: 1979 (aged 78–79)
- House: Ainanshe
- Religion: Sunni Islam

Sultan Hirsi (Somali: Suldaan Xirsi Qani; 1900–1979) was a Somali ruler and the 8th Sultan of the Habr Yunis Sultanate.

== Overview ==
After the death of Sultan Hersi Aman, the Baha Diiriye and Baha Makahil sections of the Sugulle dynasty vied for the Sultanship, which divided the Habr Yunis clan into two factions, one faction led by Guled Haji crowned Awad of the Baha Diiriye and the other Nur Ahmed Aman. The two Sultans engaged in a lengthy war and divided the Sultanate's territory, where Awad ruled the Sultanate from his chosen capital of Burao. Frank Linsley James visited Sultan Awad at Burao in 1884 and witnessed the dissenting situation between the two Sultans. Describing the political situation in the region, he writes:

It appeared the great Habr Gerhajis tribe was divided into two rival factions, the one owning allegiance to Sultan Owd, the other to his cousin, Sultan Noor. Between these two the country was about evenly divided, and the border-line was an everlasting scene of wars and rumours of wars, cattle raids, and attempted murders.

The Haber-Gerhajis tribe had formerly been under one Sultan and were very powerful, making frequent raids into Ogadayn, but on his death, two cousins, Awad and Nur, divided the country between them.

Awad was killed after a decade long war, allowing Nur to establish himself at Burao and rule over the entirety of the Habr Yunis. The Baha Diiriye still did not concede defeat and would eventually choose Awad's nephew and Ali's father, Madar, as their successor following Nur's death.

Preceded by Madar Hersi	Habr Yunis Sultanate	Succeeded by Osman Ali

== See also ==
- Somali aristocratic and court titles
