= Madar Hersi =

Sultan Madar Hersi سلطان مَدَرْ حِرْسِيْ
- 7th Sultan of the Habr Yunis Sultanate
- Reign: 1890–1938
- Predecessor: Awad Deria
- Successor: Ali Madar
- Born: 1876
- Died: 1938 (aged 61–62)
- House: Ainanshe
- Religion: Sunni Islam

Sultan Madar Hersi Deria (Somali: Madar Xirsi Diiriye; 1876–1938) was a Somali ruler and the 7th Sultan of the Habr Yunis Sultanate.

== Overview ==
Madar was a son of Hersi Deria (not to be confused with Hersi Aman) and grandson of Sultan Deria Sugulleh Ainashe and thus belonged to the Baha Deria section of the Rer Sugulle. H.G Haggenmacher met Madar's father in 1873 and described him as the chief of the Habr Yunis and witnessed him leading an expedition against a neighbouring tribe.

Haggenmacher briefly describing the battle, writes:

In the meantime, the battle between the two Gabilas had reached an unbelievable extent. The news of the approaching forces spread like wildfire to the scattered settlements of the enemy, who, instead of fighting back, placed their armies at secure places and then attacked the powerful opponents with a united force; But Hersi Sultan had taken care to prevent any late attack by occupying the few wells and watering places of the enemy with strong detachments of troops, forcing them to offer peace to the victor and to provide hostages for safety

== Civil War ==
Before Madar's ascension to the throne the Bah Makahil and Baha Deria were engaged in a lengthy war over the sultanate. Sultan Nur Ahmed Aman and Sultan Awad Deria, each claiming to be the rightful ruler, led opposing factions of the Habr Yunis. Awad would later die in a raid in 1890 and the Baha Deria chose Madar as his successor. His coronation led to new tensions as the Bah Makahil still claimed Nur as the rightful ruler. According to Drake Brockman, the Habr Yunis decided to end the dispute with a throwing of lots and whoever won would be Sultan of the Habr Yunis, Nur won and was declared Sultan. But Madar and his followers would not recognize Nur, and so Madar established himself at Burao. According to Percy V. Alymer, who visited Burao in 1898, Madar was the ruling Sultan of the district. In early 1899 the Tariqa at Kob Fardod, which Mohammed Abfallah Hassan was head of, was raided and had their camels looted, Madar apprehended the raiders and returned the stolen Camels to the Mullah and the Tariqa, pledging allegiance to Madar and espousing his cause. This was during a time that Nur and the Tariqa had fallen out as a result of Nur raiding the Habr Je'lo. Madar would eventually cut ties with the Tariqa and ally himself with the Qadiriya. After Nur began the Dervish rebellion, a faction of the Bah Makahil would crown the son of Hersi Aman, Jama as Sultan. However, Jama's reign was short-lived, leaving Madar unchallenged. In 1936 clan chief Ali Yusuf Kenadid sent a letter to Madar desperately seeking an alliance with him but was rebuffed. Madar's son Ali would later become Sultan, and his grandson Osman is currently one of the main Habr Yunis Sultans. Osman was fundamental to the peace process of the 90s that put an end to the Somaliland civil war.

Preceded by Dolal Nur	Habr Yunis Sultanate	Succeeded by Ali Madar
