= Dolal Nur =

Sultan Dolal Nur سلطان دُولال نور
- 6th Sultan of the Habr Yunis Sultanate
- Reign: 1910-1917
- Predecessor: Nur Ahmed Aman
- Successor: Madar Hersi
- Born: 1856
- Died: 1917 (aged 60–61)
- House: Ainanshe
- Religion: Sunni Islam

Sultan Dolal Nur (Somali: Doolaal Nuur; 1856–1917) was a Somali ruler and the 6th sultan of the Habr Yunis Sultanate during the late nineteenth century.

== Overview ==
Dolal was crowned by the elders of the Habr Yunis after his father Nur Ahmed Aman died in the Dervish camp. His grand-uncle Sultan Hersi's death caused a decade-long civil war when his father Nur was crowned Sultan and his great uncle Awad Sultan Deriyeh and eldest living son of sultan Deriyeh declared himself a rival sultan in 1881. The two Sultans were now at war with each other and divided the Kingdoms territory between themselves, with Nur being based in the Toyo plains and Awd establishing himself at Burao.

In the 1890s Sultan Awad Deria was killed in a battle which resulted in Sultan Nur facing no opposition and was the sole ruler of the Habr Yunis Sultanate up until he started the Dervish uprising, which resulted in his uncle Madar Hersi being crowned. The Habr Yunis were now divided into two factions: pro-Dervish and anti-Dervish, the former being ruled by Sultan Nur and the latter the newly crowned Sultan Madar.

With the Dervish defeat none of Dolal's heirs succeeded him leaving Madar's descendants as the undisputed Sultans of the Habr Yunis.

Preceded by Nur Ahmed Aman	Habr Yunis Sultanate	Succeeded by Madar Hersi

== See also ==
- Somali aristocratic and court titles
