= Deria Sugulle Ainanshe =

Sultan Diria Sugulleh Ainashe سلطان ديريا سو غوله عيناشا
- 2nd Sultan of the Habr Yunis Sultanate
- Reign: 1797-1854
- Coronation: 1836
- Predecessor: Deria Sugulleh Ainashe
- Successor: Hersi Aman
- Born: 1825
- Died: 1879 (aged 53–54); Lebi Cawl
- House: Ainanshe
- Religion: Sunni Islam

Diria Sugulle Ainanshe (Somali: Diiriye Sugulle Caynaashe; 1825–1879) was a Somali ruler and the 2nd Sultan of the Habr Yunis Sultanate, reigning from the late-eighteenth to the mid-nineteenth century.

== Biography ==
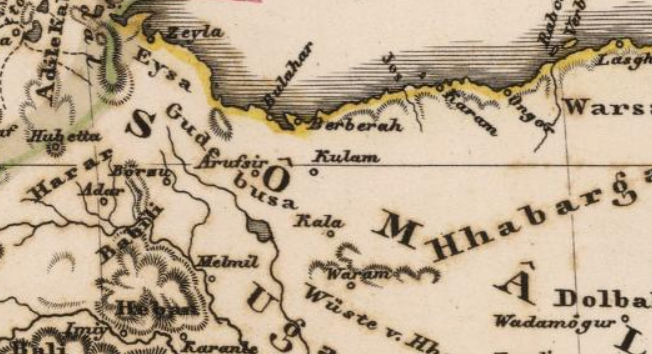
Map of key settlements with Diria's capital Waram visible

Diria was the second Sultan of the Habr Yunis who came from a lineage of tribal chiefs. His father, Sugulle, was first Sultan of the Habr Yunis and his Grandfather, Ainanshe, was the tribe's Chieftain. The earliest recorded mention of Diria is from 1840 by French Explorer Antoine Thomson d'Abbadie. The Sultan had his capital at Waram or 'Wadhan' in Togdheer just northwest of Burao and its important wells. Caravans would pass Waram en route to Berbera through the Sheikh pass and Diria would collect tax and administer affairs of the Habr Yunis from the town.

Lieutenant C.P Rigby in the year 1841 writes:

The Hubr Gajis tribe and its different branches are governed by two Sultans, named Sultan Diria [Habr Yunis Sultan] and Sultan Farah [Eidagale Sultan]: the residence of the latter is at Toro.

Enrico Baudi i Vesme who visited Burao in 1898 writes:

The chief of the Habr Junis lineage, named Hainasce [Ainashe], had seventeen children, one of whom his name was Soghulli [Sugulleh]. First they stayed together, then they separated, forming one Rer Soghulli, who are the most numerous, the other sixteen children together, the Baha Hainasce.

Drake Brockman in his book British Somaliland published in 1912 writes:

Diriyeh, the head of the Rer Segulleh, was universally proclaimed Sultan by the rest of the Habr Yunis tribe...Sultan Diriyeh lived to a great age, and had no less than eighteen sons, of whom the first two were borne to him by a woman of the Makahil section of the Habr Awal tribe, and the elder of these, Aman by name, joining with his brother, formed the Ba Maka-hil, while his remaining sixteen stepbrothers formed the Baha Diriyeh. Aman had ten sons, the eldest of whom was Ahmed, who died before his father, who himself died before his old father, the aged Sultan Diriyeh. Now, as soon as Sultan Diriyeh died there was trouble as to his successor.

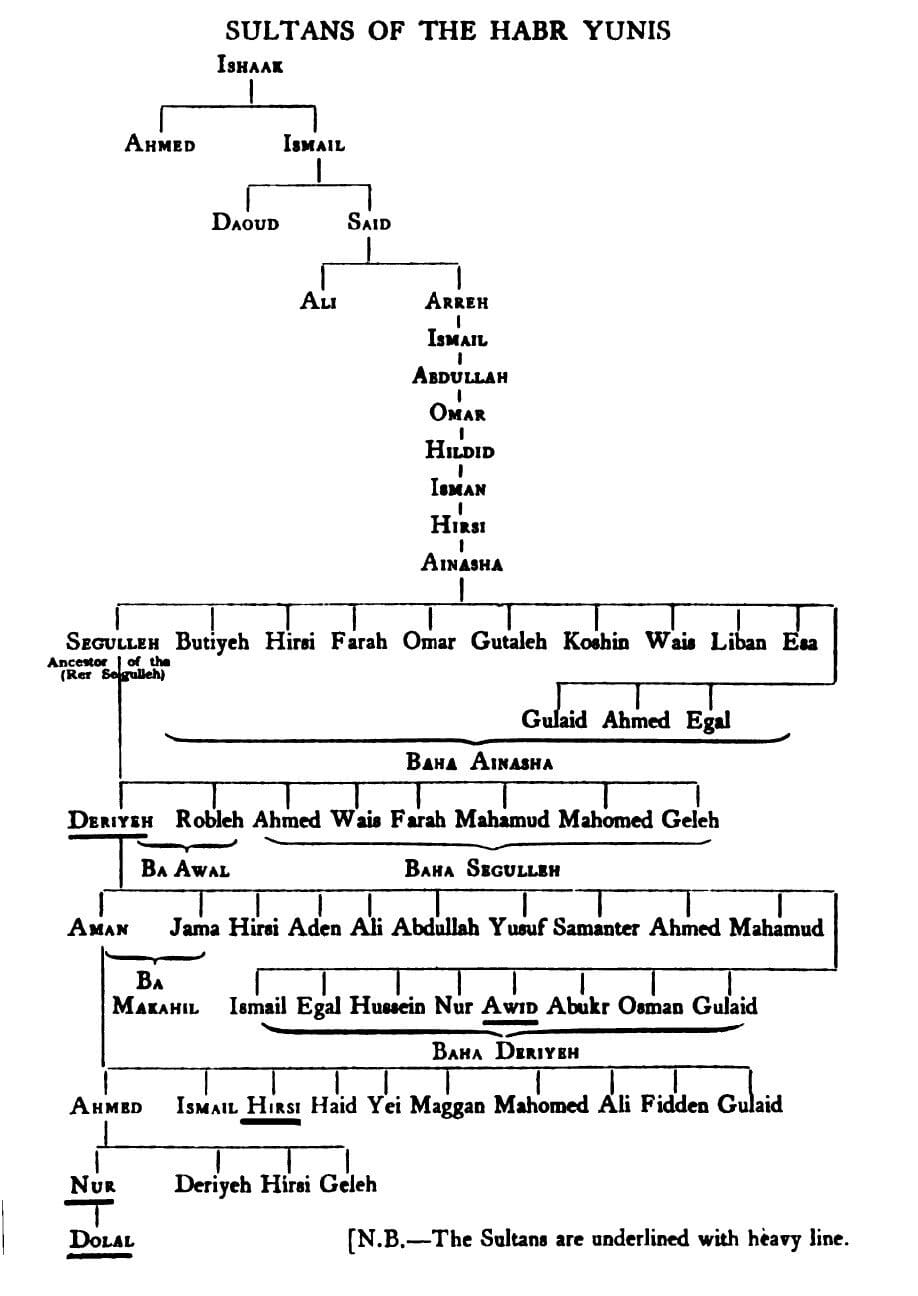
Sultan Diiriye's Genealogy

=== Reer Deria Sugulle sub-clans ===
Deria's wives were Awraleh, Madedo, Ebleh, Mardal and a fifth woman of the Habr Awal Makahil, these five wives would bore him a total of eighteen sons who would later on form the Baha Deria and Ba Makahil sub clans.

- Jama Diria
- Hirsi Diria (Father of Sultan Madar)
- Aadan Diria
- Ali Diria
- Abdullah Diria
- Yusuf Diria
- Samatar Diria
- Ahmed Diria
- Mahmud Diria
- Ismail Diria
- Egal Diria
- Hussein Diria
- Nur Diria
- Awad Diria (Sultan Awad)
- Abokor Diria
- Cismaan Diria
- Guuleed Diria
- Ammaan Diria (Reer Ammaan)
  - Axmed Amaan (father of Sultan Nur)
  - Ismaaciil Amaan
  - Hersi Aman (Sultan Hersi Aman)
  - Hayd Amaan
  - Yey Amaan
  - Magan Amaan
  - Ali Amaan
  - Fidhin Amaan
  - Muhumed Amaan
  - Guled Amaan

Preceded by Sugulleh Ainashe	Habr Yunis Sultanate	Succeeded by Hersi Aman

== See also ==
- Farah Guled contemporary of Diria and 2nd Grand Sultan of the Isaaq
- Hassan Farah contemporary of Xirsi Amaan and 3rd Grand Sultan of Isaaq
