= Agama robecchii =

Conservation status
- Least Concern (IUCN 3.1)

Scientific classification
- Kingdom: Animalia
- Phylum: Chordata
- Class: Reptilia
- Order: Squamata
- Suborder: Iguania
- Family: Agamidae
- Genus: Agama
- Species: A. robecchii

Binomial name
- Agama robecchii Boulenger, 1892

Species of lizard

Agama robecchii, commonly known as Robecchii's agama, is a species of lizard in the family Agamidae. The species is endemic to the Horn of Africa.

== Taxonomy and etymology ==
A. robecchii was discovered by Italian explorer Luigi Robecchi Bricchetti in Somalia, and described by British herpetologist George Albert Boulenger of the Natural History Museum (London) in 1892. Boulenger named the species robecchii in honor of said explorer.

== Geographic range ==
A. robecchii is present in eastern Ethiopia and northern Somalia.

== Behavior and habitat ==
A diurnal and terrestrial species, A. robecchii lives in sandy plains, in holes in the ground.

== Description ==
Agama robecchii has a tail longer than its head and body. The body is not depressed. The head does not show a nuchal crest, only a few spinose, not lanceolate scales. The whole of the dorsum is beset with larger spines, each of which has a ring of smaller spines at its base.
