= Ahmed Said Ahmed =

Somali footballer (born 1998)

Personal information
- Date of birth: 4 July 1998 (age 28)
- Place of birth: Mogadishu, Somalia
- Height: 1.89 m (6 ft 2 1/2 in)
- Positions: Defender; midfielder

Team information
- Current team: VJS
- Number: 88

Youth career
- VJS
- –2016: PK-35 Vantaa

Senior career*
Years	Team	Apps	(Gls)
2015–2016	PK-35 Vantaa	11	(0)
2017	IF Gnistan	4	(0)
2017	Grankulla IFK	2	(0)
2018	NJS	8	(0)
2019	AC Kajaani	0	(0)
2019–	VJS	13	(0)

International career^{‡}
2019–	Somalia	10	(0)
- * Club domestic league appearances and goals as of 01:00, 12 September 2019 (UTC) ‡ National team caps and goals as of 15:45, 3 April 2022 (UTC)

Ahmed Said Ahmed (Somali: Axmed Siciid; born 4 July 1998) is a Somali professional footballer who plays as a defender for Kakkonen club VJS and the Somalia national team.

== Club career ==
In 2015, Said Ahmed joined PK-35 Vantaa after playing in VJS's youth academy. Said Ahmed made one appearance for PK-35 in the 2015 Ykkönen, as the club gained promotion to the Veikkausliiga. Ahmed made ten appearances for PK-35 in the 2016 Veikkausliiga, as the club were relegated back to the Ykkönen. During the 2017 Ykkönen season, Said Ahmed played for IF Gnistan and Grankulla IFK, making four and two appearances respectively. Ahead of the 2018 season, Said Ahmed signed for Kakkonen club NJS, making eight first team league appearances for the club. On 26 January 2019, Said Ahmed made a solitary appearance for AC Kajaani in a 4–1 Finnish Cup defeat against KTP, before joining VJS.

== International career ==
On 5 September 2019, Said Ahmed made his debut for Somalia in a 1–0 win against Zimbabwe, marking Somalia's first ever FIFA World Cup qualification victory.

== Personal life ==
Ahmed Said Ahmed is the brother of the footballer Abdulkadir Said Ahmed and the politician Suldaan Said Ahmed.

He holds Finnish citizenship.
