= Awad Deria =

Sultan Awad Deria سلطان عوض ديريا
- 4th Sultan of the Habr Yunis Sultanate
- Reign: 1879–1892
- Predecessor: Hersi Aman
- Successor: Nur Ahmed Aman
- Born: 1830
- Died: 1892 (aged 61–62)
- House: Ainanshe
- Religion: Sunni Islam

Sultan Awad Deria (Somali: Suldaan Cawad Suldaan Diiriye; 1830–1892) was a Somali ruler and the 4th Sultan of the Habr Yunis during the late nineteenth century.

== Biography ==
Awad was among the youngest sons of Sultan Diiriye who had a total of eighteen sons from five wives. Awad along with three other sons were born to the Sultan's wife, Ebla, and are collectively known as the Bah Ebla.

== Civil war ==
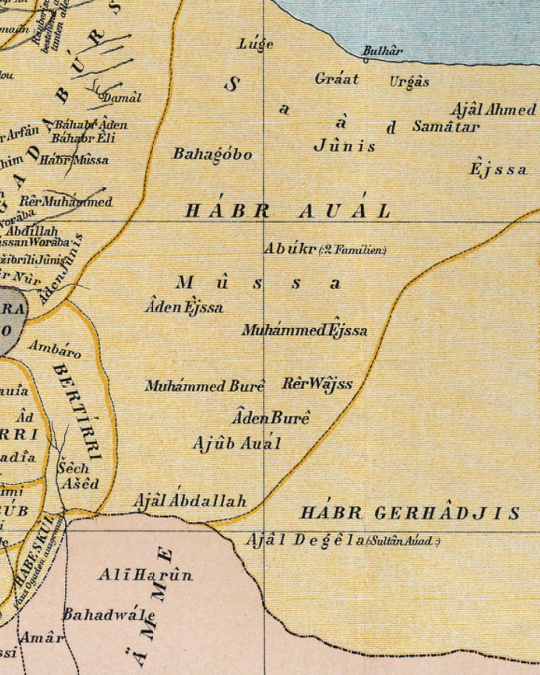
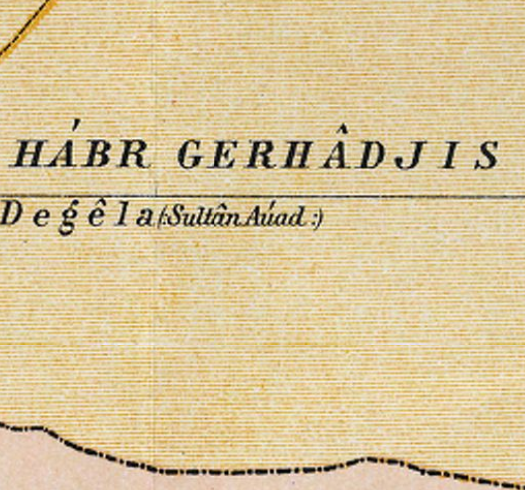
German map of the Horn showing Sultan Awad's domain, 1885

After the death of Sultan Hersi Aman, the Baha Diiriye and Baha Makahil sections of the Sugulle dynasty vied for the Sultanship, which divided the Habr Yunis clan into two factions, one faction led by Guled Haji crowned Awad of the Baha Diiriye and the other Nur Ahmed Aman. The two Sultans engaged in a lengthy war and divided the Sultanate's territory, where Awad ruled the Sultanate from his chosen capital of Burao. Frank Linsly James visited Sultan Awad at Burao in 1884 and witnessed the dissenting situation between the two Sultans. Describing the political situation in the region, he writes:

It appeared the great Habr Gerhajis tribe was divided into two rival factions, the one owning allegiance to Sultan Owd, the other to his cousin, Sultan Noor. Between these two the country was about evenly divided, and the border-line was an everlasting scene of wars and rumours of wars, cattle raids, and attempted murders.

The Haber-Gerhajis tribe had formerly been under one Sultan and were very powerful, making frequent raids into Ogadayn, but on his death, two cousins, Awad and Nur, divided the country between them.

Awad was killed after a decade long war, allowing Nur to establish himself at Burao and rule over the entirety of the Habr Yunis. The Baha Diiriye still did not concede defeat and would eventually choose Awad's nephew, Madar, as their successor following Nur's death.

Preceded by Nur Ahmed Aman	Habr Yunis Sultanate	Succeeded by Dolal Nur / Madar Hersi

== See also ==
- Somali aristocratic and court titles
