= Sugulle Ainanshe =

Sultan Sugulleh Ainashe سلطان سوغوله بن عيَناشي
- 1st Sultan of the Habr Yunis Sultanate
- Reign: Early 1800s
- Predecessor: Position established
- Successor: Deria Sugulleh
- Religion: Sunni Islam

Sultan Sugulle Ainanshe (Somali: Suldaan Sugulle Caynaanshe Xirsi) was the first Sultan of the Habr Yunis and the founder of the Habr Yunis Sultanate.

== Biography ==
The Habr Yunis Sultanate broke off from the Isaaq Sultanate during the reign of Sultan Farah Guled. The first Habr Yunis chief to assume the title Sultan was Sugulleh Ainanshe of the Ismail Arrah clan, son of Ainanshe, a traditional chief.

The sultanate inherited the profitable trade routes leading into the Sheikh mountains and Burao from the Isaaq Sultanate and reached a pinnacle under Sultan Hersi Aman before being engulfed in civil wars after his considerable power caused a rebellion to break out in the late 1870s. Sugulleh was succeeded by his son Diriyeh Sugule in the mid 19th century who had his capital at Wadhan

Preceded by Position Established	Habr Yunis Sultanate	Succeeded by Deria Sugulleh

== See also ==
- Somali aristocratic and court titles
