= Osman Ali (sultan) =

Sultan Osman Sultan Ali Sultan Madar السلطان عثمان سلطان علي سلطان مدار
- 9th Sultan of the Habr Yunis Sultanate
- Reign: 1979-
- Predecessor: Suldan Ali
- Born: 1957 (age 68–69)
- Religion: Sunni Islam

Sultan Osman Sultan Ali (Somali: Suldaan Osman Suldaan Ali Suldaan Madar; born 1957) is a Somali ruler and the 9th and current Sultan of the Habr Yunis Sultanate.

Preceded by Ali Madar	Habr Yunis Sultanate	Succeeded by Incumbent

== See also ==
- Somali aristocratic and court titles
