= Luigi Robecchi Bricchetti =

Italian explorer (1855–1926)

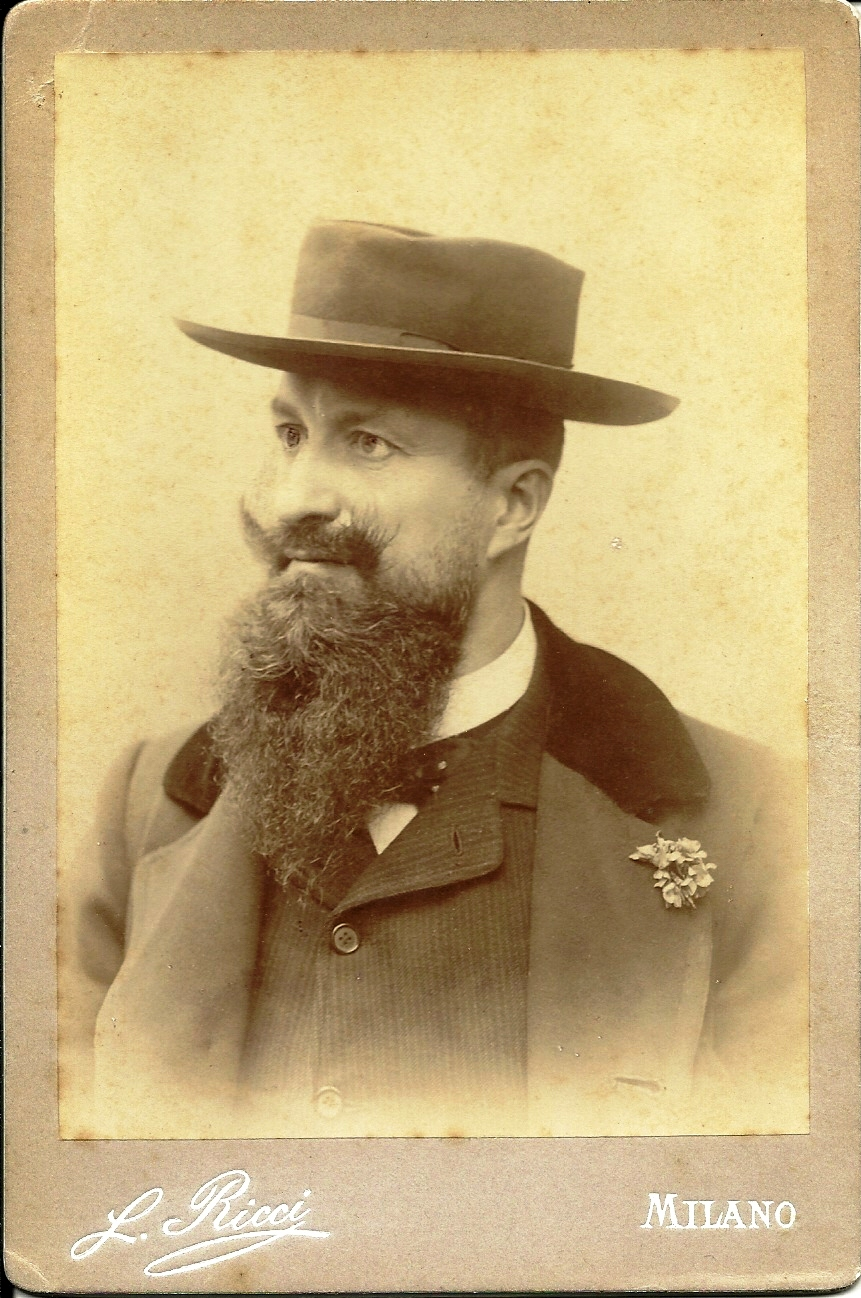
- Luigi Robecchi Bricchetti
- Born: 21 May 1855; Pavia
- Died: 31 May 1926; Pavia
- Education: Karlsruhe Institute of Technology
- Children: Mabruc Robecchi Bricchetti
- Relatives: Ercole Robecchi (father); Teresa Bricchetti (mother)
- Scientific career
- Fields: Explorer, geographer, cartographer naturalist.

Luigi Robecchi Bricchetti (21 May 1855 – 31 May 1926) was an Italian explorer, geographer, cartographer and naturalist.

== Biography ==
Robecchi Bricchetti was the illegitimate son of Ercole Robecchi, a land owner from Zerbolò, and a young seamstress, Teresa Brichetti. He grew up with his mother and used her name until his father recognized the paternity after a lengthy legal battle. In 1874 Luigi changed his family name to Robecchi Bricchetti.

Robecchi Bricchetti enrolled at the faculty of Civil Engineering at the University of Pavia and then continued his education at the University of Zurich and the Karlsruhe Institute of Technology, where he eventually graduated.

He was a person of many cultural and scientific interests (ethno-anthropology, geography, geology, zoology, etc.), with an excellent knowledge of languages, including German and Arabic, which he spoke fluently. He dedicated himself intensively to study and combat widespread slavery in Africa.

A classic nineteenth-century explorer, he returned to his home in Pavia from his travels with a large number of objects and African documents. During his last trip to Africa in 1903 he freed a Somali Bantu woman and her son from slavery and brought them with him to Pavia. He later legally adopted the boy, who took the name of Mabruc Robecchi Bricchetti. Robecchi Bricchetti died in Pavia in 1926.

== Travels and explorations ==
Robecchi Bricchetti spent much of his time travelling to Africa. He was the first European explorer to visit extensively the Horn of Africa region, also referred to as Benadir, to which he gave its current name of Somalia.

In 1885, he travelled to Egypt, from where he reached the Oasis of Siwa in the Libyan desert. finds In 1888 he travelled to Zeila in Somalia. He then crossed the Danakil Desert, and arrived in Harrar, Ethiopia, where he lived for several months and conducted a series of scientific studies . He collected many poems circulating in the region at the time including some that covered the sage Guled Haji and the demise of the powerful Sultan Hersi Aman.

In 1890, he returned to Somalia where he explored the then unknown region of Hobyo. His journey covered an area of more than two thousand kilometers until he reached Alula, and is documented by a large number of maps and photographs that he put together during the trip.

Between 1890 and 1891 he led an expedition to the unknown territory of Migiurtinia, where he produced significant cartographic and ethnographic observations. In 1896, he made a new crossing of the Libyan desert up to the Oasis of Siwa. His last known trip to Africa was in 1903.

== The scientific collection ==
Robecchi Bricchetti's collection of insects was initially assigned to a team of specialists (Carlo Emery for ants, Raffaello Gestro for beetles, Pietro Pavesi for spiders and scorpions, Paolo Magretti for wasps and grasshoppers, Arturo Issel for the shells, etc.). The reptiles were sent to the herpetologist George Albert Boulenger at the British Museum. As a tribute, Boulenger dedicated to Robecchi Bricchetti a pygmy chameleon (Rhampholeon robecchii, now considered a subspecies of Rieppeleon kerstenii ) and an agama (Agama robecchii ). He was also honoured by the ichthyologist Decio Vinciguerra, who named a catfish after him, Clarias robecchii, synonym of Clarias gariepinus.

Robecchi Bricchetti left a will in which he donated the majority of his archive to the Ethnographic and Anthropological Museum in Florence and the Pigorini National Museum of Prehistory and Ethnography in Rome. The Natural History Museum, Pavia, received his photo-archive, his library and a selection of weapons and items collected during his thirty years of travels and explorations.

The Robecchi Bricchetti Museum in the Visconti Castle (Pavia) is dedicated to him.

== Bibliography ==
=== Books ===
- Robecchi Bricchetti, Luigi (1881). Cenno intorno alle opere di sistemazione e bonifica eseguite nel vasto tenimento di Villamaggiore e Crosina posto in provincia di Milano e di ragione dell'illustriss. signore barone Sabino Leonino. Milan: Premiata Tipografia e litografia degli Ingegneri.
- All’oasi di Giove Ammone, Fratelli Treves, Milan, 1890
- Tradizioni storiche dei Somali Migiurtini raccolte in Obbia, Ministero Affari Esteri, Rome, 1891
- I nostri protetti (i Galla), Marelli, Pavia, 1894
- Nell’Harrar, Galli, Milan, 1896
- Somalia e Benadir: viaggio di esplorazione nell’Africa orientale, prima traversata della Somalia per incarico della Società Geografica Italiana, Carlo Aliprandi, Milan, 1899
- Nel paese degli aromi. Diario di una esplorazione nell’Africa orientale: da Obbia ad Alula, Cogliati, Milan, 1902

=== Periodicals ===
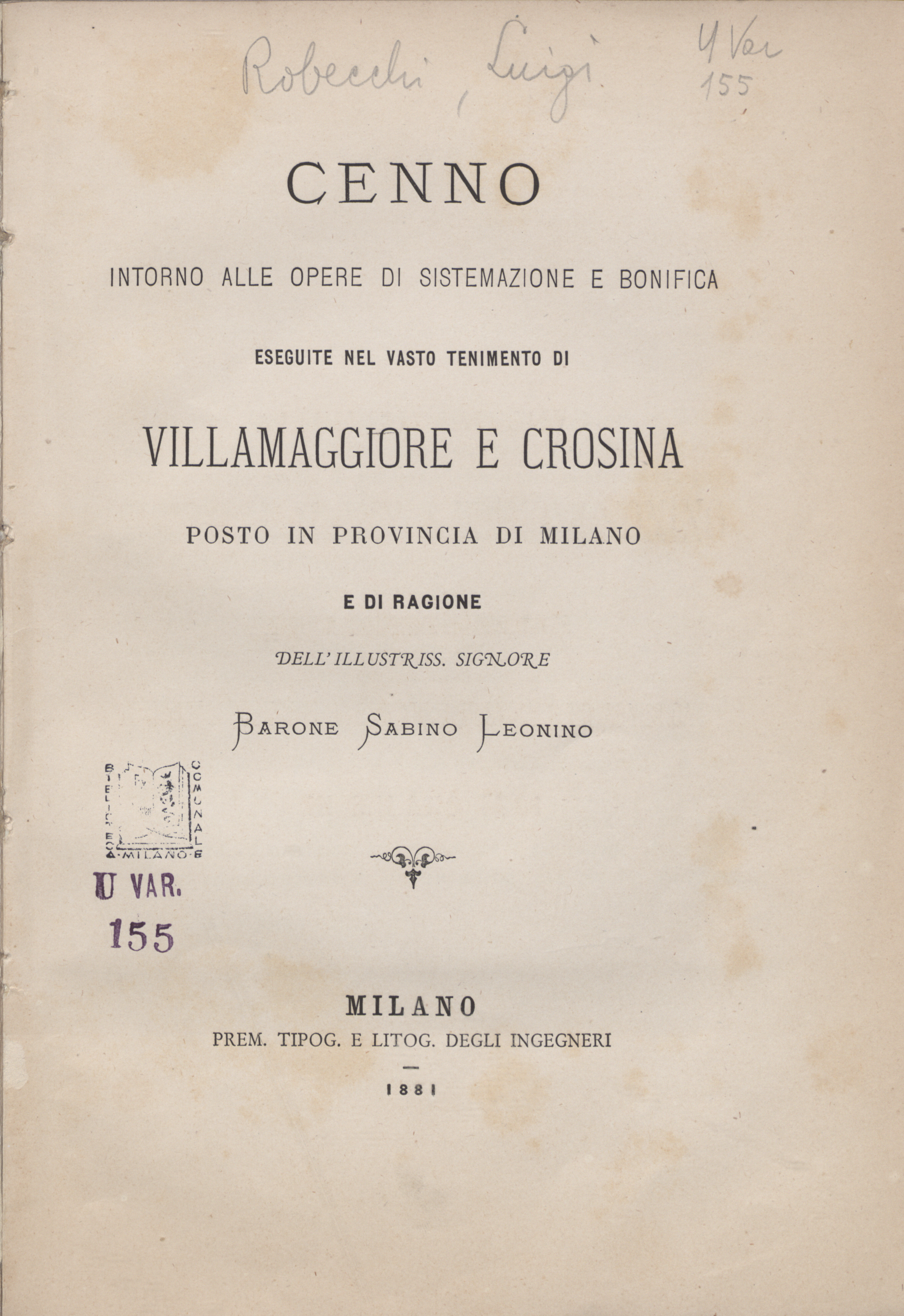
Luigi Robecchi Bricchetti, Cenno intorno alle opere di sistemazione e bonifica (1881)

- "Lettere dall’Harrar", in Bollettino della sezione fiorentina della Società Africana d’Italia, vol. IV, 1888, p. 243; vol. V, 1889, p. 57; vol. VI, 1890, p. 130
- "Lettere dall’Harrar", in Bollettino della Società Africana d’Italia, vol. VIII, no. I-II, 1889, pp. 35–38
- "Lettera dall’Harrar sul Borelli", in Bollettino della Società Geografica Italiana, vol. III, 1889, pp. 27–40
- "Sulla via dell’Harrar", in La Riforma illustrata, vol. VIII (“L’Africa Italiana”), 1890
- "Da Obbia ad Alula", in Bollettino della Società Geografica Italiana, vol. III-IV, 1890
- "Un’escursione attraverso il deserto libico all’oasi di Siuva", in Bollettino della Società Geografica Italiana, vol. III, 1890, pp. 869–879 and 996-1008
- "Viaggio nel paese dei Somali", in Bollettino della Società Geografica Italiana, vol. III, 1890, pp. 869–879 and 996-1008
- "Esplorazione di Obbia: rapporto", in Bollettino della Società Africana d’Italia, vol. IX, 1890, pp. 124–130, 204, 245-261
- "Gl’Isa Somali", in Bollettino della Società Africana d’Italia, 1890, pp. 15–19
- "Harrar: ricordi di viaggio", in L'Illustrazione Italiana, vol. XII, 1890, p. 163 and p. 190
- "Harrar", in La Tribuna Illustrata, vol. I, no. 46, 1890, pp. 715–717
- "In viaggio per l’Harrar", in Nuova Antologia, 16 November 1890
- "Lingue parlate Somali, Galla e Harari: Note e studi raccolti ed ordinati nell’Harrar", in Bollettino della Società Geografica Italiana, vol. III, 1890, pp. 257, 271, 380-391, 689-708
- "Ricordi di un soggiorno nell’Harrar", in Bollettino della Società Geografica Italiana, January 1891
- "La prima traversata della penisola dei Somali", in Bollettino della Società Geografica Italiana, May 1893
- "Il commercio di Tripoli", in Memorie della Società Geografica Italiana, vol. VI, 10 April 1896

== Additional References ==
- Ettore Fabietti, Luigi Robecchi Bricchetti e la prima traversata della Somalia, G. B. Paravia, Turin, 1940
- Francesco Surdich, "L’immagine dell’Africa e dell’Africano nelle esplorazioni di Luigi Robecchi Bricchetti", in Storia delle Esplorazioni, volume V, Bozzi Editore, Genoa, 1983
- Silvio Zavatti, Uomini verso l’ignoto: Gli esploratori nel mondo, Gilberto Bagaloni Editore, Ancona, 1979
- Gabriele Gregoletto, Pianeta Terra: Dizionario di navigatori, esploratori, scienziati e viaggiatori che, con le loro azioni o imprese piccole e grandi, contribuirono principalmente alla conoscenza geografica della Terra, Cornedo Vicentino, 2004
