= Suldaan Said Ahmed =

Finnish politician (born 1993)

Member of the Finnish Parliament for Helsinki
- In office 9 September 2021 – 4 April 2023

Personal details
- Born: February 12, 1993 (age 33) Mogadishu, Somalia
- Citizenship: Finnish
- Party: Left Alliance
- Website: suldaan.fi

Suldaan Said Ahmed (born 12 February 1993) is a Finnish politician who is a member of the Helsinki City Council for the Left Alliance. Said Ahmed served as a Member of the Finnish Parliament for Helsinki from September 2021 to April 2023, and is the first Somalin-born member of the Finnish parliament. In July 2022, Said Ahmed was appointed Finland's Minister for Foreign Affairs' Special Representative on Peace Mediation in the Horn of Africa. Since April 2023, he has also been a member of the Peace Mediation Roster of the Ministry of Foreign Affairs.

On 23 January 2024, Minister for Foreign Affairs Elina Valtonen appointed Suldaan Said Ahmed as her Special Envoy on Peace Mediation in the Horn of Africa. https://um.fi/current-affairs/-/asset_publisher/gc654PySnjTX/content/suldaan-said-ahmed-ulkoministerin-rauhanvalityksen-erityisedustajaksi-afrikan-sarven-alueelle-1

== Life and career ==
Said Ahmed was born in Mogadishu and immigrated to Finland in 2008 through family reunification. He lived in Kontiolahti, North Karelia, and moved to Helsinki in 2011. Said Ahmed has a security guard education and has also worked as a community worker for the Helsinki Deaconess Foundation.

Said Ahmed was elected to the Helsinki City Council in the 2017 municipal elections and re-elected in 2021. In the 2019 parliamentary election Said Ahmed became a vice deputy. As the MP Paavo Arhinmäki was selected the Helsinki Deputy Mayor, Said Ahmed took his place in September 2021. He was not reelected in the 2023 parliamentary election.

== Family ==
Suldaan Said Ahmed is the brother of the footballers Ahmed Said Ahmed and Abdulkadir Said Ahmed.
