= Hersi Aman =

Sultan Hersi Aman سلطان حِرْسِي أمان
- 3rd Sultan of the Habr Yunis Sultanate
- Reign: 1854-1879
- Predecessor: Deria Sugulleh
- Successor: Nur Ahmed Aman , Jama Hersi
- Born: 1824
- Died: 1879 (aged 54–55)
- House: Ainanshe
- Religion: Sunni Islam

Sultan Hersi Aman (Somali: Suldaan Xirsi Ammaan; 1824–1879) was a Somali ruler. He was the 3rd Sultan of the Habr Yunis Sultanate.

== Biography ==
=== Reign ===
Hersi Aman belonged to the Bah Makahil section of the Deria Sugulle dynasty. He succeeded his grandfather, Sultan Deria Sugulleh, and ruled from the mid-1850s to 1879. Hersi's father Aman Deria was an important Habr Yunis chieftain. Vesme Baudi travelling through Habr Je'lo country east of Burao in 1889 gives an account of Aman's tomb.

At nine o'clock we arrived at Baiadowal, on the Thug Dehr, a charming site, where the trees form a small forest, in which the most delightful coolness is enjoyed. A few hundred meters away there is a tomb surrounded by a palisade of tree trunks made with care. There rests a chieftain of the Habr Junis, by name Ohman-Dhirrin [Aman Deria]..his tribe had intermingled with the Habr Gialeh, and when that chief had died, they had made him that tomb with a palisade in memory of his great merits.

Hersi is remembered for his successful conquests and expansion of Garhajis territory in the Haud. His reign was abruptly ended when he was killed in a battle against the kindred Baha Sugulleh.

In the year 1873, Swiss explorer H.G Haggenmacher met Hersi during his travels through Somaliland and describes him as such:

I received a visit from Hersi Aman, the most powerful chieftain of the Habar Yunis... Hersi Aman is a stout man, with piercing eyes, firm language and quick movements. He is a relative of Hersi Sultan and through personal courage has attained his current power

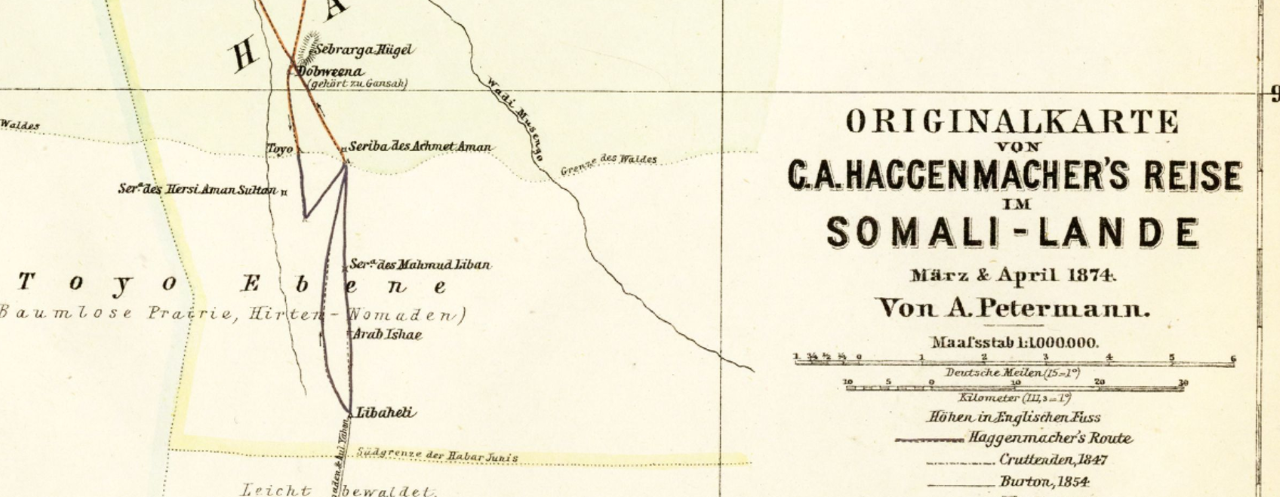
German Map from 1874 showcasing Sultan Hersi Aman's general location

==== Battle with Kirh ====
German explorer Felix Rosen who visited British Somaliland and Ethiopian Empire in 1907 met and discussed with northern Somalis and was told about Hersi and other legendary figures who had died in the decades prior. One such story was the battle between Sultan Hersi & the famed warrior Kirh of the Rer Samatar subclan. Sultan Hersi's powerful section of Rer Ammaan had been raided by Kirh and his Rer Samatar. Given the fierce reputation of their target, Kirh's companions were uneasy and fled after the raid, leaving Kirh for dead. His wife began to mourn alongside his kinsmen but to everyone's surprise, Kirh had survived the wilderness and emerged with 100 camels he had captured. This feat impressed Hersi and there was no attempt to recover the lost stock.

Kirh recited a boastful gabay

O yalahe hoi, o yalahe hoi, yalahe
My, our lore of death has spread through all tribes near and far
And we felt so safe that we spurned the camels with the lance to prick our mark of possession
Let the animals move slowly so that the camel fillings do not become tired
At the time when the cowards among our companions took flight and the hiding places
Then the lion's mane grew around our shoulders
My wife! little was our Seriba; I have filled ten Serbs for you
Come, now fill the milk baskets; we have plundered the tribe of Amman

When fighting would eventually resume, Hersi called out inquiring where Kirh was in the heat of battle. In response, a spear flew and grazed the Sultan's head. Hersi grabbed the spear which Kirh had thrown and returned the favour piercing through Kirh's famed horse and embedding deep in Kirh. He would escape the battlefield despite the wound leaving Hersi and the Rer Ammaan victorious having killing one & capturing another man named Hashi.

Hersi now answered the previous gabay and mocked his opponent

How Kirh first bragged so much - now his speeches are silent!
Once the Samatar tribe was large and rich, now it is small and become poor
Now their caravans are afraid, even a day's march from Amud to go so far!
We killed one of their men, we caught one of them, and one we drove the lance through the body
Tell us, according to the truth, O Hashi! About which of the three you mourn the most that we like from your tribe?

Hashi having been challenged by the Sultan spoke

That you killed one of our men was by fate
Predestined that you captured me does no harm
But no mother has ever given birth to a hero like Kirh

Hersi being moved by these words spared Hashi from the usual deadly fate of a captive instead giving him a fine horse and sent medicines & gifts with Hashi to deliver to Kirh. Kirh would return the favour finally reconciling the feud.

==== Downfall ====
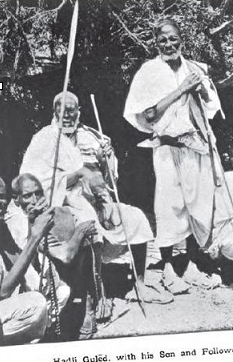
Haji Guled in 1906.

Hersi Aman's increasing grip and autocratic rule over the Habr Yunis had fermented some resentment amongst his direct subclan (Rer Sugule) and some stood to challenge him. The wise Guled Haji another prominent member and elder of the Rer Sugule had a fallout with Sultan Hersi and his son was killed by one of Hersis' sons. Hersi's son approached his father and implored him to pay the traditional mag compensation to Guled for the loss of his child. Hersi arrogantly rebuffed his son and all out conflict would break out between Ba Awal (Hersi's branch) and that of Guled the Baho Sugule branches of the Rer Sugule.

Fighting would continue and the commander of Guled's clans Warsame had slain 3 brothers of the Ba Awal and his fighters captured the young Jama Amume a 17 years old also known as 'Jama the Mute' due to his inaudible voice a grandson of Sultan Deria Sugule who was from a different house. Warsame would have also killed him if his men didn't pleaded with him urging Warsame to sparr the last son for the poor mother. With a contempt Warsame spared young Ammume who was held in another camp with Warsame with belittling the teenager said "let the mother I rendered childless use this to beg for offals" . That insult deeply wounded the soft-spoken Amume and he would admit it

In his poetry later.

How long it took Jama Ammume to prepare to face the tirelessly Warsame oral history does mention. During the next clash Jama would mortally wound Warsame and recited this poem victoriously. In it he praises his horse 'Hamar' that performed well that day and speaks about Warsame. These poems were recorded by Luigi Robecchi Bricchetti in 1885 in the journal.

Col aloosan Xamarow haddii xalay la ugaanshay
Heensaha hadddaan kugu itibay goor aleyl dhexe ah
Indhaalaha haddaan kuu xidh-xidhay suuman la adkeeyay
Isha bari hadii loo kiciyo awrtii reer Sugule
Kuwii lays aqoon jiray haddii lagu ogaan duulay
Abaanduule Guuleed (Guled Haji) hadii ubaxa loo gooyay
Waa boqor agtiisa'e hadday "ililidii" yeedh'dhay
Usha Daba-xidh ooddiyo haddii laysu wada giijay
Eebada haddii laysku riday ilig-jartii hooto
Abdikayba intii hore hadaan dabo adeegaayay
Kolku ina qolyaeedkii sidii aarka nagu qayshay
Anigoo aqoon jirin haddii lay ogeysiiyay
Onkad baxay la moodyow kolkan amarka qaadsiiyay
Doc aroorka uguma tago orodka saydhshaaye
Oogada hadduu igala maray agabarkuu joogo
Anna Awlaxaan siday haddaan oofta midig gooyay
Kol haddaan Warsame aayiroon Baho agoonteeyay
Kol haddaan ugaaskii ka dilay u ololiyeynaayay
Kol hadaan ka oon baxay afku aramigu jiifay
Alxamdu lilaa Eebaw haddaan umalkii qaar reebay

The Sultan Hersi himself would be killed in battle soon after and the sister of Warsame lamented for the loss of Hersi, Warsame and other relatives in this poem

Calow gaydha waxa iigu wacan geeridaan qabo'e
Caawaba gelin dhexaadkaan hadba gogosha taabtaaye
Gamas baa ku dhacay aabahaa goraygii dheeraaye
Gacmo jeedlaow Warsamaey gudurii siiyeene
Gaashaan-cade Muxumed bay giringirsheen meele
Mohammed Golaxley dhigeen geedkii Lebi-Cawle
Xirsigi madaxa ahaa waa gawraceen gacal ha waayaane

— Sister of Warsame's Lament
Translation:

O Ali, I lament the death of Geid my husband (your father)
I often wake up in the middle of the night and feel his bed
The good trick hit your father, who was as tall as a bouquet
Warsame's strong arms have disheveled vultures
Muhammad with the white shield rolled over like a wheel in the dust
They threw the slender Muhammad into the thicket where the Spitz antelopes live
They really did cut off Hersi's head (overthrew him); We have lost the leaders

One of the sons of the Sultan recited these lines looking to avenge their father

Jidhkii ina Amaan iyo la waa jalanqayaashiiye
Jirid nimaan lahayn baa baqee taydu ii jarane
Hadii nabada jeelkeeda la helo waa anoon jirine
Jillow baan ahay haddi aabahay joogi lagu raadin

— Son of Hersi Aman
Translation:

Gone is the flesh of elephant bulls and the great son of Amaan (Hersi)
A man with no deep roots (great lineage) might suffer fear, but mine is already cut short
The longed for peace be only found, when no more do I exist
I am as useless as the Jill tree if upon its mount (steed) my father's revenge is not sought

Following Hersi's death the Rer Sugule gathered and the issue of compensation for the Sultan's death was a pressing issue. The conflict originally starting because no compensation had been paid to Guled Haji for his son. They decided that none would be paid and they would try to put this conflict to rest.

Maxamed Bulxan's poem touches on the unique nature of the meeting

Beenowdey Habar Yoonistii bu’aha waallayde
Reer Sugulle gooddiga bankuu baarcaddii dhigaye
Iyana baarax uma soo shiraan beri samaagiiye

— Maxamed Bulxan Dal Dhammeeye
Translation:

The Habar Yoonis who became false with their fighting talk
The Reer Sugulle at the edge of the open place put down the young ones
They don’t meet in an open place in good times

Despite this 2 year conflict culminating in Hersi's death it would not entirely end. Both Awad Deria and Nur Ahmed Aman were proclaimed Sultan by their respective branches (Baho Sugule) and (Ba Awal) with Sultan Nur eventually triumphing as the uncontested Sultan. During the period of division, the rival sultans would split Habr Yunis territory in two and the lucrative caravan routes to tax. Sultan Nur held the Jerato pass and Tuuyo plains and his rival Sultan Awad Deria secured Burao as his base until his death, with Sultan Nur ultimately taking it.

== In Poetry ==
Hersi Aman's was well remembered in tales about the powerful Sultan's downfall captured by both contemporary poets and some in the decades following his death. Salaan Carrabey in his poem Tolnimo Wa Dugsiye (Kinship is a Shelter) captures the conflict and how Hersi's ambition was the cause of so much devastation,

Reer Sugulle dakhar wiilyar baw sidey daliishiiye
Dabar qaaday Reer Diiriyihi, damaca waallaaye
Waatii degmada laysu furay Dabadi Looyaane
Dummaddii Xirsuu saaran yahay Dubur raggii yiile
Dawlaabadii boqor hadduu damacsanaa waaye
Duudsuu ku dhacay ina Ammaan dib u heshiintiiye
Denbi hadduu kasbaday Eebbeheen daayinaa jirae
Dullaamkii Qabriga hawga tudho dabaqi naareede
Nimanyahow tolnimo waa dugsiye, dunida jeedaashe

— Salaan Carrabey Tolnimo Wa Dugsiye
Translation:

The catalyst of the Reer Sugule (fall) was delivered through a head wound of a young boy
There it was in the region of lower Looyaane was the land overrun
Their blood rests upon Xirsi the scattered dead from Dubar (battle)
If he sought the domain of a king, now he lost it
The Reer Diiriye tethered down from their lofty heights
Nothing was the son of Amaan compensations worth at the end settled
whatever sin he gained its up to our lasting God .[to judge]
May he be merciful to him in the darkness of the grave sparing him from hell
Oh men, brotherhood among kin is a shelter, heed what life's worth

Ismail Mire in his famous poem Ragow Kibirka Waa Lagu Kufaa (Pride Comes Before a Fall) comments on Hersi's conquests, pride and desire to rule

Kaysaha adduun Ina Ammaan koos dhan buu helaye
Ragba keeno geli buu is-yidhi waad u korraysaaye
Isba kii arsaa’ilay ma filin kamana yaabayne
Ragow kibirka waa lagu kufaa kaa ha la ogaado

— Ismail Mire Ragaw Kibirka Waa Lagu Kufaa
Translation:

With worldly pride Ina Ammaan gained a whole land
Let all men put the horse's bit in their mouths
He said to himself ‘You are on top’
But he didn't expect the one who killed him and was taken by surprise
Oh men. Pride comes before a fall. Let that be known

Preceded by Deria Sugulleh Ainashe	Habr Yunis Sultanate	Succeeded by Nur Ahmed Aman

== See also ==
- Somali aristocratic and court titles
- Garhajis
- Guled Haji wise sage and great uncle of the Sultan.
- Sultan Deria Hassan contemporary of Hersi Aman and Grand Sultan of the Isaaq
- Isaaq
- Salaan Carrabey
- Ismail Mire
