= Oodweyne =

Odweyne Somali: Oodweyne
- Town
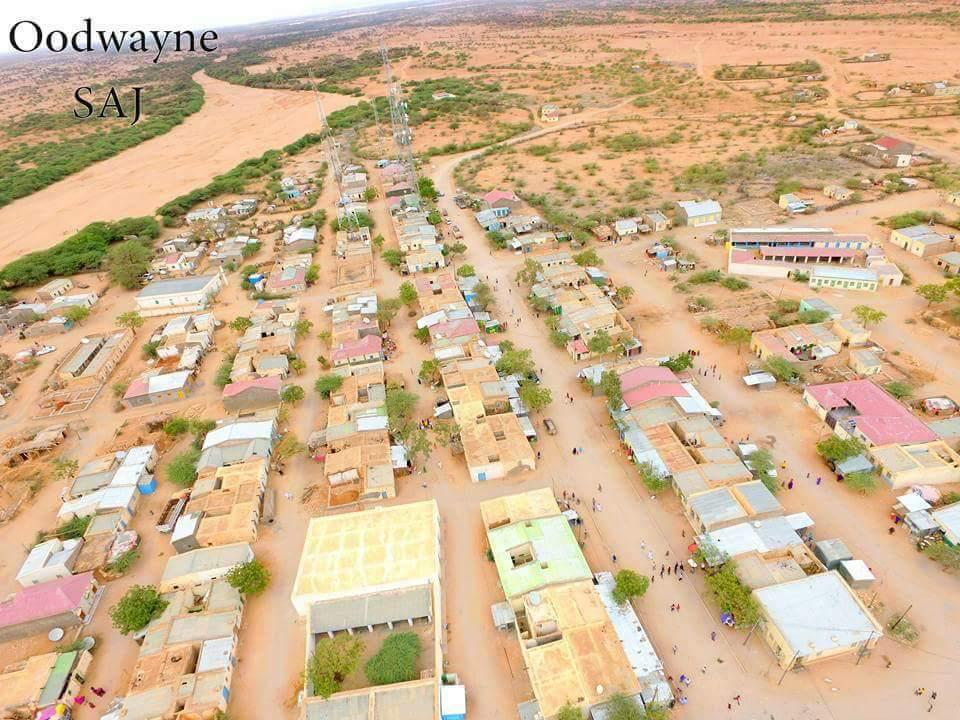

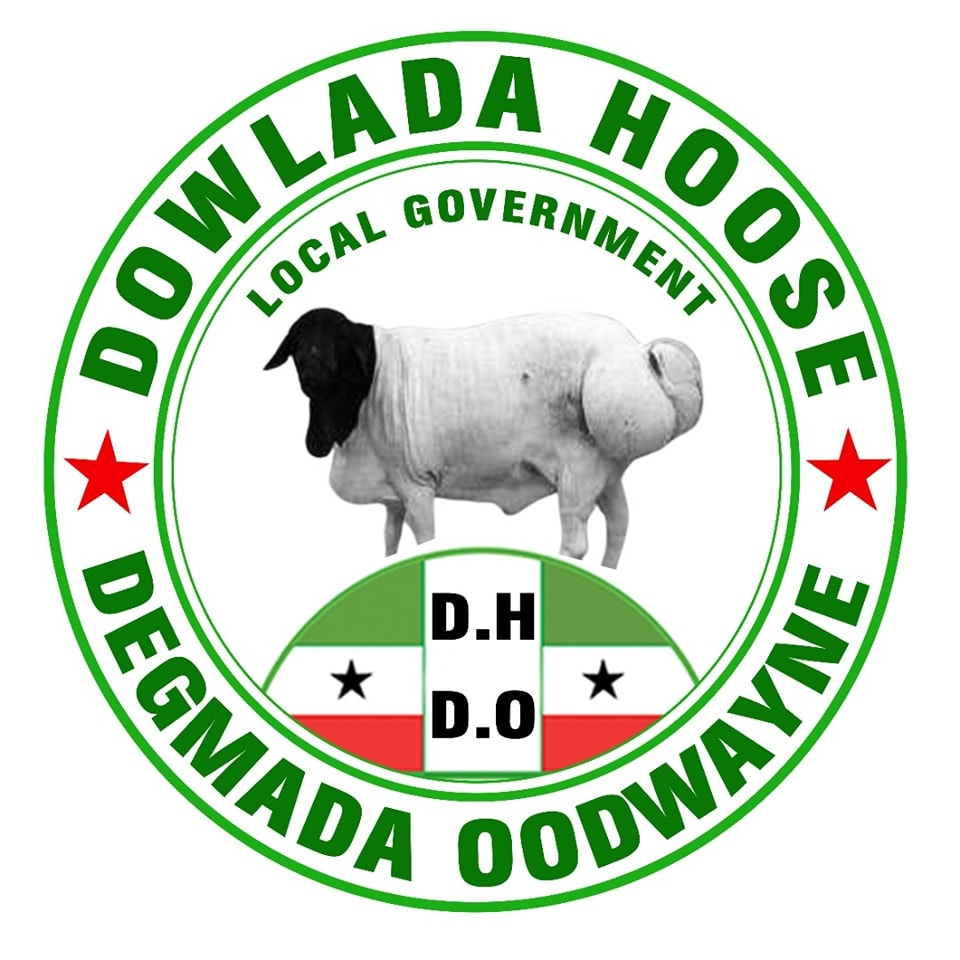
- Local council seal of Odweyne

- Location in Somaliland. Odweyne (Somaliland)
- Coordinates: 9°24′N 45°4′E
- Country: Somaliland
- Region: Togdheer
- District: Oodweyne District
- Elevation: 1,055 m (3,461 ft)

Population (2022)
  - Total: 5,491
- Time zone: UTC+3 (EAT)

Odweyne (Somali: Oodweyne, meaning "Big bush") is a town in the northwestern Togdheer region of Somaliland. It is located between Burco and Hargeisa in the western part of Togdheer region.

== Notable residents ==
- Sultan Nur Ahmed Aman, Sultan of the Habr Yunis and one of the founders of the Somali Dervish movement.
- Mohamed Haji Ibrahim Egal, two-time prime minister of Somalia and second president of Somaliland.
