= National Identification and Registration Authority (Somalia) =

Governmental organization in Somalia

NIRA Somalia
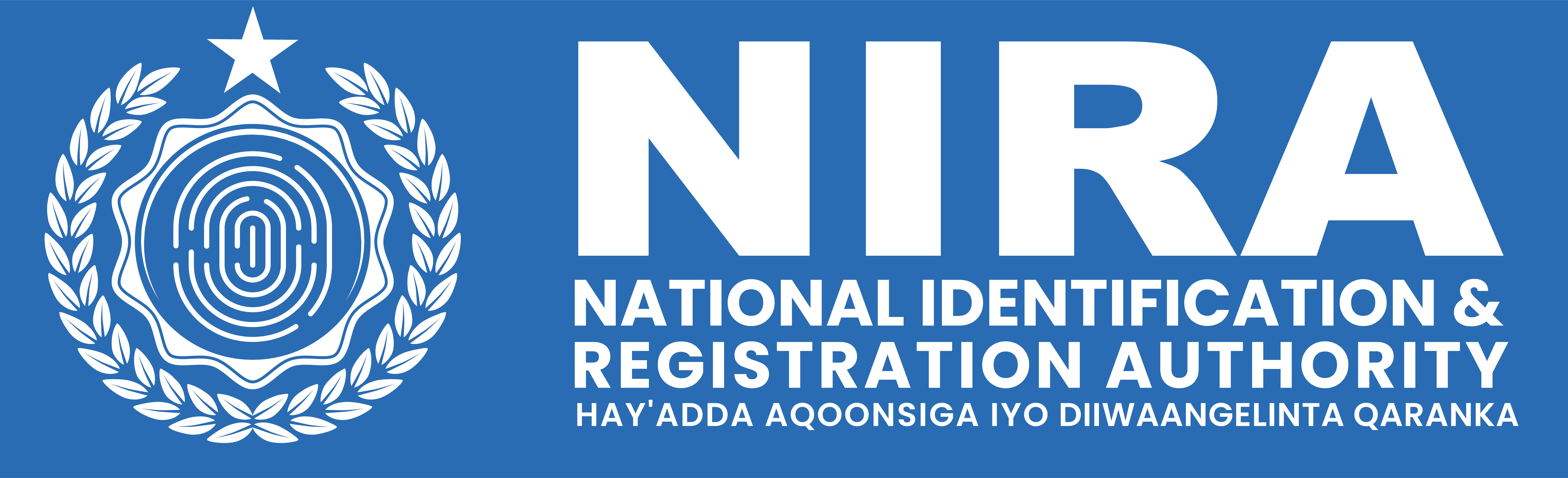
- Full Logo of National Identification and Registration Authority

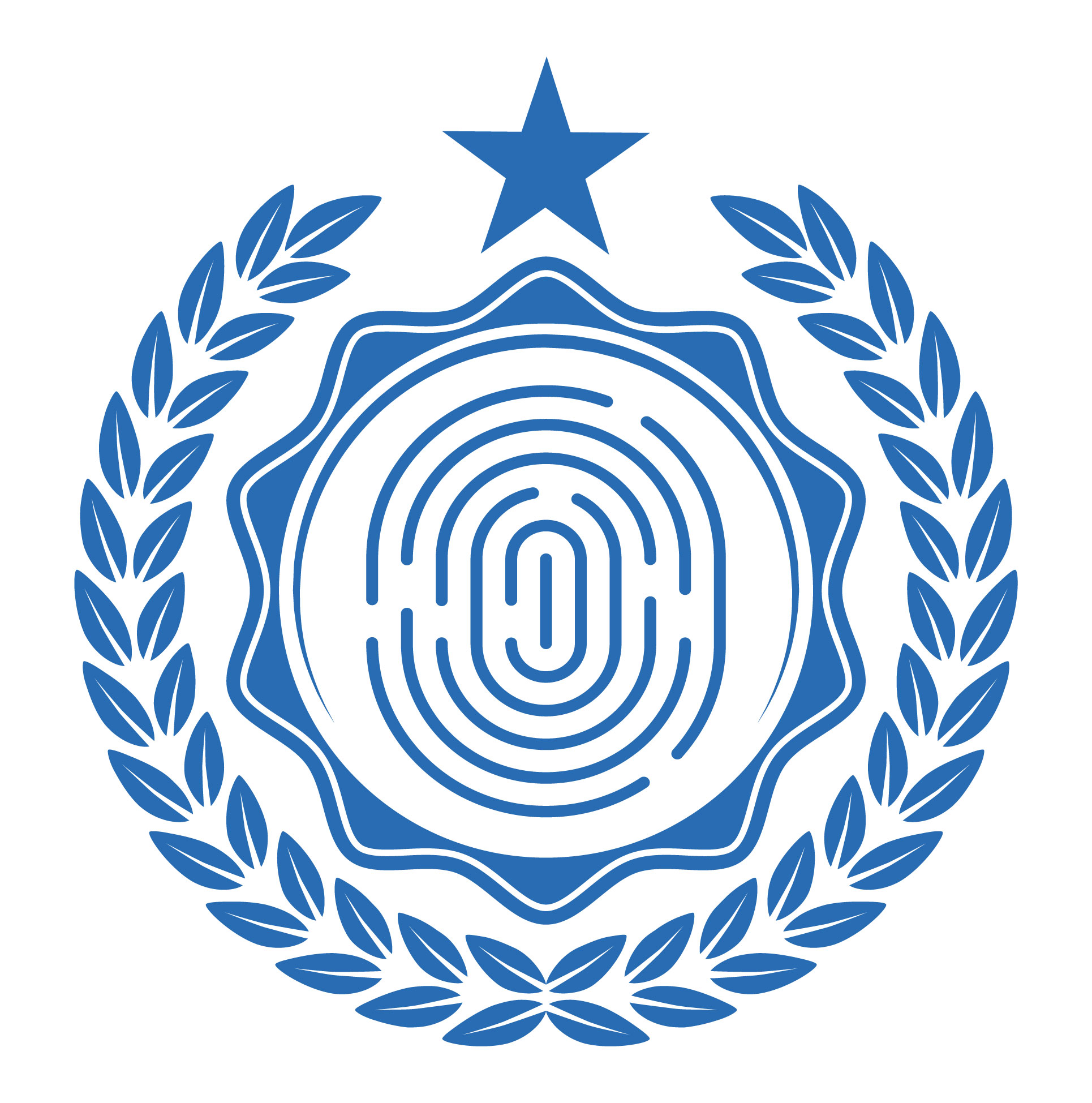
- Icon Logo of NIRA

Agency overview
- Formed: 21 March 2023
- Jurisdiction: Federal Republic of Somalia
- Employees: 120
- Annual budget: $1.9 m USD (2023)
- Agency executive: Abdiweli Abdulle Timacadde, Director General
- Website: https://nira.gov.so/

Act (Law No. 009 of March 2023).

The National Identification and Registration Authority (NIRA) Somali: Hay’adda Aqoonsiga iyo Diiwaangelinta Qaranka) is a governmental agency in Somalia. It was established under the Identification and Registration Act.

== Registration centres ==
As of 2025, the National Identification and Registration Authority (NIRA) has successfully expanded its official registration centres across multiple Federal Member States of Somalia, including:

- Banaadir (Mogadishu), Headquarters and district-level offices, including Hawl-Wadaag and Dharkenley.
- South West State (Baidoa).
- Hirshabelle (Jowhar).
- Galmudug (Dhuusamareeb).
- SSC-Khaatumo (Laascaanood).

== Responsibilities and objectives ==
The mandate of the agency is to develop and manage a national identification system. NIRA's responsibilities include creating and maintaining a database of personal identities for citizens and legal residents. The agency issues a unique identification number, known as the National Identification Number (NIN), which is intended to facilitate the recognition of individuals and qualify their access to various services.

In August 2025, the Somali government announced that, starting 1 September 2025, a valid national identification card would be required to apply for a passport. From 1 January 2026, the same requirement will apply to domestic air travel.

== Controversies ==
Somalia’s National Identification and Registration Authority (NIRA) has been rejected by Puntland and Jubaland over constitutional, legal, and structural concerns. They argue that NIRA was created without proper consultation, calling it a case of federal overreach that threatens regional autonomy.

Puntland’s Ministry of Interior, Federal Affairs, and Democratization stated that they do not recognize any federal law imposed without prior agreement. They accused the Federal Government of using the National ID project to manipulate future elections without broad political consensus.

Puntland minister of interior Abdi Farah Juha said the registration is politically motivated, aimed at enabling illegitimate elections, and distracting citizens from Somalia’s real challenges like insecurity and national unity. They also raised concerns about the security and reliability of the data being collected, warning it could fall into the wrong hands. In response, Puntland has established its own identity agency, the Puntland Identity Agency (PID).

== Operations ==
NIRA operates through a network of data centers, local and regional enrollment offices, and collaborates with other institutions. The organization utilizes technology, including biometric techniques and data analytics, to ensure data protection and privacy. These measures aim to support inter-governmental cooperation and enable the provision of public services such as voter registration and social welfare programs.

The National Identification Number streamlines administrative processes, enhances security, and mitigates fraud and corruption by verifying identities in both digital and in-person transactions.

== User accessibility and confidentiality ==
NIRA focuses on confidentiality, user experience, and accessibility, implementing initiatives such as mobile registration centers and online portals for wider reach and community engagement. The organization's broader goal is to establish a reliable ID ecosystem that fosters trust between the government and citizens and enhances Somalia's regional and international relationships.
