= Haji Muse Boqor =

Somali politician (1911–1991)

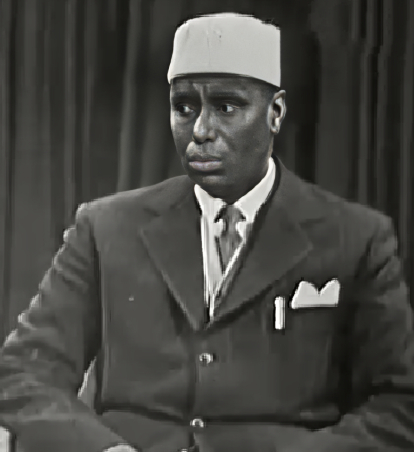

1st Somali Minister of Interior affairs
- In office 1956–1959

Personal details
- Born: Muuse Boqor Cismaan; 1911 Bargal, Majeerteeniya, Italian Somalia
- Died: 5 January 1991 (aged 79) Mogadishu, Somalia
- Cause of death: mortar wound
- Party: Somali Youth League (SYL)
- Other political affiliations: Maanifeesto
- Occupation: Politician; entrepreneur; businessman

Haji Muse Boqor Osman (Somali: Xaaji Muuse Boqor; Arabic: حاجي موسى بوقور; 1911–1991) was a politician, businessman, and Somalia's president-in-waiting following the assassination of President Sharmarke. He was the son of Boqor Osman and served as the first Minister of Interior Affairs during the Italian Trusteeship of Somalia. He was also a member of Somalia's first Parliament. Boqor was assassinated in 1991 in Mogadishu.

== Biography ==
Haji Muse Boqor was born in Bargal, a town in present-day Bari, Somalia. He memorized the Quran at a young age. In 1929, he moved to Mogadishu to continue his education.

Boqor joined the Somali Youth League, a group fighting for Somalia's independence. During the 10 years of Italian trusteeship, he served in the cabinet of Premiership of Abdullahi Isse. He became Somalia's first Minister of Interior Affairs and held this position until the country gained independence in 1960.

== Assassination and coup d'état ==
On 15 October 1969, Somali president Abdirashid Ali Sharmarke was assassinated in the Somali city of Las Anod by 22-year-old Said Yusuf Ismail, who shot the president seven times. President Sharmarke fell to the ground and died at the scene. After the president's death, Boqor was in contention to become the next president. However, just six days later, on October 21, 1969, a military coup took place. The Somali Army, led by Siad Barre, took control of the government without resistance, marking the beginning of Barre's rule over Somalia.

== Detention and death ==
After the military coup, many politicians, scholars, and religious leaders, including Boqor, were arrested, being seen as potential rivals and a threat to the new rule. After his release, he became one of the 114 members of the "Manifesto Group", which signed a peace agreement aimed at ending fighting between Siad Barre's government and United Somali Congress (USC) militias in Mogadishu.

On 5 January 1991, Boqor was assassinated by mortar shelling in the Kaaraan District.

Political offices
| Preceded by Office established | Minister of Interior Affairs (Somalia); 1956–1959 | Succeeded by Abdullahi Issa; Acting |
