= Jama Mohamed Ghalib =

Jama Mohamed Ghalib جامع محمد غالب
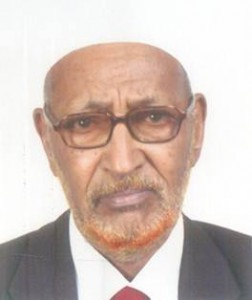

Minister of Interior of the Somali Democratic Republic
- In office 1974–1984

Police Commissioner of the Somali Democratic Republic

Vice chairman of Alliance for the Re-liberation of Somalia

Personal details
- Born: 2 January 1933 Erigavo, British Somaliland
- Died: 26 April 2022 (aged 89) Djibouti
- Resting place: Hargeisa, Somalia
- Children: 9

Jama Mohamed Ghalib (Somali: Jaamac Maxamed Ghalib, Arabic: جامع محمد غالب; 2 January 1933 – 26 April 2022) was a Somali writer, military leader, police chief and politician from Erigavo, Somalia. He was a leading figure of the Alliance for the Re-liberation of Somalia.

== Life and career ==
Ghalib hailed from the Eidagale clan of the Isaaq clan family. He was a major general in the army of the Somali Republic, and was later appointed the Police Commissioner of the Somali Democratic Republic. Ghalib also held various ministerial and cabinet positions in the government of Somalia, including Secretary of Interior, Minister of Labor and Social Affairs, Minister of Local Government and Rural Development, Minister of Transportation, and Minister of Interior from 1974 to 1984.

Ghalib, a politician from the north who believed in union with Somalia, was briefly detained by Somaliland authorities in August 2003. This resulted in a brief exchange of gunfire.

After his retirement from politics, Jama wrote on Somali history. He taught history, political science and public administration at universities in Mogadisho, including City University, Mogadisho.

During the Ethiopian invasion and occupation of Somalia, Jama served as one of the two vice chairman of the Alliance for the Re-liberation of Somalia, the principal insurgent political opposition.

Ghalib died in Djibouti on 26 April 2022, at the age of 89.

== Books ==
- Somali Phoenix
- The Cost of Dictatorship: The Somali Experience
- Who is a Terrorist? (First & Second Edition 2002 & 2005, respectively).
- Defending History which was published in 2005
- Taariikhda Soomaaliya Xog-ogaalnimo in 2020
