= Ministry of Interior and Federal Affairs (Somalia) =

Government ministry of Somalia

Coordinates: 2°2′24″N 45°20′46″E

- Wasaaradda Arrimaha Gudaha
- Coat of arms of Somalia

Agency overview
- Formed: 1967
- Jurisdiction: Somalia
- Headquarters: Bondhere, Banaadir, Mogadishu
- Agency executive: Ali Yusuf Hosh, Minister of Interior
- Parent agency: Cabinet of Somalia

The Ministry of Interior and Federal Affairs (Somali: Wasaaradda Arrimaha Gudaha Soomaaliya; Arabic: وزارة الداخلية, romanized: Wizārat al-Dākhilīyah) is the interior ministry of Somalia and is the responsible authority for Federal affairs, naturalization and customs in Somalia. It was founded in 1967 after the combined ministerial body covering financial and interior affairs were separated. The first holder was Haji Muse Boqor. current minister is Ali Yusuf Ali Hosh.

== List of ministers ==
- Haji Muse Boqor, 1956–1959
- Abdullahi Issa Mohamud, 1959–1960
- Abdirizak Haji Hussein, 1960–1962
- Mohamoud Abdi Nur, 'Jujo', 1962–1964
- Abdulkadir Mohamed Aden 'Zoppo', 1964–1967
- Yasin Nur Hassan, 1967–1969
- Jama Ali Korshel, 1969–1971
- Hussein Kulmiye Afrah, 1971–1974
- Jama Mohamed Ghalib, 1974–1984
- Ahmed Habib Ahmed, 1984–1985
- Ahmed Soleiman Abadalla, 1985–1987
- Mohamed Abdulle Ba’adle, 1987–1989
- Ahmed Saleeban Dafle, 1989–1990
- Abdulkadir Haji Mohamed, Feb–Sept 1990
- Abdiqasim Salad Hassan, 1990–1991
- Mohamed Qanyare Afrah
- Dahir Sheikh Mohamed
- Arbo Ahmed Gacal
- Hussein Farrah Aidid
- Mohamed Mohamoud Gacma Dhere
- Musa Nur Amin
- Abdulkadir Ali Omar
- Abdishakur Sheikh Hassan
- Abdisamad Moalim Mohamoud
- Abdikarim Hussein Guled
- Abdullahi Godah Barre
- Abdirahman Mohamed Husen
- Abdi Farah Said Juha
- Abdi Mohamoud Sabriye
- Muktar Hussein Afrah
- Ahmed Moalim Fiqi
- Ali Yusuf Hosh — Current
