= Abdulkadir Dheel =

Abdulkadir Dheel عبد القادر ديل
- Died: 3 July 1972 Mogadishu, Somalia
- Allegiance: Somalia
- Branch: Somali National Army
- Rank: Colonel
- Conflicts: Arab Cold War; 1969 Somali coup d'état

Abdulkadir Dheel (Somali: Cabdulqaadir Dheel, Arabic: عبد القادر ديل) (d. 3 July 1972) was a prominent Somali military figure.

== Career ==
A Colonel in the Somali National Army (SNA), Abdulkadir Dheel was among the military officials that were executed by the government on suspicion of involvement in a coup d'état in 1971. Dheel left the army after disagreements with Siad Barre.

In May 1971, Radio Mogadishu announced a plot to overthrow the Siad Barre regime and the subsequent arrest of Deputy Chairman of the Supreme Revolutionary Council General Mohamed Caynaanshe and Defence Minister Lieutenant Colonel Salaad Gebeyre Kediye. Dheel was later arrested and implicated in the coup attempt.

He was executed on 3 July 1972 along with Lieutenant Colonel Salaad Gabeyre Kediye and General Mohamed Ainanshe Guleid. The execution was widely seen as a dark chapter in Somali history given the fact that Dheel was not politically active when the coup attempt took place nor was he affiliated with his erstwhile colleagues. Prior to being executed Dheel was running a pharmacy and was head of the Somali port authority in Merca.

== See also ==
- Mohamed Ainanshe Guleid
- Salaad Gabeyre
- Abdullahi Ahmed Irro
