= Ali Hosh =

Puntland Politician

- Cali Yuusuf Cali Xoosh
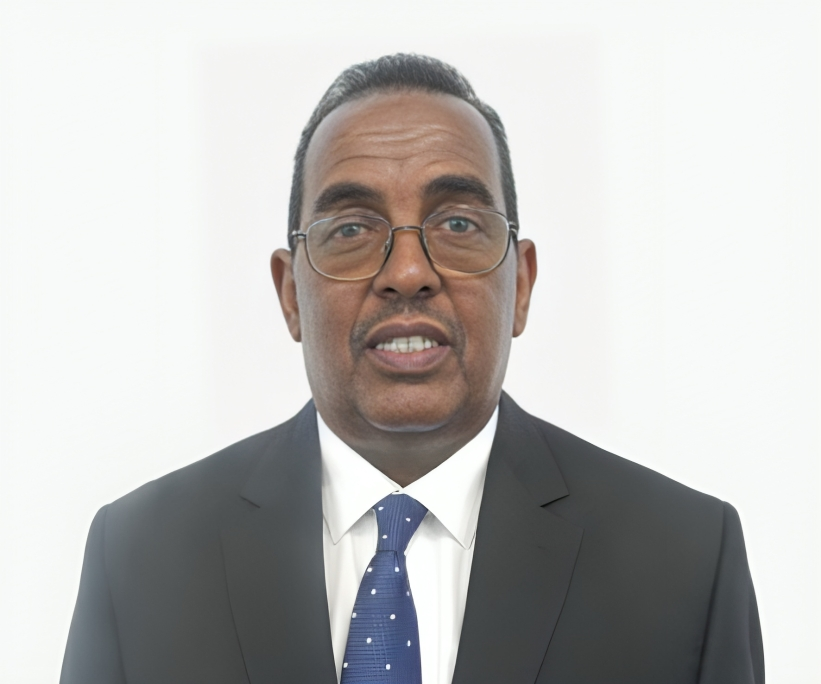

Minister of Interior and Federal Affairs
- Incumbent
- Assumed office April 08, 2024
- Appointed by: Hamza Abdi Barre
- Constituency: Puntland

Personal details
- Born: 1 January 1958 (age 68) Garowe Nugaal, Puntland

Ali Yusuf Ali Hosh (Somali: Cali Yuusuf Cali Xoosh; born January 1, 1958, Arabic: علي يوسف علي حوش) is a Somali politician who has been serving as the Minister of Interior and Federal Reconciliation following his appointment by the Prime Minister of Somalia, Hamza Abdi Barre, on April 8, 2024. Before his ministerial role he was a Member of Parliament representing the Nugal region of Puntland, an autonomous state in northeastern Somalia. Ali Hosh is also known for his role as a member of the Oversight Committee for Review and Implementation of the Provisional Constitution.
