= Abdishakur Sheikh Hassan =

Somali politician

Abdishakur Sheikh Hassan Farah عبدي الشكور الشيخ حسن

Minister of Interior Affairs & National Security of Somalia
- In office 12 November 2010 – 10 June 2011

Personal details
- Died: 10 June 2011 Mogadishu, Somalia
- Party: Transitional Federal Government

Abdishakur Sheikh Hassan Farah (Somali: Cabdishakuur Sheekh Xasan Faarax, Arabic: عبدي الشكور الشيخ حسن) (died 10 June 2011) was a Somali politician. He served as the Minister of Interior Affairs and National Security in the Transitional Federal Government of Somalia.

== Biography ==
On 12 November 2010, Abdishakur Sheikh Hassan Farah was appointed Somalia's Minister for Internal Affairs and Security by Mohamed Abdullahi Mohamed, the nation's new Prime Minister. Part of a leaner, technocratic administration, the Cabinet was widely lauded as a welcome break from previous governments.

On 10 June 2011, he died at Banadir Hospital in Mogadishu from injuries sustained after a suicide bomber had evaded security and entered his home in Mogadishu. The bomber was his teenage niece Haboon Abdulkadir Hersi Qaaf, who had been recruited by the Islamist insurgent group Al-Shabaab.

The office of Prime Minister Mohamed subsequently issued a press release declaring 11 June a national day of mourning in memory of Abdishakur Sheikh Hassan Farah.
