= SIMAD University =

University in Mogadishu, Somalia

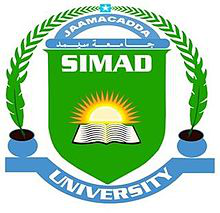
- Logo
- Former names: Simad for Somali Institute of Management and Administration Development
- Motto: The Fountain of Knowledge and Wisdom
- Established: 6 November 1999; 26 years ago
- Founders: Hassan Sheikh Mohamud
- Academic affiliations: Africa Muslims Agency; AAU; FUIWI; IAU; ASU
- Undergraduates: 3800
- Postgraduates: 18
- Location: Jidka Warshaddaha, Mogadishu, Benadir, Somalia
- Language: Somali language
- Colors: Green & blue
- Website: https://simad.edu.so/

SIMAD University (SU) is a private university in Mogadishu, Somalia. It offers undergraduate courses. It is the first private non-profit university teaching in the Somali language.

== History ==
In 1999, SIMAD was established as an institute of higher learning. After 11 years, the board of trustees upgraded the institute to a university on 20 January 2011.

== Governance and management ==
The supreme governance bodies of the university are made up of:

- Board of Trustees
- University Senate
- Academic Council
- Operations Board
- Development Committee

== Faculties ==
The faculties of SIMAD University and the degrees offered are:

- Faculty of Management Sciences
  - Bachelor of Business Administration
  - Bachelor of Banking & Finance
  - Bachelor of Procurement & Logistics
  - Bachelor of Digital Marketing
  - Bachelor of Innovation & Entrepreneurship
- Faculty of Computing
  - Bachelor of Computer Science
  - Bachelor of Information Technology
  - Bachelor of Graphics and Multimedia
- Faculty of Social Sciences
  - Bachelor of Public Administration
  - Bachelor of Developmental Studies
  - Bachelor of Social Work and Administration
  - Bachelor of Media and Communication
  - Bachelor of Political Science & International Relations
- Faculty of Economics
  - Bachelor of Economics
  - Bachelor of Statistics and Planning
  - Bachelor of International Trade and Investment
- Faculty of Law
  - Bachelor of Law (LLB)
- Faculty of Education
  - Bachelor of Science Education (Biology and Chemistry)
  - Bachelor of Science Education Management
  - Bachelor of Science Education (Mathematics and Chemistry)
  - Bachelor of Arts Education (English and Literature)
- Faculty of Engineering
  - Bachelor of Civil Engineering
  - Bachelor of Electrical Engineering
  - Bachelor of Telecommunication Engineering
  - Bachelor of Science in Architecture
- Faculty of Accountancy
  - Bachelor of Accounting
- Faculty of Medicine & Health Sciences
  - Bachelor of Medicine
  - Bachelor of Nursing
  - Bachelor of Microbiology and Laboratory Sciences
  - Bachelor of Public Health
  - Bachelor of Midwifery
  - Bachelor of Radiology

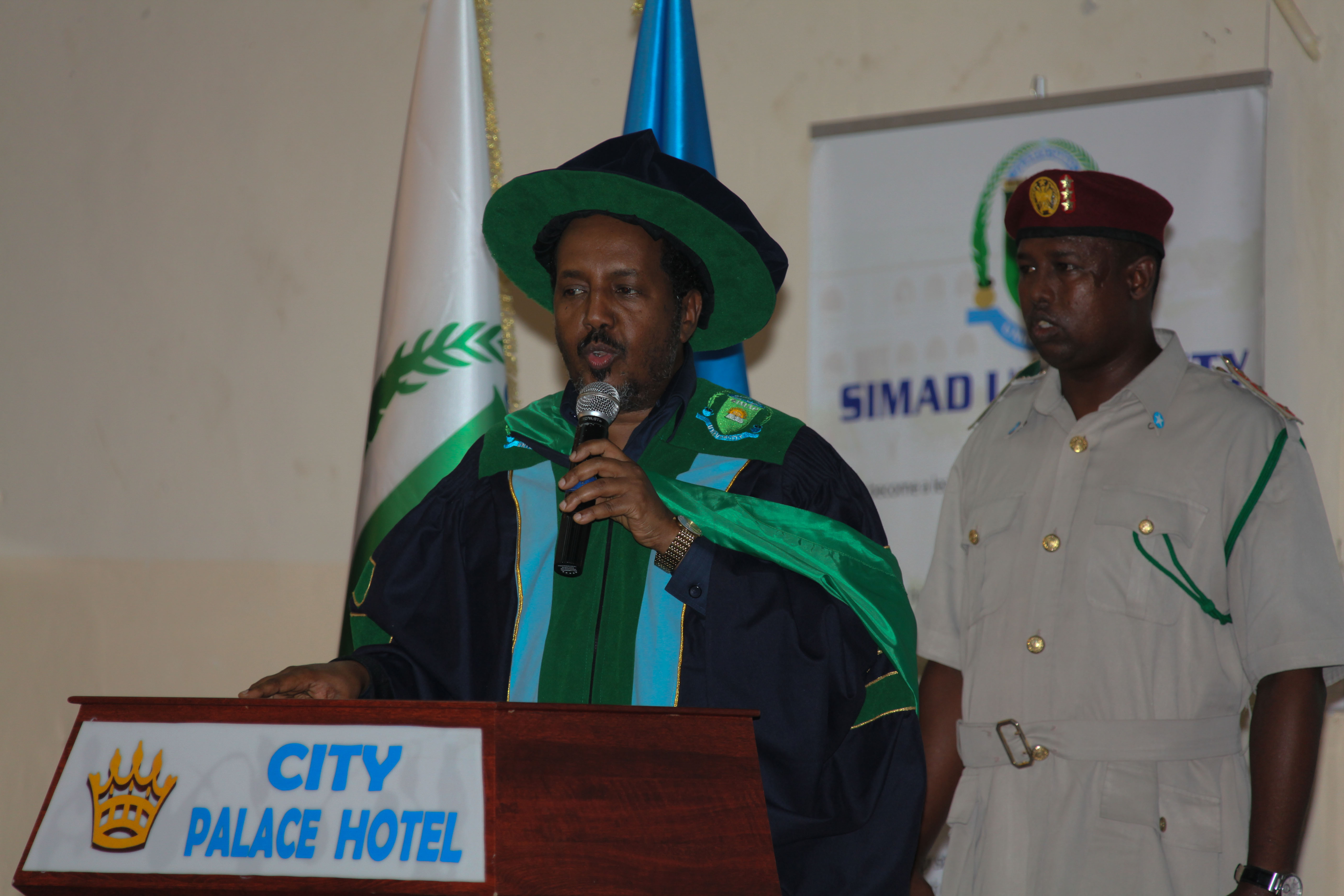
Founder, first rector of SIMAD University. Current president of Somalia Hassan Sheikh Mohamud.

== Memberships ==
- International Association of Schools
- Somali Research and Education Network (SomaliREN)
- Association of African Universities (AAU)
- Arab States Research and Education Network (ASREN)
- ARAB-ACRAO
- World Engagement WEInstitute
- Association of Somali Universities

== Partnerships ==
- Open University Malaysia (OUM), Malaysia
- Shinawatra University, Thailand
- Multimedia University, Malaysia
- International Islamic University, Malaysia
- Sudan University of Science and Technology, Sudan
- Makerere University Business School (MUBS), Uganda
- Daffodil International University, Bangladesh

== Accreditation ==
SIMAD is registered as a private, non-profit higher education institution under the Ministry of Education, Higher Education and Culture (Somalia).

== Notable former and current administrators ==
- Hassan Sheikh Mohamud – current president of the Federal Republic of Somalia; founder and former principal of SIMAD.
- Faarah Sheikh Abdulkadir – Former minister of State House; former lecturer and board member.
- Abdikarim Hussein Guled – Minister of Interior; board member
- Abdurahman Mohamed Hussein (Odowaa), Former minister of internal affairs and federalism of the Federal Republic of Somalia; former rector of SIMAD University.
