= Abdirahman Mohamed Husen =

Somali politician

Abdirahman Mohamed Hussein
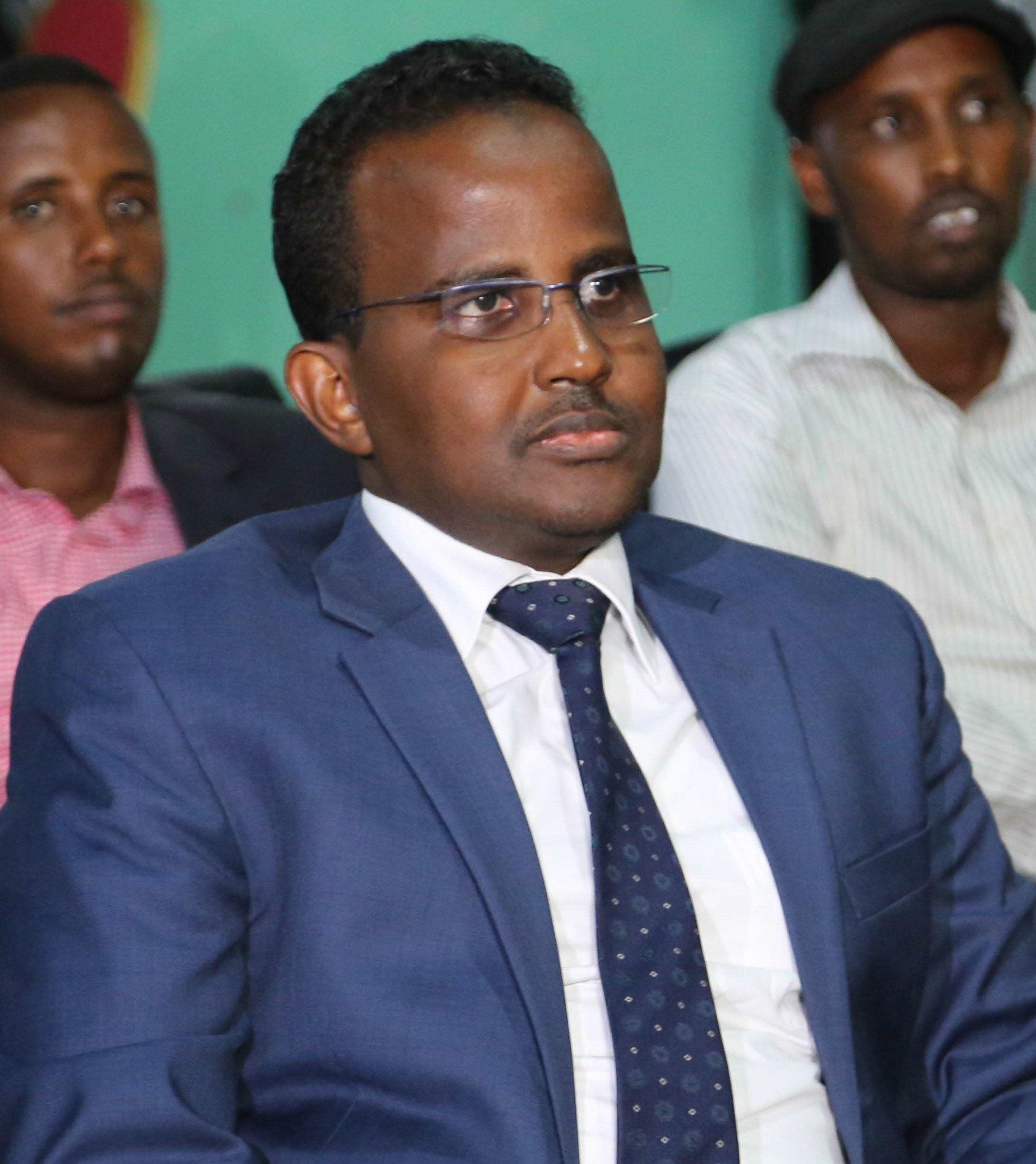
- Abdirahman Mohamed Hussein, 2016

Secretary-General of Union for Peace and Development Party
- Incumbent
- Assumed office 23 May 2020
- Preceded by: Ahmed Moalim Fiqi

Member of Somali Federal Parliament
- Incumbent
- Assumed office 27 December 2016

Minister of Interior and Federal Affairs
- In office 27 January 2015 – 29 March 2017
- President: Hassan Sheikh Mohamud
- Prime Minister: Omar Abdirashid Ali Sharmarke
- Preceded by: Abdullahi Godah Barre
- Succeeded by: Abdi Farah Juxa

President of SIMAD University
- In office 10 January 2011 – 17 January 2015
- Preceded by: Hassan Sheikh Mohamud
- Succeeded by: Dahir Hassan Arab

Personal details
- Born: Mogadishu, Somalia
- Party: Union for Peace and Development Party
- Occupation: Politician

Abdirahman Mohamed Hussein is a Somali politician. Before entering politics, he served as President of SIMAD University. He was the Minister of Interior and Federal Affairs of Somalia, having been appointed to the position on 27 January 2015 by the then Prime Minister Omar Abdirashid Ali Sharmarke. He hails from the Saleeban Habargidir clan. He is a fierce critic of hassan sheikh
