= Jama Ali Korshel =

Somali army Major General

Jaamac Cali Qoorsheell جامع علي قورشيل Jama Ali Korshell
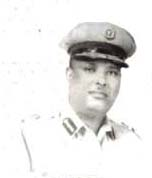

1st First Vice President of Somalia
- In office 25 November 1969 – 21 April 1970
- President: Siad Barre
- Preceded by: Office established
- Succeeded by: Mohamed Ainanshe Guled

Personal details
- Born: Erigavo, British Somaliland
- Died: 1989 London, England
- Children: Said Qorshel

Military service
- Allegiance: British Empire; Somalia
- Branch/service: Somali Police Force
- Years of service: 1950s–1970
- Rank: Major General
- Battles/wars: 1964 Ethiopian-Somali Border War; 1969 Somali coup d'état

Jama Ali Korshel (Somali: Jaamac Cali Qoorsheel, Arabic: جامع علي قورشيل) was a Somali army Major General who served as head of the Somali Police Force. He was the Vice President of Somalia and VP of the Supreme Revolutionary Council. He also served as the Minister of Interior from 1969 to 1971.

== Biography ==
Korshel was born in the town of Erigavo, situated in Sanaag region of Somalia. He was from the Warsangeli clan. Korshel completed the Quran in Erigavo and started school at SOS Sheikh Secondary School to finish his middle school education. The SOS Sheikh Secondary School is situated near the town of Sheikh in a remote part of present-day northern Somalia. Korshel finished his high school studies in Aden, Yemen. After completing high school Korshel went back to northern Somalia and joined the police force. He was given a scholarship to go to the National Police College in Ryton-on-Dunsmore, Warwickshire, England to complete his training.

He was a leader in the Somali National League (SNL) when British Somaliland gained its independence in 1960. Following the establishment of the Somali Republic and the assassination of the young nation's second president, Abdirashid Ali Sharmarke, Korshel would later emerge as one of the key figures in the 1969 Somali coup d'état which saw the military junta of Major General Mohamed Siad Barre take power. He was appointed vice president of Somalia and the VP of the new Supreme Revolutionary Council (SRC) that assumed office, and put in charge of Internal Affairs.

In 1970, an alleged counter-coup d'état attempt, reportedly masterminded by Korshel, was uncovered. Korshel was subsequently arrested in April 1971, until 1975, when he was released from prison. Korshel later embarked on a business career.

He died in 1989 in London, England, and was subsequently flown to Mecca, where a religious ceremony was held in his honor before finally being laid to rest in Mogadishu.

Korshel's son, Said Korshel, would later follow in his father's footsteps, entering politics and serving in the Puntland regional administration as a minister between 2002 and 2007 and the federal Government of Somalia as Minister of Transportation.

== See also ==
- Siad Barre
- Salaad Gabeyre Kediye
- Mohamed Ainanshe Guled
