= Abdullahi Issa =

Somali politician

His Excellency Abdullahi Issa عبد الله عيسى
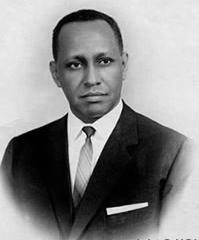

Prime Minister of the Italian territory of Somaliland
- In office 29 February 1949 – 1 July 1960
- Preceded by: Inaugural
- Succeeded by: Muhammad Haji Ibrahim Egal

Personal details
- Born: 1921 Afgooye, Italian Somaliland
- Died: 1988 (aged 66–67) Rome, Italy
- Party: Somali Youth League

Abdullahi Issa Mohamud (Somali: Cabdullaahi Ciise Maxamuud, Arabic: عبد الله عيسى محمد (1921 – March 24, 1988) was a Somali politician. He was the Prime Minister of Italian Somalia during the trusteeship period, serving from February 29, 1949, to July 1, 1960.

== Biography ==
Issa was born in 1921 in the southern town of Afgooye.

Nicknamed "Bidaar", Issa frequented a Somali primary institution in the capital, as well as a local Qur'anic school (madrassah). When the Second World War broke out, he was still a student.

Issa later relocated to the port of Merca at the age of sixteen, where he would work as a postal clerk from 1939 to 1941. He thereafter returned to Mogadishu and assumed a position in the Department of Economic Affairs. Following the British military occupation of Somalia in the early 1940s, Issa was relieved from his duties. He then embarked on a business career.

After the turmoil of the war years, Issa joined the Somali Youth League (SYL) at its onset. He typified the Somali political elite of the period, as he was "young (age 38), intelligent, largely self-educated, confident, and determined". He quickly rose through the ranks to become one of the party's leaders. In 1948, he was appointed to the SYL's central committee, and eventually as its Secretary-General.

Issa later went to Paris and New York as an SYL delegate to proclaim the right of the Somali people to independence. From 1950 to 1954, he represented the SYL at the United Nations Trusteeship Council. After being appointed to office as an SYL deputy in the political elections of 1956, he was called in the same year to form Somalia's first government, thus becoming the nation's first Prime Minister.

Re-elected in 1959, he was re-confirmed as Premier, and held for some time also the portfolios of Foreign Affairs, Interior and Grace and justice. In the government formed after Somalia's independence in July 1960, Issa was later appointed Foreign Minister. In this capacity, he took part in many international conventions, in particular the United Nations General Assembly and the conferences in Addis Abeba, among other cities. With the conclusion of the general election of March 1964, Issa returned to the National Assembly as an SYL deputy for Beledweyne.

A few years later, the Supreme Revolutionary Council (SRC) seized power. The new military government subsequently appointed Issa as Somalia's Ambassador to Sweden in 1974. He held the position until early 1983, when he resigned from public office after a long career in politics.

Issa spent his retirement years in Rome, Italy. He died there in March 1988, and was transported to Mogadishu for burial.

== See also ==
- Mohammed Awale Liban
- Somali Youth League
- Haji Muse Boqor
- Aden Abdullah Osman Daar
- Haji Bashir Ismail Yusuf
- Mohamed Hussein Roble
- Syedomar Afrah

== Notes ==
Political offices
| Preceded by Inaugural Interim Somali Government | Prime Minister of Interim Somali Government Under UN trusteeship 1949 – 1960 | Succeeded by Abdirashid Ali Shermarke |
