= Ahmed Saleeban Dafle =

Somali intelligence officer (1937–2025)

Comrade Brig General Ahmed Hirsi Roble أحمد سليبان دافلي
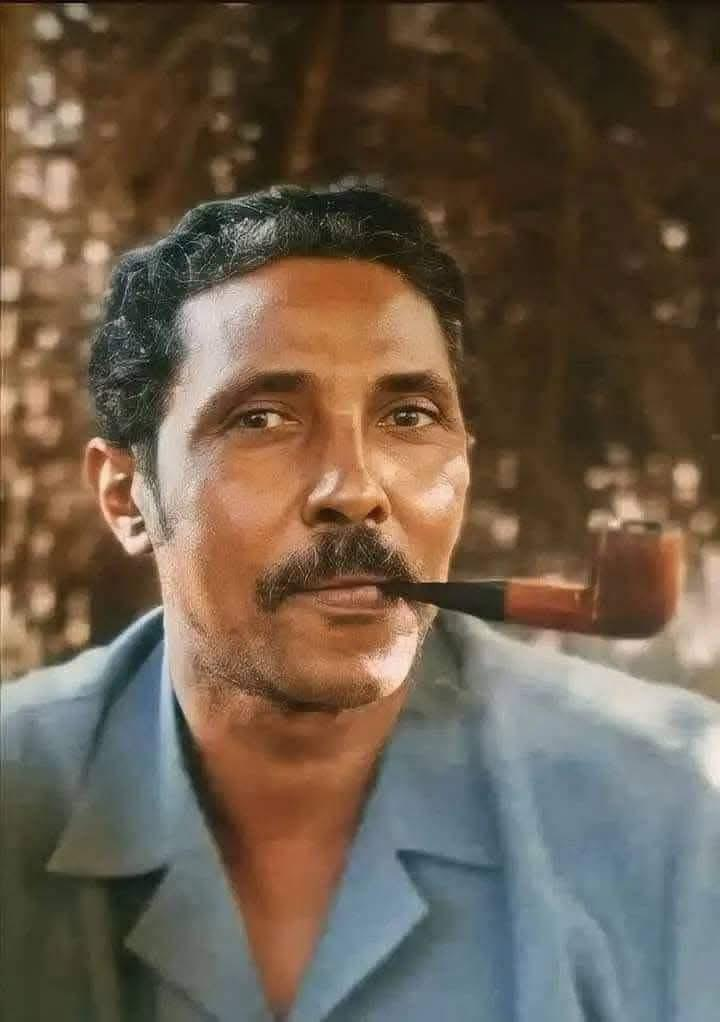

Head of National Secruity Service
- In office 21st October 1969 – 1981
- President: Siad Barre
- Preceded by: Established
- Succeeded by: Mohamed Jibril Muse

3rd Second Vice President of Somalia
- Preceded by: Office Established

Minister of Interior

Personal details
- Born: 1934 Burco, British Somaliland
- Died: 2025 (aged 90–91) Muscat, Oman
- Party: (Somalia) Supreme Revolutionary Council (1969 - 1976); Somali Revolutionary Socialist Party (1976 - 1991)
- Profession: Brig General

Military service
- Branch/service: National Security Service (Somalia)
- Rank: Brig General

Ahmed Saleban Dafle (Somali: Axmed Saleebaan Dafle; Arabic: أحمد سليبان دافلي ) ( Born 1937 – 15 April 2025 ), was a Somali intelligence and security official who served as Head of the National Security Service (NSS) during the Somali Democratic Republic. He was also a senior member of the Supreme Revolutionary Council (SRC), the ruling body that governed Somalia following the 1969 military coup.

Dafle was among the prominent figures within the state security apparatus during the early years of the revolutionary government, playing a role in internal security and intelligence operations under the SRC-led administration.

== Early life ==
Born in Burco, in northern Somalia. He received his early education in Somalia before pursuing military training abroad.

Dafle was later trained at the Royal Military Academy Sandhurst in the United Kingdom, one of the most prestigious military institutions in the world. His training at Sandhurst formed part of a broader cohort of Somali military officers educated overseas during the late colonial and early post-independence period, many of whom went on to occupy senior positions within the future Somali state.

== Career ==
Following the 1969 military coup, he held senior positions within the security and governing structures of the Somali Democratic Republic. He rose through the ranks of the state security apparatus and was appointed Head of the National Security Service (NSS), the country's principal intelligence and internal security body during the revolutionary period.

In this capacity, he oversaw intelligence operations, internal security matters, and the coordination of national security policy. The NSS played a central role in maintaining political order and addressing internal and external security challenges during the early years of the revolutionary government.

He was also a senior member of the Supreme Revolutionary Council (SRC), the governing body that assumed power after the overthrow of the civilian government. As a member of the SRC, he participated in the formulation and implementation of state policy during the consolidation of military rule.

== Personal life ==
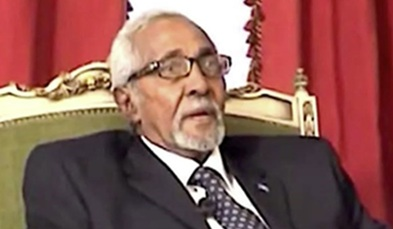

Following the collapse of the Somali state in 1991, he sought refuge in Belgium, where he lived in exile for several years. During this period, he remained largely out of public office but occasionally gave interviews reflecting on Somali political and security affairs during the revolutionary era. In his later years, he resided intermittently outside Europe. He subsequently died in Muscat, Oman
