= Mohamed Ainanshe Guled =

Somali military officer and politician (died 1972)

Mohamed Ainanshe Guled Maxamed Caynaanshe Guuleed
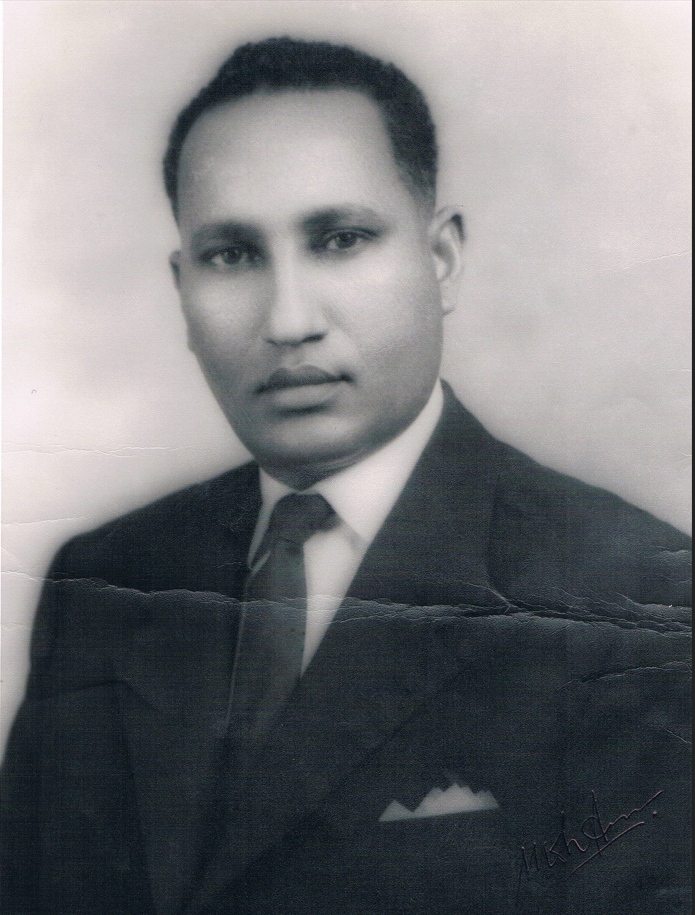

Vice President of Somalia
- In office October 1969 – April 1971
- President: Siad Barre
- Preceded by: Office established
- Succeeded by: Ismail Ali Abokor

Personal details
- Born: Burao, Togdheer, British Somaliland
- Died: 1972 Mogadishu, Somali Democratic Republic
- Party: Somali Revolutionary Socialist Party

Military service
- Allegiance: (Somalia) Somali Republic (1960–1969); (Somalia) Somali Democratic Republic (1969–1971)
- Branch/service: Somali National Army
- Years of service: 1950s–1970
- Rank: Brigadier General
- Battles/wars: 1964 Ethiopian-Somali Border War; 1969 Somali coup d'état

Brigadier General Mohamed Ainanshe Guled (Somali: Maxamed Caynaanshe Guuleed Faarax Caynaanshe) was a Somali military officer and politician who served as the First Vice President of Somalia from 1969 to 1971.

A prominent military figure in Somalia during the 1960s, he led the 1969 Somali coup d'état along with Siad Barre that established Barre's regime and the Somali Democratic Republic. However, his discontent with Barre's rule over the country and power struggle within the latter's government ultimately led to his demise and execution, after he and other officials were accused of plotting to overthrow Siad Barre's regime in 1971.

== Early life and military career ==
Ainanshe was born in the Hawd region in Ethiopia and belonged to the Habr Yunis Rer Ainanshe clan. As a young man he joined the Italian Carabinieri college and graduated in 1952, and served in the colonial police force of the Trust Territory of Somaliland. After the independence of Somalia and the establishment of its military in 1960, he was appointed the commander of the 26th Division of the Somali Army based in Woqooyi Galbeed. Ainanshe is credited for the coining of most Somali Military terms and nomenclature which replaced the Italian and English systems. During his military career, he rose to the rank of Brigadier general serving as the vice-commander and later Chief Of Staff of the Somali Armed Forces, the highest rank within the military.

== Role as Vice President (1969–71) ==
=== China ===
On 16 June 1970, Ainanshe led a Somali delegation to China. He held talks with Chairman of the Chinese Communist Party Mao Zedong and Vice-Premier Li Xiannian. At the conclusion of diplomatic visit on 19 June, in Beijing, the governments of the People's Republic of China and the Somali Democratic Republic signed a preliminary agreement for economic and technical cooperation. Ainanshe gave a lengthy speech at the banquet ceremony. In his speech to the Chinese government he reiterated his nation's support for the Chinese people's right to be members of the United Nations, he also outlined the main motivating factors that impelled the Somali Military to stage the coup, among the reasons he cited were the civilian governments financial corruption and unwillingness to liberate the Somali territories under Ethiopia, Kenya and France.

Excerpt from his speech:

We believe [ in ] and we will tirelessly work for the restoration of the legitimate rights of the People's Republic of China in the United Nations and the expulsion of the illegal Chiang Kai-shek regime. When this objective is realized, the progressive forces in that world body will have gained a weighty ally and friend [...] After independence, the position of Somalia was not different . Power had passed to reactionary regimes whose single purpose was the amassing of wealth. They found a useful ally in the former colonialists and neo- colonialists. The national purposes of economic development and political independence were thrown overboard. National wealth and aid from friendly nations were shamelessly squandered. Prior to the revolution therefore our country was on the verge of bankruptcy. On the social aspect, decadence, loss of purpose and failing morale prevailed while on the political side, our people were divided and confused. The flare up of civic disorder and internal strife was a close probability. It was because of the development of such a serious situation that the armed forces saw it fit to intervene and put an end to this development.

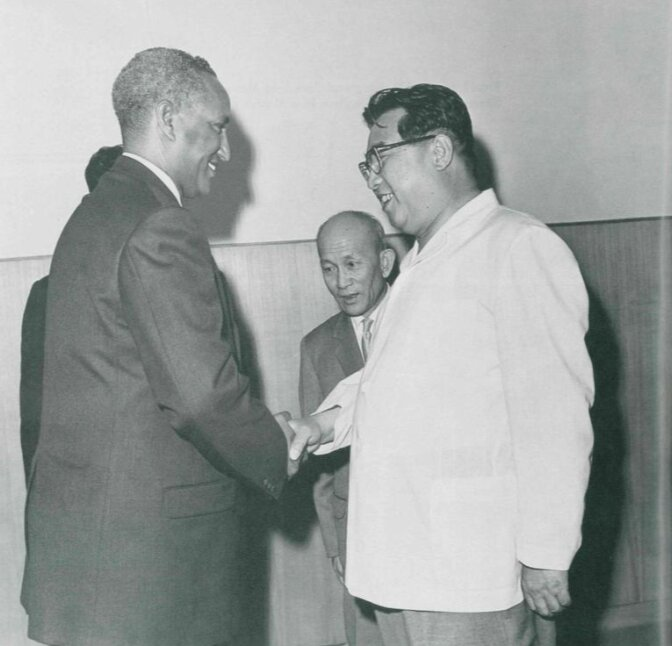
Mohamed Ainanshe Guled in North Korea with Kim Il Sung 1970

Chinese economic assistance to Somalia by 1971 far outpaced that of the Soviet Union. The Somali highway connected the north and south of the country was the Chinese government's second-most ambitious project in Sub-Saharan Africa, which they started and finished in the late 1970s. In addition, the Chinese started building factories and clinics and gave Somalia more sizable loans.

=== North Korea ===
On 13 April 1967, the Democratic People's Republic of Korea and Somalia formally established diplomatic relations. It was during this late 1950s to early 1960s period when North Korea first proclaimed diplomatic autonomy.

Because of their common beliefs and geo-political objectives, North Korea and Somalia had close contacts during that time. In the framework of the larger Cold War, both nations nominally supported anti-imperialism and Marxism–Leninism and sided with the Soviet Union. In 1970, the DPRK and the Supreme Revolutionary Council established diplomatic ties. During his vice presidency, Ainanshe travelled to Pyongyang for the first time in 1970 meeting and having talks with the leader of North Korea Kim Il Sung. Following their meeting, Somalia and North Korea signed a bilateral agreement for technical support and trade.

== Role in the 1969 coup and demise ==
=== 1969 coup d'état ===
While paying a visit to Las Anod in the Northern part of the country, Abdirashid Ali Shermarke, then Somalia's president, was shot dead by one of his bodyguards. Just six days after Sharmarke's assassination, a bloodless military coup d'état led by Mohamed Ainanshe and Siad Barre, overthrew the government and established a military government with Barre assuming as head of state. The Supreme Revolutionary Council (SRC) that assumed power after coup and was led by Ainanshe, Barre, Lieutenant Colonel Salaad Gabeyre Kediye and Chief of Police Jama Korshel. A power struggle eventually ensued at the SRC's leadership partly due to Siad's increasing nepotism and tribalism. In 1971, Ainanshe and Gabeyre Kediye were charged with attempting to overthrow President Barre. Both men were shortly afterwards found guilty for treason and along with Colonel Abdulkadir Dheel, were publicly executed the following year.

== See also ==
- Hassan Adan Wadadid
- Abdulkadir Dheel
- Mohamed Ibrahim Egal
- Salaad Gabeyre Kediye
