= Abdullahi Godah Barre =

Somali politician

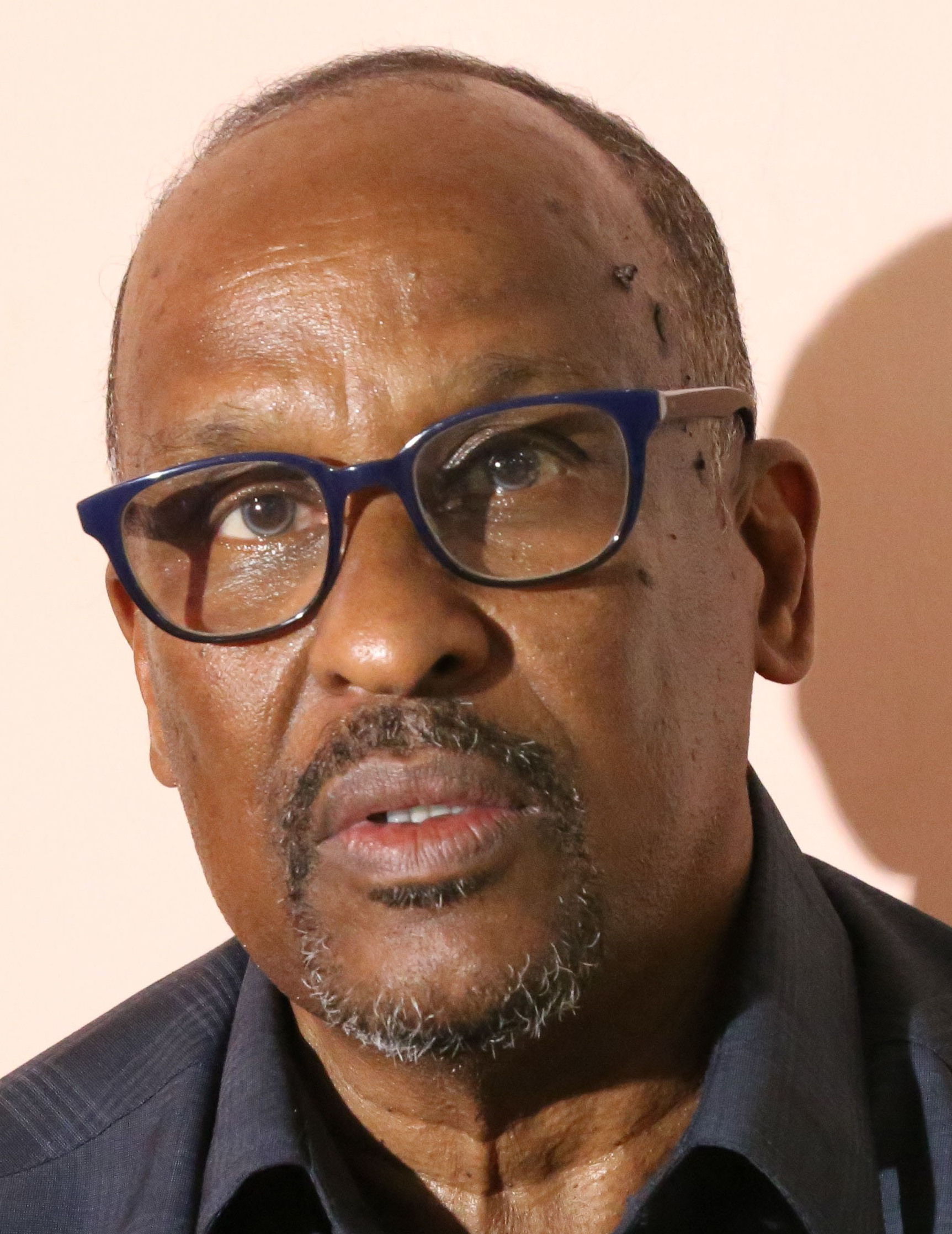

Minister of Education and Higher Education
- In office 17 January 2017 – 20 October 2020
- Prime Minister: Hassan Ali Khaire
- Preceded by: Abdikarim Hussein Guled
- Succeeded by: Abdirahman Mohamed Husen

Minister of Federalism
- In office 12 June 2011 – 12 August 2012
- Prime Minister: Abdiweli Mohamed Ali

Personal details
- Born: Matabaan, Hiran, Somalia, Somali Republic

Abdullahi Godah Barre is a Somali politician and former Member of Parliament in the Federal Parliament of Somalia. He served as Minister of Federal Affairs from 2011 to 2012 under President Sheikh Sharif Sheikh Ahmed, and as Minister of Interior and Federal Affairs from 2014-2015 during President Hassan Sheikh Mohamud’s administration. From 2017 to 2020, he was Minister of Education and Higher Education, where he oversaw national curriculum and education sector reforms. He currently serves as a Senior Advisor in the Ministry of Environment and Climate Change.
