= Ministry of Interior, Federal Affairs and Democratization =

Puntland government Ministry of Interior

- Wasaaradda Arrimaha Gudaha, Federaalka iyo Dimuqraadiyadda

Agency overview
- Formed: 1 August 1998
- Jurisdiction: Government of Puntland
- Minister responsible: Abdi Farah Said Juha
- Website: https://moifad.pl.so/

The Puntland Ministry of Interior Federal Affairs and Democratization MoIFAD (Somali: Wasaaradda Arrimaha Gudaha, Federaalka iyo Dimuqraadiyadda) formerly known as the Puntland Ministry of Interior, Local Governments and Rural Development MoILGR (Somali: Wasaaradda Arrimaha Gudaha, Dawladaha Hoose iyo Horumarinta Reer Miyiga) is the government body responsible for governance and development of Puntland’s communities for the portfolio of municipalities, including district council formation and implementing systems for local governance. The ministry supports service delivery at the local level through political, fiscal and administrative decentralization. Since 2022, it was ministered by Abdi Farah Said Juha.

== Establishment ==
Following the establishment of Puntland in 1998, initially it was formed as the Ministry of Interior and Security Affairs to develop structures and strengthening their capacity with a view to promoting democratic and accountable local administrations that provide better basic services for stability and enhanced peace, and the first minister was Hassan Abshir Farah, later reformed and then labeled Puntland Ministry of Interior, Local Governments and Rural Development (MoILGR). In the 2000s, it was split into the Ministry of Security and DDR.

The ministry was created to improve its capacity by implementing policies and frameworks that support effective governance, community welfare, and local administration across the region. The ministry aims to strengthen the foundations of Puntland’s public administration and foster sustainable development for all citizens.

The Ministry also collaborates closely with local and international partners to promote peace, security, and community resilience. By fostering transparent governance and empowering local administrations, the ministry plays a vital role in building a stable and prosperous future for Puntland.

== List of ministers ==
- Hassan Abshir Farah
- Abdullahi Ahmed Jama
- Ahmed Elmi Osman
- Mohamed Abdirahman Dhabancad
- Abdi Farah Said Juha – incumbent
