= Somali Democratic Republic =

1969–1991 communist state in the Horn of Africa

Somali Democratic Republic: Jamhuuriyadda Dimuqraadiga Soomaaliyeed (Somali); الجمهورية الصومالية الديمقراطية (Arabic); Repubblica Democratica Somala (Italian)
- 1969–1991
- Flag Coat of arms
- Anthem: Soomaaliya Ha Noolaato (Somali) "National anthem of Somalia"
- Somalia in 1970
- Capital: Mogadishu
- Official languages: Somali
- Common languages: Somali; Arabic; Italian
- Religion: Sunni Islam
- Demonym: Somali
- Government: Unitary communist state
- President
  - 1969–1991: Siad Barre^{a}
- Vice President
  - 1976–1991: Mohammad Ali Samatar
- Historical era: Cold War; Arab Cold War
  - Somali coup d'état: 21 October 1969
  - Ogaden War: 13 July 1977
  - 1978 Somali coup attempt: 9 April 1978
  - 1982 Ethiopian–Somali Border War: 1982–1983
  - Somali Civil War: 26 January 1991

Area
  - Total: 637,657 km^{2} (246,201 sq mi) (40th)

Population
  - 1972: 2,941,000
- Currency: Somali shilling (SOS)
- Calling code: 252
- ISO 3166 code: SO
Preceded by	Succeeded by
Somali Republic	Interim Government of Somalia; Somaliland
- Today part of: Somalia; Somaliland^{b}
- 1. Chairman of the Supreme Revolutionary Council from 1969 to 1976 and after 1980.; 2. Somaliland is not internationally recognized, As of 26 December 2025, Israel is the only United Nations member state that recognises the Republic of Somaliland as an independent sovereign state. Somaliland's territory is considered part of Somalia. Somaliland authorities, however, hold de facto power in the region.

The Somali Democratic Republic (SDR) (Somali: Jamhuuriyadda Dimuqraadiga Soomaaliyeed; Arabic: الجمهورية الصومالية الديمقراطية; Italian: Repubblica Democratica Somala) was a communist state with a unitary system of government (Note: Three of these sources additionally clarify about the internal organisation of powers within Somalia at the time. The Constitution made no reference to a system of unified state power: rather, it said, in the classical fashion, that "Legislative power in the Somali Democratic Republic shall exclusively be vested in the People’s Assembly.", and established an independent judiciary with judges that can only be removed for cause.) in Somalia that existed from 1969 to 1991.

Established in October 1969, the Somali Democratic Republic emerged following a coup d'état led by Major General Siad Barre and the Somali military. Barre's administration and the Somali Revolutionary Socialist Party governed Somalia for the next 21 years and was characterised by modernisation efforts, the standardisation of the Somali language, and infrastructural projects.

== History ==
=== Coup d'état ===
Abdirashid Shermarke, the 2nd president of Somalia, was assassinated outside the municipal headquarters of Las Anod in Northern Somalia on 15 October 1969. Shermarke had been visiting drought-stricken areas in the northeast when the assassin, Said Yusuf Ismail, shot and killed him.

Henry Kissinger, then United States National Security Advisor, concluded that the assassin acted independently. Shermarke had been elected in 1964 with support from the Soviet Union and other communist states during his campaign.

On 21 October 1969, at 3:00 a.m., Siad Barre, Jama Ali Korshel, Salaad Gabeyre Kediye, Mohamed Ainanshe Guled, and the military overthrew the parliamentary government of the existing Somali Republic. One of the primary causes of the coup was widespread corruption and mishandling of public funds between the Office of the Prime Minister and the National Assembly; consequently, many members of the police and armed forces became disillusioned with the government.

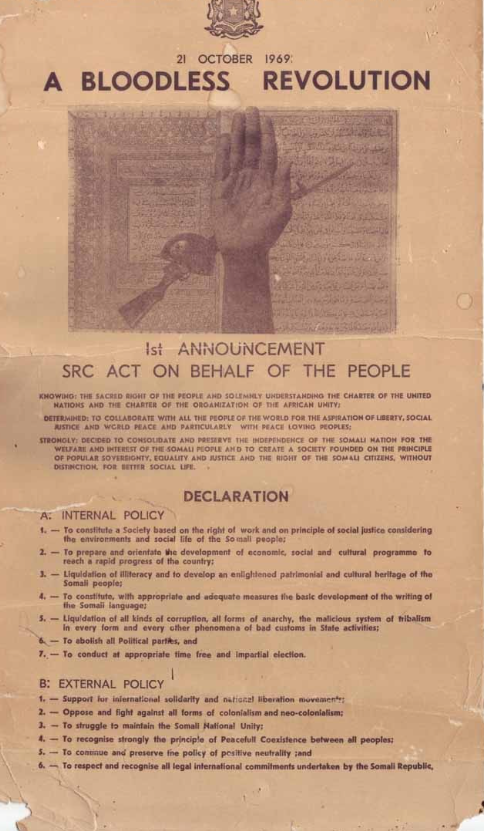
Proclamation of coup by the Supreme Revolutionary Council.

The assassin of former President Abdirashid Shermarke Ismail was tried, tortured, and executed by the Supreme Revolutionary Council. Notably, Ismail shared the same clan background as President Shermarke.

=== Early years ===
In 1970, one year after the coup, Siad Barre declared Somalia to be a communist state and set upon the 'Somalization' of the country, a scheme to diminish clan loyalties and create a 'dutiful Somali' country. The Supreme Revolutionary Council (SRC), which came to power following President Shermarke's assassination, was led by Lieutenant General Salaad Gabeyre Kediye and Chief of Police Jama Ali Korshel. Kediye held the official title of "Father of the Revolution" with Barre as the head of the SRC. The SRC arrested members of the former civilian government, banned political parties, dissolved the National Assembly, and suspended the constitution.

==== Literacy campaign ====
The Somali revolutionary army initiated large-scale public works programs in 1972, and implemented an urban and rural literacy campaign, significantly increasing the literacy rate from 5% pre-campaign to 55% by the mid-1970s. However, exact pre-campaign rates are disputed by scholars as reports were unlikely to include literacy attained through religious education. In 1975 the Somali ministry of education was awarded a UNESCO prize.

Former US ambassador to Somalia praised Somali literacy efforts:

UNESCO reportedly examined this and found that when Somalis closed down the schools for two years and sent everybody to the field with chalk and blackboards and radio receivers, that they did, in a period of five years, go from a 12-16% literacy rate to an 86% literacy rate. The Somalis that I know, having been back four times since retirement, and having the privilege of traveling anywhere in the country, would say it certainly is well over 50%. Exactly how high it is, I have no way of judging. But I think it is one of the most remarkable achievements of any country in Africa.

In addition to a nationalization program for industry and land, the new regime's foreign policy emphasized Somalia's traditional and religious ties with the Arab world, leading to its eventual membership in the Arab League (AL) in 1974. That same year, Barre also served as chairperson of the Organisation of African Unity (OAU), the predecessor of the African Union (AU). Somalia also initially adhered to a populist communist philosophy. Consequently, Barre's regime lent support to various anti-colonial movements, including the rebellion in the Republic of South Africa (RSA) against that country's then-ruling apartheid government. As chairman of the Organisation of African Unity (OAU) in 1974, a rotating seat, Barre invited the African National Congress (ANC) as an equal member and gave them a platform to have their voices heard. Barre's government also trained South African guerillas and gave them access to military hardware and naval assets.

In July 1976, Barre's SRC disbanded and established the Somali Revolutionary Socialist Party (SRSP) as a one-party government based on scientific socialism and Somali-Islamic principles. Barre retained his position as party head. The SRSP aimed to reconcile the official state ideology with the official state religion, emphasizing Islamic principles of social progress, equality, and justice. The government argued that these principles formed the core of scientific socialism, along with a focus on self-sufficiency, public participation, popular control, and direct ownership of the means of production. While the SRSP encouraged limited private investment, the administration's overall direction was proclaimed as socialist.

==== Operations and relations in Africa (Mozambique, Rhodesia, Zambia and Burundi) ====
In the early phase of the SRC following the coup, Siad Barre and his military junta supported various fledgling administrations and anti-colonial movements. In 1974, the Somali government invited trainee pilots and technicians from Burundi for a two-year-long capacity training programme with the Somali Air Force, which at that time was one of the strongest air powers on the continent. Prior to the programme, the Burundi Air Force consisted of only three pilots who had received training in Egypt and France. This number grew to 18 with the help of Somali pilots and instructors.

Barre was also the only head of state to attend Mozambique's independence celebrations. Along with the Soviet Union and Cuba, Barre also sent martial reinforcements to assist the government of Samora Machel against Rhodesian and Portuguese forces. Rhodesian guerrillas in Maputo at the time "bragged to Portuguese correspondents that Somali tanks will be used in future operations against Ian Smith’s forces. In their struggle against the Rhodesians, Zambia appealed to other African countries for military support. On 27 June 1977, President Kenneth David Kaunda speaking to a crowd of Zambians in Lusaka announced that Somalia's armed forces were prepared to aid his country against the Rhodesians. Somali Air Force pilots stood on standby to fly Zambian MiGs in case of a war.

Despite these relations, however, Barre's administration was also one of the few governments on the continent that maintained regular and extensive contacts with South Africa's apartheid regime. The Somali government would grow increasingly closer with the Republic of South Africa (RSA) during the 1980s, as it progressively abandoned its initial communist philosophy. After fallout from the unsuccessful Ogaden War campaign, Mogadishu sought new allies and approached Pretoria for assistance. Barre viewed the South African government as a potential partner on account of the RSA's own military struggle against communist forces. A South African delegation was subsequently hosted in Somalia's capital in May 1984, where the Somali Defense Minister declared that "RSA and Somalia have the same aggressors". Sharing of military intelligence characterized the two administrations' relationship. The South African government also hoped to secure a position as an armaments supplier for the Somali military, with a view toward using Somalia as an entree into the Middle Eastern weapons market.

=== Ogaden War ===
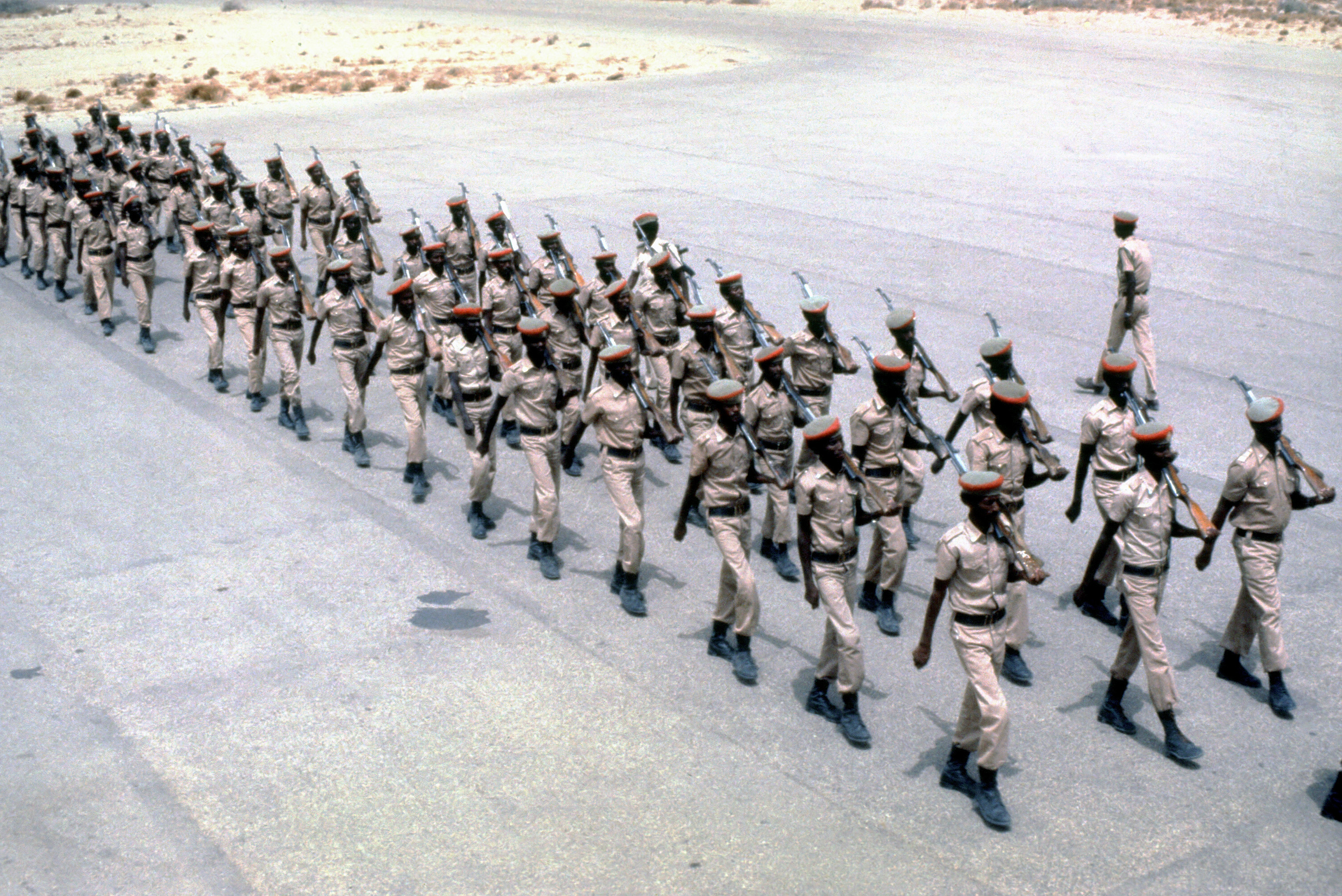
The Somali–Soviet Union friendship and later partnership with the United States enabled Somalia to build the largest mechanised army on the continent.

On 13 July 1977, the Ogaden War against Ethiopia erupted when Barre's government aimed to annex the predominantly Somali-inhabited Ogaden region into a Pan-Somali Greater Somalia. This conflict was part of a broader Somali National Army (SNA) initiative to unify all Somali territories, known as Soomaaliweyn. The USSR, finding itself initially supplying both sides of the war, attempted to mediate a ceasefire. When their efforts failed, all aid to Siad Barre's regime was halted, while arms shipments to Ethiopia were increased citing disapproval of the Somali incursion. Soviet military aid (second in magnitude only to the October 1973 gigantic resupplying of Syrian forces during the Yom Kippur War) and advisors flooded into Ethiopia along with around 15,000 Cuban combat troops. Other communist countries offered assistance: the People's Democratic Republic of Yemen offered military assistance and North Korea helped train a "People's Militia"; East Germany likewise offered training, engineering and support troops. As the scale of communist assistance became clear in November 1977, Somalia broke diplomatic relations with the Eastern Bloc (with the exception of Romania) and expelled all Soviet citizens from the country.

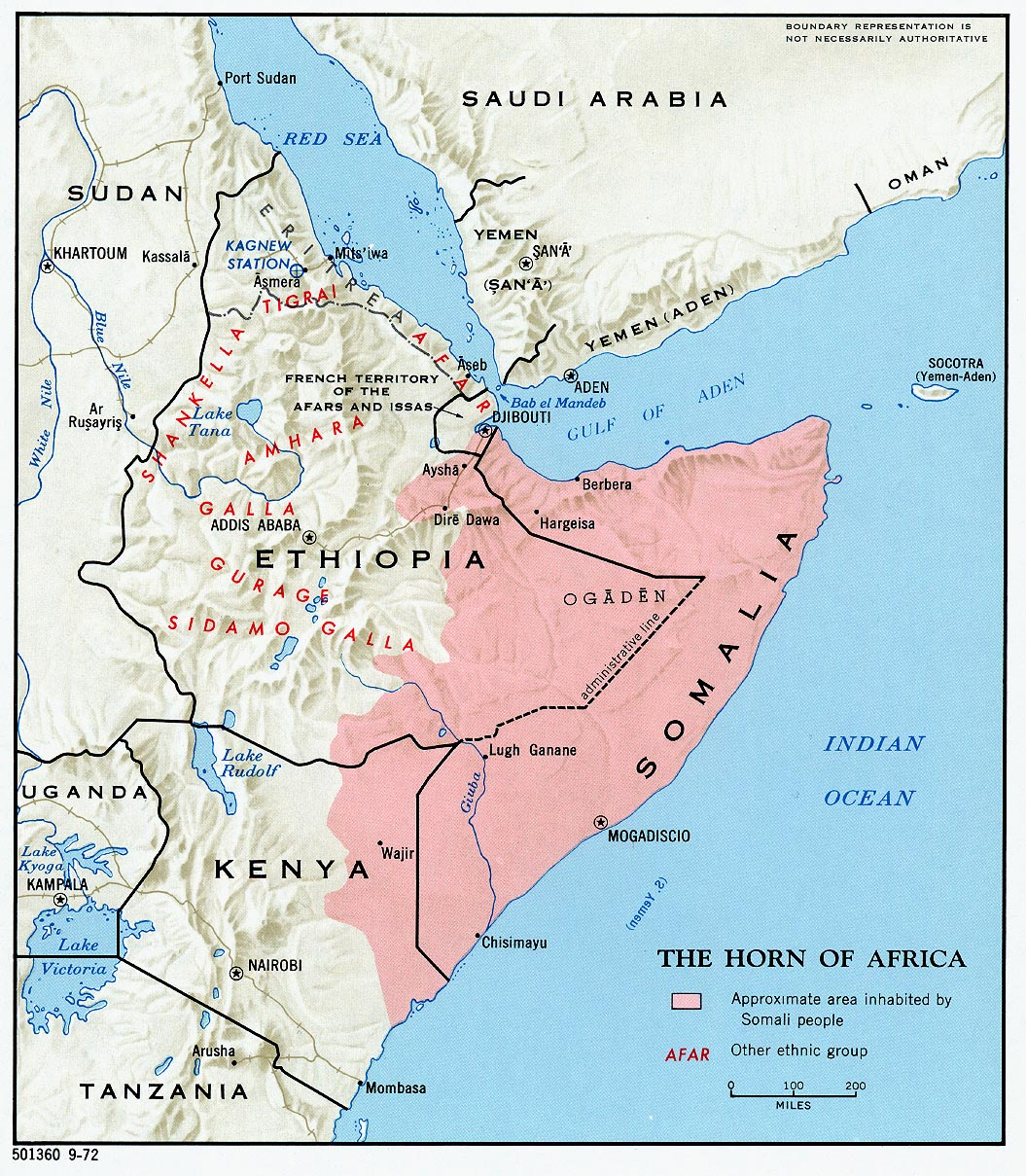
The estimated territory of Greater Somalia.

In the first week of the war, the Somali National Army achieved swift victories over Ethiopian forces, overpowering its military hardware and technological capabilities, as was the case in the Battle of Jijiga in mid-September 1977. This initial success surprised many American military observers who maintained an officially neutral stance. Southern and central Ogaden were quickly captured by the SNA as it continued its advance, making it as far as Sidamo and Bale. By September 1977, Somalia controlled 90% of the Ogaden region, capturing some strategic cities like Jijiga and putting heavy pressure on others like Dire Dawa, the latter of which harbored a key airbase and rail route to the Red Sea.

By 17 August, elements of the Somali army had reached the outskirts of the strategic city of Dire Dawa in an effort to sabotage Ethiopia's war efforts by striking at its crop exports and critical equipment imports. The SNA advanced with two motorized brigades, one tank battalion and one BM battery towards the city against Ethiopian forces consisting of the Ethiopian Second Militia Division, the 201 Nebelbal battalion, 781 battalion of the 78th Brigade, the 4th Mechanized Company, and a tank platoon possessing two tanks. Following the siege of Harar the Soviets launched a large intervention force, made up of 20,000 Cuban troops and several thousand Soviet advisers supporting Ethiopia's communist Derg regime. On 15 March 1978, a ceasefire was negotiated, bringing an end to the war. This shift in Soviet support prompted the Barre government to seek new allies, eventually turning to the United States, which had been courting Somalia to counter Soviet influence. Ultimately, Somalia's initial alliance with the Soviet Union and subsequent partnership with the United States enabled it to build the largest army in Africa.

=== Coup attempt ===
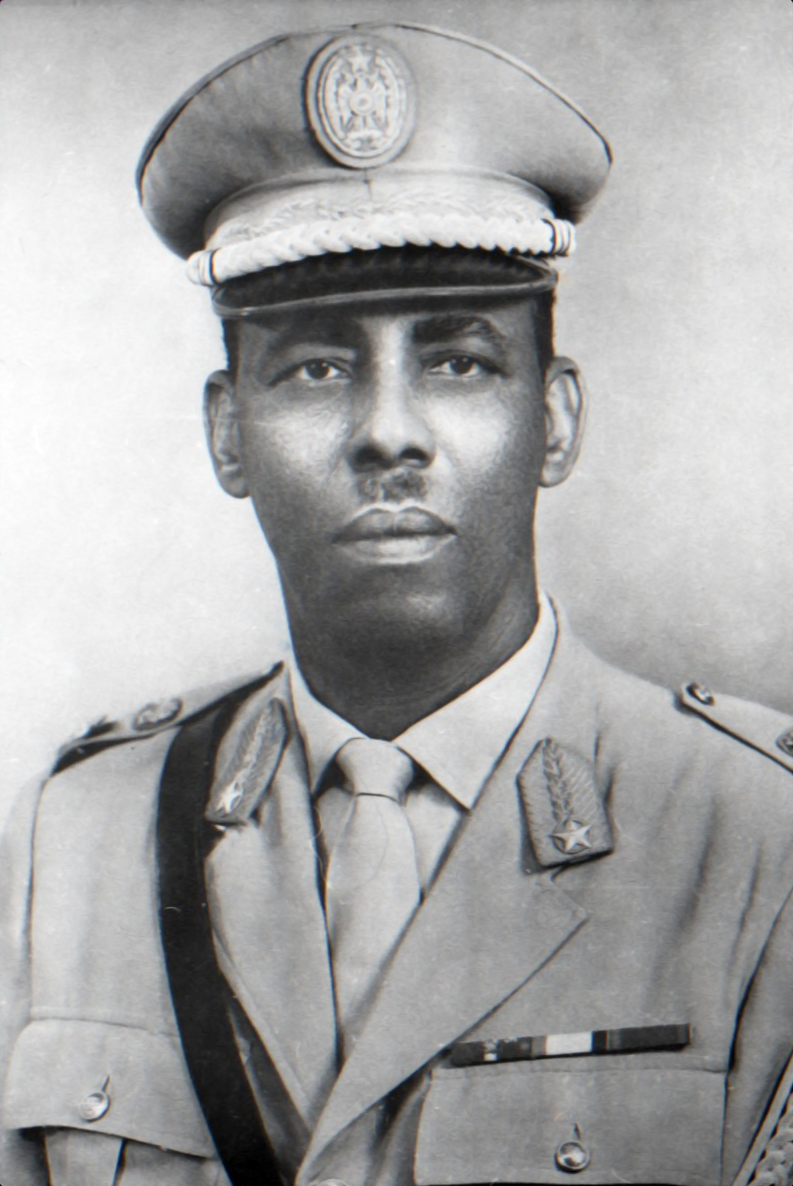
Portrait of Somali president Siad Barre around the year 1970.

On 9 April 1978 a coup was attempted against the Somali government of President Siad Barre. The United States Central Intelligence Agency estimated that the coup, led by former Colonel Mohamed Osman Irro, alongside him Lieutenant Colonel Abdullahi Yusuf Ahmed who both served in the Ogaden war, involved around 24 officers, 2,000 soldiers, and 65 tanks.

The coup was originally planned to start in Hargeisa, a city in northern Somalia, but Barre likely knew of the attempt in advance and was able to disrupt the coup before it launched, as well as position forces loyal to himself in the capital. The attempted coup was unsuccessful; 17 alleged ringleaders were summarily executed by firing squad, and Abdullahi Yusuf fled to the neighboring country of Ethiopia, which was considered an enemy by the Somali government. Barre used the coup as justification to purge officials from the same clan as the plotters.

==== Aftermath ====
After fleeing Somalia, Abdullahi Yusuf and his men would find an armed anti-Siad Barre militia backed by the Derg regime in Ethiopia, 'created, organized, trained and financed by Ethiopia'. Initially called the Somali Salvation Front (SSF; later the Somali Salvation Democratic Front, SSDF), which would soon oppose the Somali government. Barre blamed the coup attempt on the Eastern Bloc, namely the Soviet Union and Cuba, countries that supported Ethiopia in the Ogaden War, he labeled them "new imperialists". The CIA determined that the Soviet Union was not behind the coup attempt, but were ultimately seeking to remove Barre from rule.

=== 1982 Ethiopian–Somali Border War ===
Between June and August 1982, the Ethiopian military, supported by hundreds of SSDF rebels led by Abdullahi Yusuf invaded central Somalia. After a SNA force infiltrated the Ogaden, it joined up with the WSLF and attacked an Ethiopian army unit outside Shilabo, about 150 kilometers northwest of Beledweyne. Ethiopia retaliated by launching an operation against Somalia.

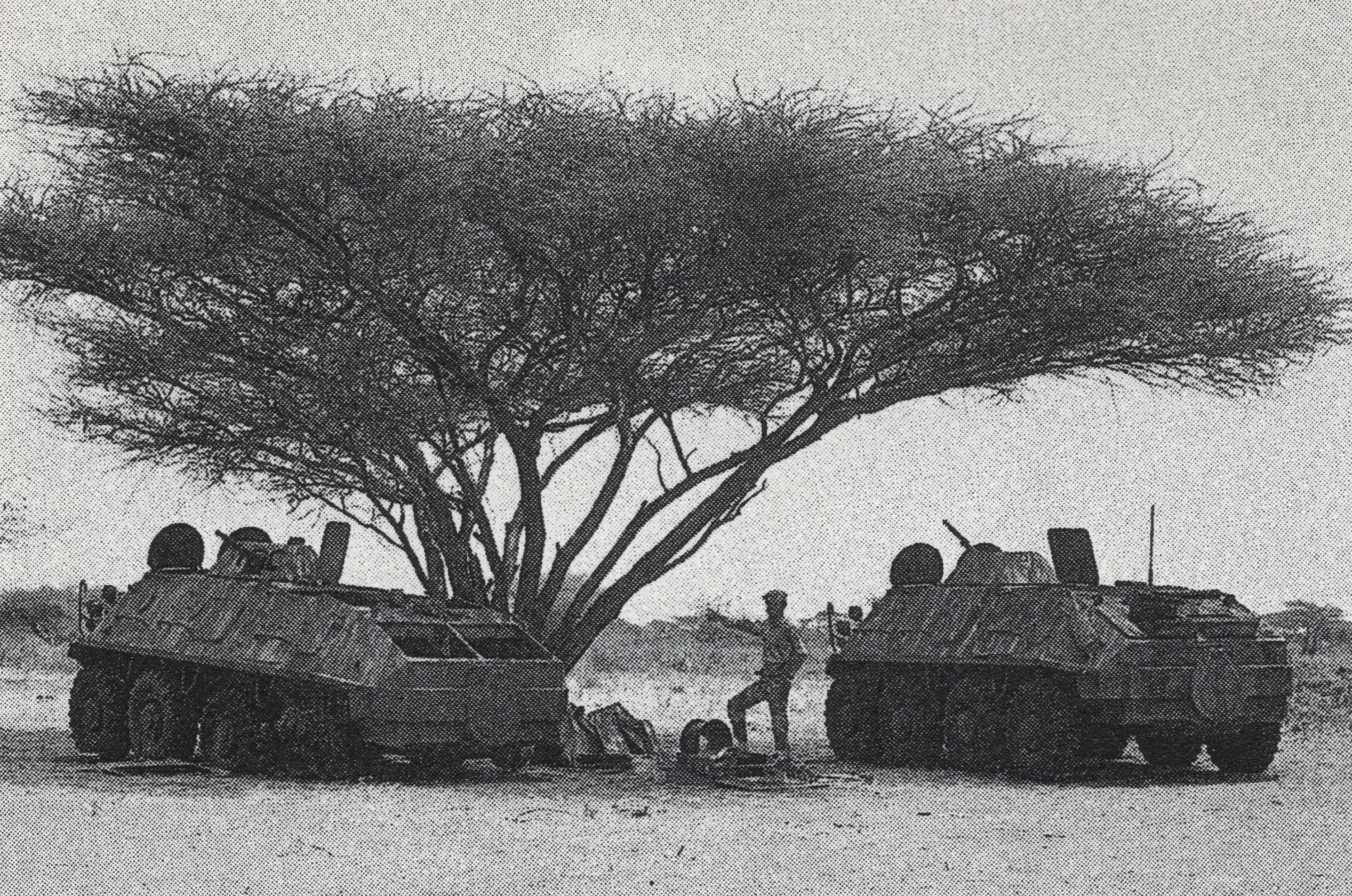
Somali National Army soldier stands between two captured Ethiopian BTR-60 armored carriers that were disabled in battle.

On 30 June 1982, Ethiopian army units, together with SSDF guerrillas, struck at several points along Ethiopia's southern border with Somalia, the operation initially aimed to advance all the way to the Somali coastline and ultimately overthrow the Barre regime. This ended in a stalemate at the border towns of Galdogob and Balanbale about 50 kilometers northwest of Galcaio. Further Ethiopian attacks were repulsed by the SNA even after Ethiopia aligned with the SSDF rebels who had the larger army with approximately 10,000 to 15,000 Ethiopian troops, equipped with Soviet-supplied MIG fighters and T-55 tanks and were accompanied by 2,000 to 5,000 Somali Salvation Democratic Front (SSDF) rebels, who were similarly armed with tanks and received support from Ethiopian artillery and air forces. Ethiopian troops and SSDF rebels failed to capture the key cities of Galkayo and Beledweyne, as the Somali army successfully repelled the main assault. These accomplishments paired with Barre's own political efforts created an upsurge in domestic support for him during the war.

=== Collapse ===
In 1979, a new constitution was introduced, leading to elections for a People's Assembly. Despite this, Barre's Somali Revolutionary Socialist Party (SRSP) continued to maintain control. In October 1980, the SRSP was disbanded, and the Supreme Revolutionary Council was re-established in its place. The regime continued to weaken in the 1980s as the Cold War drew to a close, diminishing Somalia's strategic importance.

The government's totalitarian grip reached its peak during the Isaaq genocide (1987–1989) in response to the attacks against the Somali government by militant groups during the 1970 Zeila uprising (led by Mohamed Farah Dalmar Yusuf, subsequent key member of the SNM) and later bombings within the city of Hargeisa by the Somali National Movement (SNM) a militant rebel organization backed by Ethiopia of predominantly Isaaq supporters. Civilian death estimates range from 50,000 to 200,000. Groups opposed to Barre's regime predominantly supported by Ethiopia, emerged across the country and mounting tensions led to the breakout of the Somali Civil War. Among these militia groups were the Somali Salvation Democratic Front (SSDF), the United Somali Congress (USC), the Somali National Movement (SNM), and the Somali Patriotic Movement (SPM), alongside non-violent political opposition such as the Somali Democratic Movement (SDM), the Somali Democratic Alliance (SDA) and the Somali Manifesto Group (SMG). On 26 January 1991, Barre was ousted from power leaving behind a power vacuum between opposition groups in its wake.

== New constitution ==
A new Constitution was ratified on 25 August 1979 through a popular referendum, leading to elections for a People's Assembly. This Constitution established a presidential system, wherein the president served as both the head of state and the head of government. As head of government, the president appointed the members of the Council of Ministers, which he chaired. Initially, the Constitution stipulated that the president would be elected for a six-year renewable term by a two-thirds majority vote of the legislature.

== Government ==
Upon its establishment, the Somali Democratic Republic declared itself a communist state under the rule of the Supreme Revolutionary Council, and then the Somali Revolutionary Socialist Party. The only serving president, Siad Barre, exercised totalitarian control over the country through a military dictatorship.

=== President ===
- Mohamed Siyaad Barre (21 October 1969 – 26 January 1991)

=== Prime Ministers ===
- Mohamed Farah Salad (1 November 1969 – March 1970)
- Post abolished (March 1970 – 1 February 1987)
- Muhammad Ali Samatar (1 February 1987 – 3 September 1990)
- Muhammad Hawadle Madar (3 September 1990 – 24 January 1991)
