= Abdi Farah Said Juha =

Puntland politician

Abdi Farah Said (Juxa)
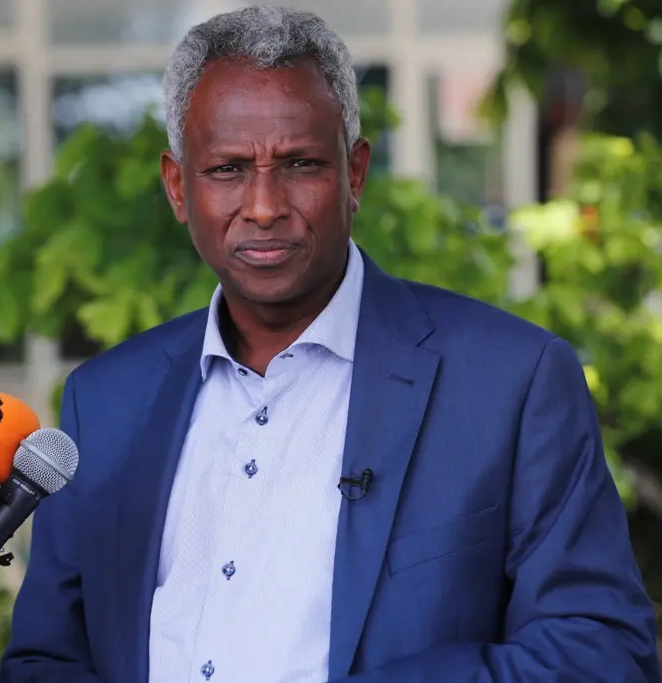
- Wasiir Juxaa in 2017

Somali Minister of Interior and Federal Affairs
- In office 29 March 2017 – 4 January 2018
- President: Mohamed Abdullahi Mohamed
- Prime Minister: Hassan Ali Khaire
- Preceded by: Abdirahman Mohamed Husen
- Succeeded by: Abdi Mohamed (Sabriye)

Minister of Education of Puntland
- In office 1 February 2009 – 1 January 2014
- President: Abdirahman Farole
- Vice President: Abdisamad Ali Shire
- Succeeded by: Ali Haji Warsame

Puntland Minister of Interior Affairs
- Incumbent
- Assumed office 28 September 2022

Personal details
- Born: 4 April 1965 (age 61) Garowe, Nugal, Puntland, Somalia
- Party: Independent
- Children: 5
- Education: Charles University
- Occupation: Politician

Abdi Farah Saed Juxa is a Puntish novelist, poet and politician currently serving as the Puntland minister of interior. He previously served as Puntland's minister of education. On 21 March 2017, he was appointed as Somalia's Minister of Interior and Federal Affairs by Prime Minister Hassan Ali Khaire. Juxaa has been served Puntland Minister of Interior Affairs since 28 September 2022.

Juxa has authored one novel and several short stories and poems.
