= 1969 Somali coup d'état =

Military takeover by General Siad Barre

- Part of the Arab Cold War
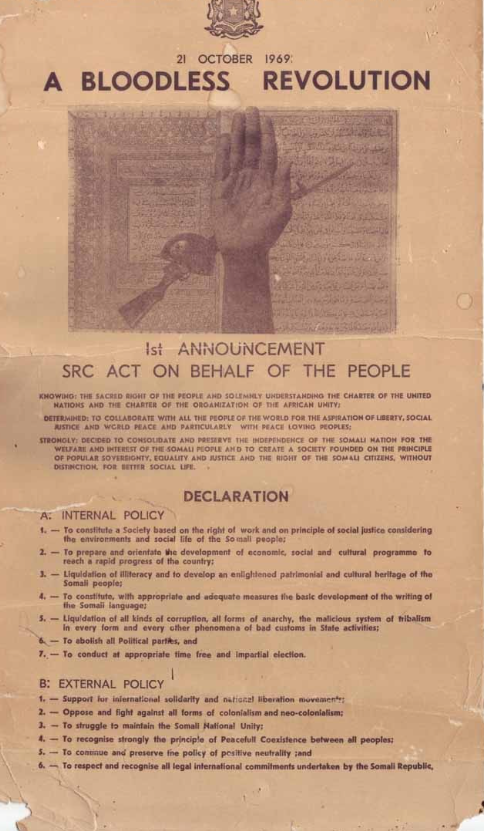
- Proclamation of coup by the Supreme Revolutionary Council
Date	21 October 1969
Location	Mogadishu, Somalia
Result	Supreme Revolutionary Council victory: Somali Republic deposed; Siad Barre installed as president; Somali Democratic Republic established

Belligerents
(Somalia) Somali Republic	(Somalia) Supreme Revolutionary Council

Commanders and leaders
Sheikh Mukhtar Mohamed Hussein; Mohammad Egal (POW)	Muhammad Siad Barre; Jama Ali Korshel; Salaad Gabeyre Kediye; Mohamed Ainanshe Guled

The 1969 Somali coup d'état was a bloodless military takeover of the Somali Republic on 21 October 1969, led by Somali National Army officers of the Supreme Revolutionary Council under General Siad Barre. After the assassination of President Abdirashid Shermarke in Las Anod, the Somali National Army under Barre's command stormed Mogadishu, seized key government buildings, and demanded the resignation of the country's leaders. The coup deposed acting President Sheikh Mukhtar Hussein and Prime Minister Mohammad Egal, ushering in a 21-year military rule under Barre and the establishment of an authoritarian government that lasted until 1991.

The coup arose from the political tensions and highly contested parliamentary elections of March 1969. It was the first successful coup, following a failed attempt in 1961. With the establishment of Supreme Revolutionary Council rule, the Somali Republic was replaced by the socialist Somali Democratic Republic, which governed until its collapse in 1991.

== Background ==
Somalia became independent in 1960, creating the Somali Republic from former Italian Somaliland and former British Somaliland. The first leaders of the new republic were President Aden Abdullah Osman Daar who served as head of state and Prime Minister Abdirashid Sharmarke of the Somali Youth League. Because Somalia was composed of two recently unified territories, the country was divided in many aspects such as taxation, policing, legal systems, and administration, however these differences were largely resolved in a 1961 referendum on a new constitution which saw more than 90% of voters approve the document. The constitution which merged Italian and British colonial institutions established a parliamentary democracy and was intended to create a single national identity.

Despite the ratification of a new constitution, Somalia remained deeply divided among ethnic, political, and clan lines. In 1961, a rebellion by British trained junior army officers in northern Somalia took place however it was quelled, resulting in one officer being killed. The country's first legislative elections were held in 1964, and the Somali Youth League won 69 out of 123 seats in the National Assembly. The rest of the seats in the parliament were split between 11 parties. In 1967, Abdirashid Ali Shermarke, the Italian educated prime minister and member of the Somali Youth League (SYL), was elected as president of Somalia.

In March 1969 another legislative election was held with 64 parties in the running with the SYL being the only political party to have candidates in every election district. The number of political parties was typical of Somalia due to the wide array of differing clans and ethnic groups and the fact that the prerequisite to running was simply clan sponsorship or the support of 500 voters. The election was highly contentious and saw the Somali Youth League gain an even greater majority in the parliament. Allegations of electoral fraud and corruption were rampant and more than 25 people were killed in election-related violence. A general perception grew among Somalis that the SYL was becoming increasingly authoritarian in its rule. This view was compounded by the newly formed government under Prime Minister Egal largely ignoring allegations of fraud and corruption.

Major General Siad Barre, a former Italian colonial police officer and member of the Darod clan, was the commander of the Somali army, and an ardent Marxist and nationalist. He emerged as the leader of the Supreme Revolutionary Council, a group of Somali military and police officers ranging in rank from major general to captain.

== Coup ==
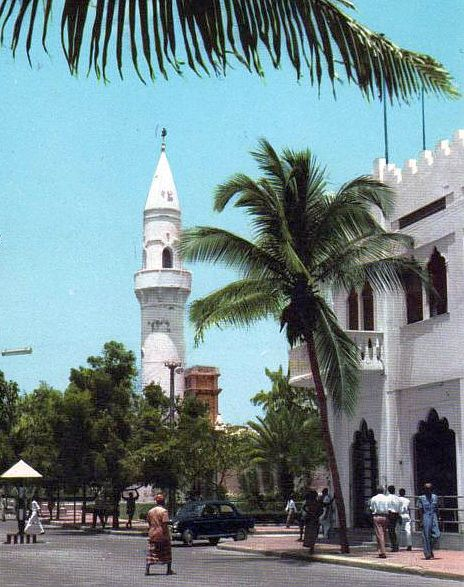
Mogadishu city center in 1963.

On 15 October 1969, President Abdirashid Ali Sharmarke, only Somalia's second president of the postcolonial era, was shot dead by his bodyguard using an automatic rifle as he stepped out of a car in the northern city of Las Anod. He was succeeded by interim President Sheikh Mukhtar Mohamed Hussein. The coup was set in motion the day after Sharmarke's funeral.

The coup d'état took place during the early morning hours of 21 October 1969. Troops of the Somali National Armed Forces supported by tanks and commanded by various members of the Supreme Revolutionary Council sealed off several strategic sites in Mogadishu, including the parliament building, information ministry, Radio Mogadishu, police headquarters, and the mansion of Prime Minister Egal. Major government officials were abducted and imprisoned. Several former senior Somali politicians were rounded up during the coup as well, among them former President Aden Adde and former Prime Minister Abdirizak Haji Hussein. Both were placed in detention and were not released until 1973. Prime Minister Egal too was imprisoned, but in solitary confinement. Despite the seizure of police buildings in the coup, the police did not resist the military and even cooperated with them. Jama Ali Korshel, the head of the Somali Police Force was appointed vice chairman of the Supreme Revolutionary Council.

After military forces seized Radio Mogadishu, the station began broadcasting martial music as a way of conveying the motives of the coup leaders, including the song "Either doomsday death or victory of life," which invoked images of several wild animals such as lions and horses. In his first speech on the radio during the coup, Barre condemned the "corruption" of the old regime and disparaged the oppression of the educated. He also explained that although the government he had overthrown was inept and corrupt not all of its members were criminals, perhaps acknowledging that he had been a part of the very system he had just overthrown. Barre's Supreme Revolutionary Council dissolved the parliament and the Supreme Court, and suspended the constitution.

In 1970, one year after the coup, Siad Barre declared Somalia to be a socialist state and set upon the 'Somalization' of the country, essentially a grand scheme to diminish clan loyalties and create a 'dutiful Somali' country.

== Aftermath ==
The 25-member Supreme Revolutionary Council, in essence a military junta, took over all the duties of the state after the coup, including the presidency, National Assembly, and Council of Ministers. The country was renamed the Somali Democratic Republic and a political purge took place; political parties were banned, former Prime Minister Egal and several other politicians were sentenced to lengthy prison sentences, and dissidents were persecuted. A power struggle in the ranks of the SRC, took place with Siad Barre eventually rising to become Somalia's leader. Salaad Gabeyre Kediye, who had been called the "Father of the Revolution", and Abdulkadir Dheel, a high-ranking army colonel were executed in public by firing squad in 1972.

Barre, called the "Victorious Leader", began leading the country in the direction of scientific socialism and sought to create a shared national identity in Somalia by decreasing the role and influence of the country's various clans. Nomads were resettled into agricultural communes, a large literacy campaign was undertaken, women were granted more rights, and the Latin script was officially adopted for use in the Somali language. Military spending increased with the help of the Soviet Union which provided large volumes of equipment and trainers, and soon Somalia possessed one of the most powerful military forces in Africa. Barre cultivated a cult of personality throughout his 21 years of rule, seeking inspiration from his idols, Kim Il-sung and Gamal Abdel Nasser.

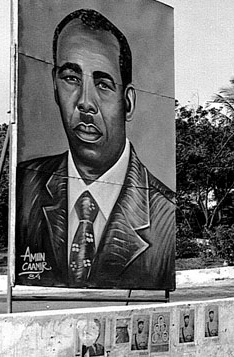
Poster of Siad Barre in Mogadishu.

The SRC was dissolved in 1976 and Barre became increasingly totalitarian with human rights abuses becoming endemic in Somalia. The United Nations Development Programme wrote in 2001, "the 21-year regime of Siyad Barre had one of the worst human rights records in Africa," with the Barre regime persecuting and torturing suspected political dissidents for decades.

== Allegations of Soviet involvement ==
Though no official evidence has been presented to support this theory, suspicions of Soviet involvement in the coup have been widespread since the takeover was carried out in 1969. At the time, postcolonial Somalia had been receiving large volumes of military support from the Soviet Union including vehicles, small arms, and technical assistance in the form of advisers. In addition, thousands of Somali military officers had been sent to the Soviet Union for training in the country's military academies and the Soviet Union maintained a sizable naval base in the country. However, after the coup the Soviets remained wary of the new regime and seemed unsure of the junta's preferred political direction. It is known that the KGB's station in Mogadishu was notified in advance of the coup and some of the plotters were Soviet informants.

Salaad Gabeyre Kediye, one of the coup's main architects who was executed in 1972, was a KGB informant codenamed "OPERATOR", according to documents from the Mitrokhin Archive and the writings of Cambridge historian Christopher Andrew.
