= Salaad Gabeyre Kediye =

Somali senior military official and revolutionary

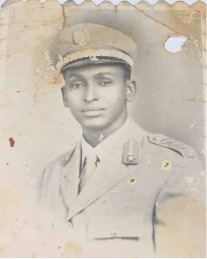
- Born: 1933; Harardhere, Italian Somalia
- Died: 3 July 1972 (aged 38–39); Mogadishu, Somalia
- Cause of death: Execution by firing squad
- Alma mater: Frunze Military Academy
- Military career
- Allegiance: Somalia
- Branch: Somali National Army
- Service years: 1956–1972
- Rank: Brigadier General
- Commands: General Operations Commander
- Conflicts: 1964 Ethiopian-Somali Border War
- Awards: 1964 Medal of Valor
- Other work: Minister of Defence of Somalia 1970.

Salaad Gabeyre Kediye (Somali: Salaad Gabeyre Kediye, 1933 – 3 July 1972), also known as Salaad Gaveire Kedie, was a Somali senior military official who was executed by the Siad Barre regime.

== Biography ==
Kediye was born in Harardhere, Somalia, at the time an Italian colony. A career army man, he received military training at the Frunze Military Academy in Moscow (Военная академия им М. В. Фрунзе), an elite Soviet institution reserved for the most qualified officers of the Warsaw Pact armies and their allies. He later rose to the rank of General in the Somali National Army (SNA).

Salad Gabayre was also the son in-law of President Aden Abdulle Osman and played a key role in the early years of the Army, working alongside General Daud Abdulle Hirsi in selecting and training the future batch of many famous and decorated members of the Armed forces who still serve the country decades later.

On October 15, 1969, while paying a visit to the northern town of Las Anod, Somalia's then President Abdirashid Ali Shermarke was shot dead by one of his own bodyguards. His assassination was quickly followed by a military coup d'état on October 21, 1969 (the day after his funeral), in which the SNA seized power without encountering armed opposition — essentially a bloodless takeover. The putsch was spearheaded by Major General Mohamed Siad Barre, who at the time commanded the army.

Alongside Barre, the Supreme Revolutionary Council (SRC) that assumed power after President Sharmarke's assassination was claimed to be led by Chief of Police Jama Korshel. General Kediye officially held the title of "Father of the Revolution," and Barre shortly afterwards became the head of the SRC. The SRC subsequently renamed the country the Somali Democratic Republic, arrested members of the former civilian government, banned political parties, dissolved the parliament and the Supreme Court, and suspended the constitution. He was appointed Minister of Defence from 1970 , 1971Minister of Public Works

== See also ==
- Muhammad Ali Samatar
- Abdullahi Yusuf Ahmed
- Abdirizak Mohamud Abubakar
- Muse Hassan Sheikh Sayid Abdulle
- Mohamed Farrah Aidid
- Ali Matan Hashi
