= Hahi =

Town in Togdheer region, Somaliland

Hahi Xaaxi حاحي
- Town
- Location in Somaliland Hahi (Somaliland)
- Coordinates: 09°21′7″N 44°57′51″E
- Country: Somaliland
- Region: Togdheer
- District: Oodweyne District
- Elevation: 1,008 m (3,307 ft)

Population (2006)
  - Total: 2,971
- Time zone: UTC+3 (EAT)
- Climate: BWh

Hahi (Somali: Xaaxi, Arabic: حاحي), is a town in Oodweyne District located in western Togdheer, Somaliland.

== History ==
Hahi started as a permanent well for pastoralists and became a settlement. In the 19th century, members of the Sufi order Dandarawiyah would establish a tariqa and jama'a (congregation) at the town. The order was founded by Sayid Mohamed al Dandarawi who was a student of Ibrahim al Rashid and their teachings spread from Arabia to Sudan before eventually reaching Somaliland via the Somali Sheikh Sayid Aadan Ahmed. It spread to Sheikh, remaining much smaller than the established Qadiriyya or Salihiyya orders. Nur Ahmed studied in the tariqa of Hahi before a succession crisis caused him to leave; he later took the title of Habr Yunis and Reer cali part of arab sub-clan Sultan.

== Demographics ==
In June 2006 Hahi had an estimated population of 2,971. Hahi is inhabited by Reer Elmi (also known as Reer Cilmi), a subdivision of the Habaryoonis clan, which belongs to the Garxajis sub-clan of the larger Isaaq clan family.
