= Nur Ahmed Aman =

Sultan Nur Ahmed Aman سلطان نور أحمد أمان
- 3rd Sultan of the Habr Yunis Sultanate
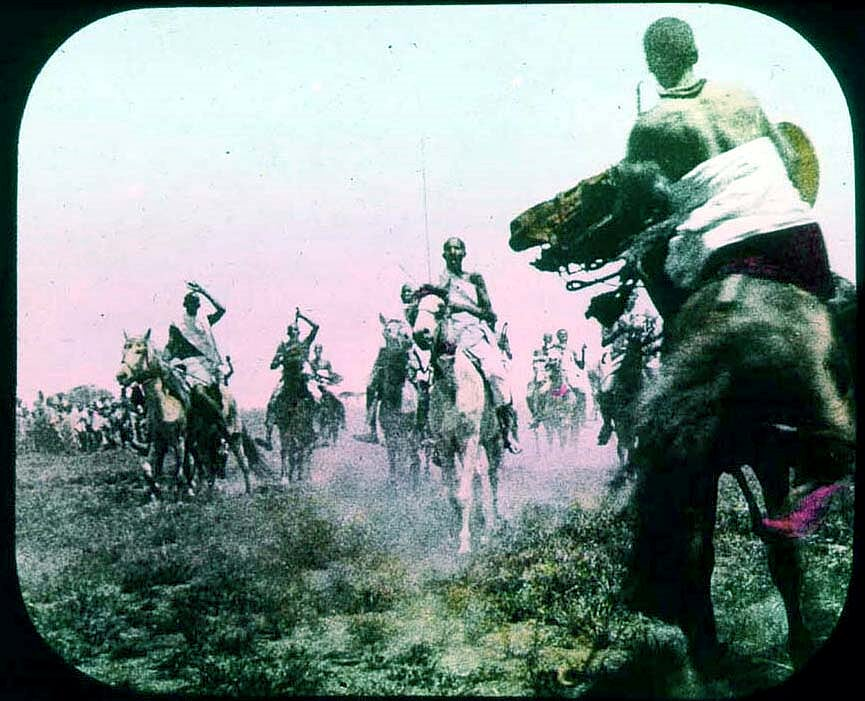
- Sultan Nur (centre) in the Tuuyo plains (1896)
- Reign: 1879-1907
- Predecessor: Hersi Aman
- Successor: Dolal Nur, Awad Deria
- Born: 1841; Oodweyne, Habr Yunis Sultanate
- Died: 1907 (aged 65–66); Taleh, British Somaliland (now Somaliland)
- House: Ainanshe
- Religion: Sufi Islam

Sultan Nur Ahmed Aman (Somali: Suldaan Nuur Axmed Amaan; (1841–1907); Somali nickname Nuur Dheere), was a learned religious leader and the 5th Sultan of the Habr Yunis Sultanate and later also one of the leaders behind the Somali Dervish movement and revolt (1899–1920).

He was the principal agitator rallying the followers of the Kob Fardod Tariqa behind his anti- French Roman Catholic Mission campaign that would become the cause of the Dervish uprising. He assisted in assembling men and arms and hosted the revolting tribesmen in his quarter at Burao in August 1899, declaring the Dervish rebellion. He fought and led the war throughout the years 1899–1904. He and his brother Geleh Ahmed (Kila Ahmed) were the main signatories of the Dervish peace treaty with the British, Ethiopians and Italian colonial powers on March 5, 1905, known as the Ilig Treaty or the Pestalozza agreement. Sultan Nur is entombed in a white-domed shrine in Taleh, the location of the largest Dervish forts and the capital of the Dervish from 1912 to 1920, a testimony to his contribution in creating the movement.

== Biography ==
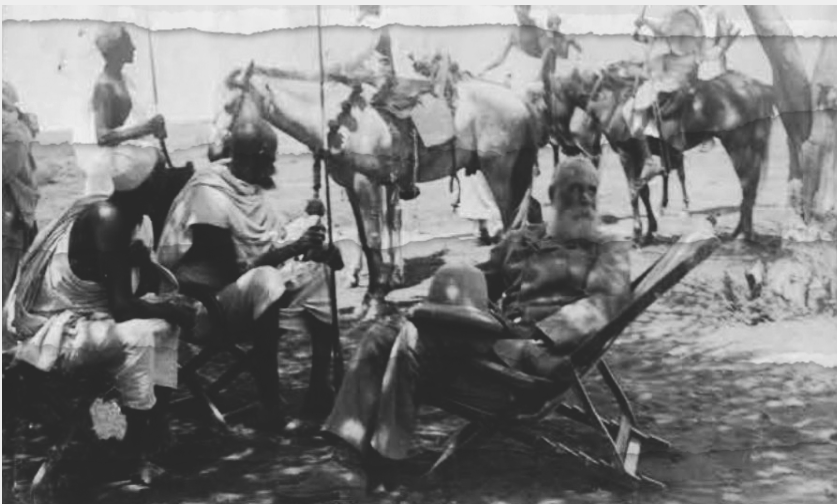
Sultan Nur and Brother Gale, 1896

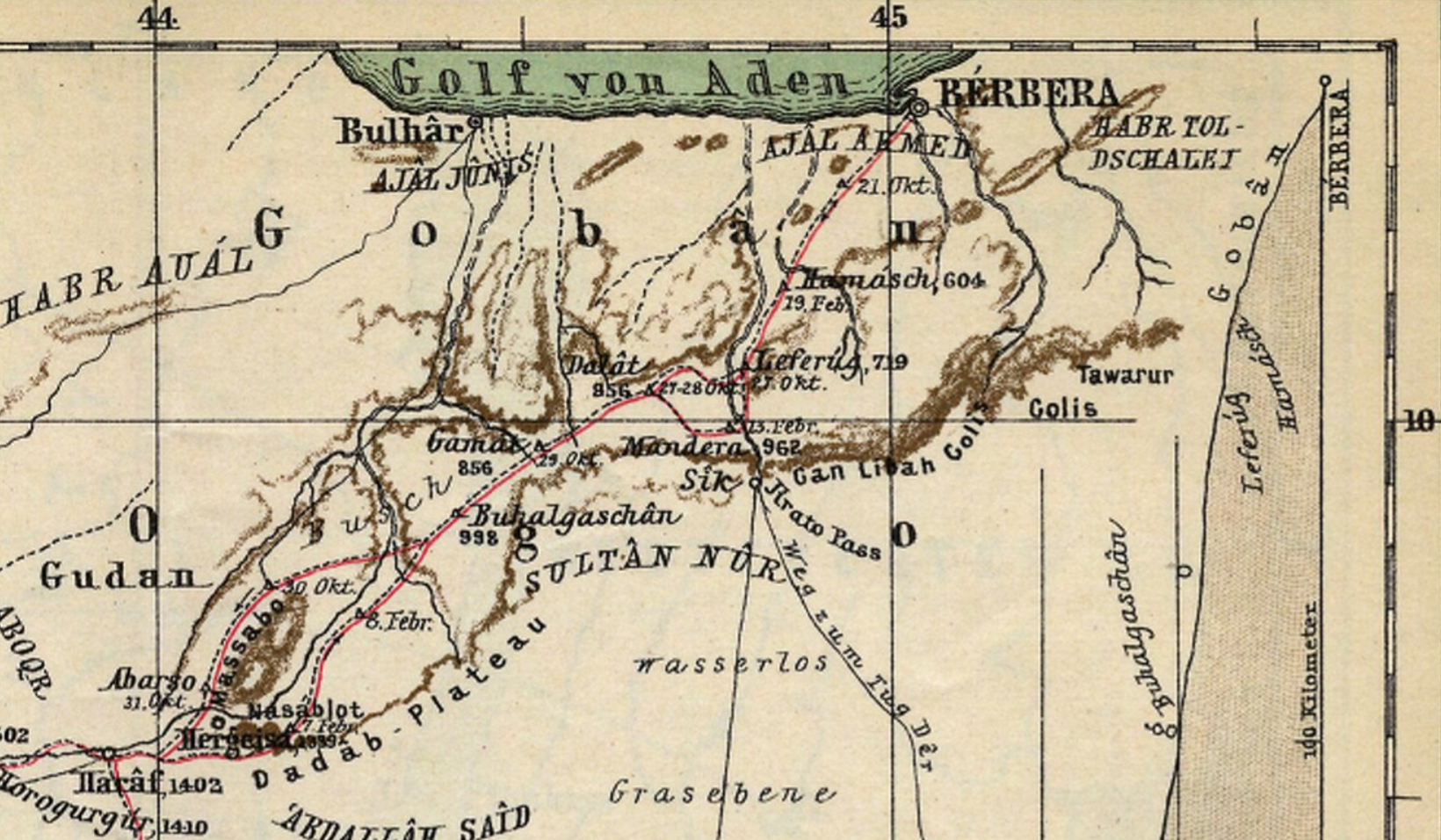
1896 German map showing Sultan Nur's domain in Togdheer

Sultan Nur was the direct paternal descendant of the 18th century Habr Yunis chieftain Ainanshe Hersi and great-grandson of Deria Sugulle Ainanshe who became the paramount Habr Yunis sultan in 1836. He spent much of his early life before his sultanate as a religious Sufi pupil in Hahi and Berato's Ahmadiyya tariqa (known in Somali regions as Ahmadiyya not to be confused with the Ahmadiyya of Mirza Ghulam Ahmad an Ismaili Shia sect). The Ahmadiyya or properly known as the Idrisiyya tariqa was founded by Ahmad ibn Idris al-Fasi (1760–1837). During Nur's years in the Berato tariqa, the head mullah was one Mohamed Arab. and the head mullah of Hahi tariqa was Haji Musa. According to the wife of Sultan Nur, an Aden-born Somali, Nur could not read or write but he could converse in Arabic. However, according to Hayes Sadler's correspondence, Nur could read and write Arabic.

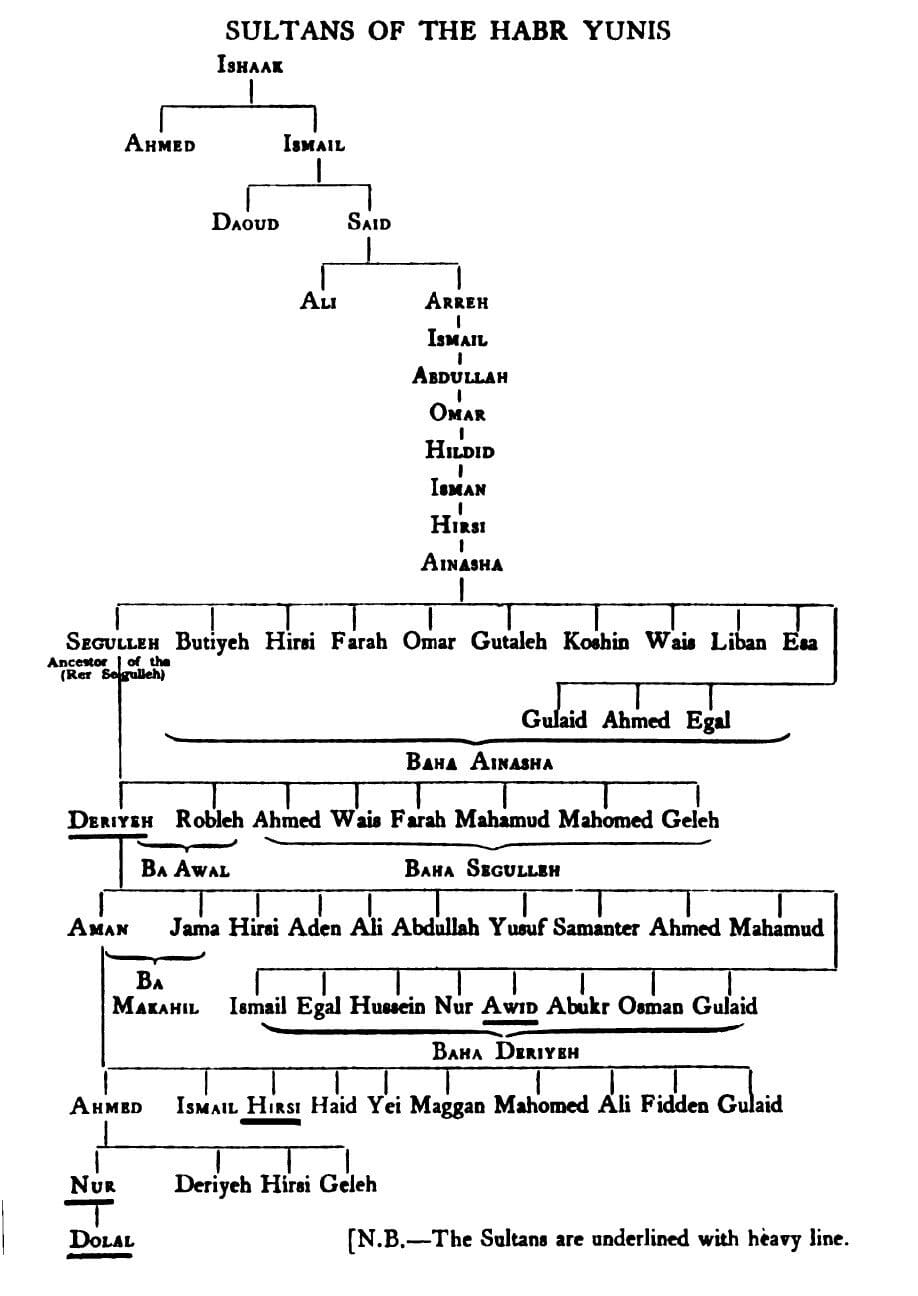
Sultan Nur's genealogy

Nur became a sultan after the death of his uncle, Sultan Hersi Aman (Hersi Aman Sultan Deriyeh Segulleh) (1824–1879), in an intertribal fight. Sultan Hersi, the chief of the Habr Yunis clan since the mid-1850s was killed in an inter-clan war with the sage Haji Guled (Guled Haji Ahmed Segulleh) in 1879, a wise legendary elder who led the Habr Yunis clan, also an uncle of Sultan Hersi. This inter-clan war generated much poetry, celebrated poets emerged during the war, for instance the poems of a young teenager Jama Amuume Jama the mute, a seventeen-year-old who lost two brothers in the war, who later avenged his brothers by killing one Warsame the culprit. One poem of Jama the mute was recorded by the Italian explorer Luigi Robecchi Bricchetti in 1884. There was another poem by a lamenting woman who lost her brother and father in the war, probably the oldest Somali poem on record authored by a woman. Both poems were published in the late nineteenth century.

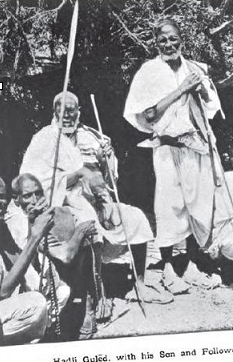
Haji Guled 1906.

The ascent of Nur to the sultanate caused a decade-long civil war when his great uncle Awad Sultan Deriyeh and eldest living son of Sultan Deriyeh declared himself a rival sultan in 1881. Drake Brockman a medical doctor in the Somaliland protectorate and the author of British Somaliland narrated the long conflict caused by Nur's ascent to the sultanate in his book

Drake Brockman summarised Nur's story in 1911:

Deriyeh, the head of the Rer Segulleh, was universally proclaimed Sultan by the rest of the Habr Yunis tribe, and was really the first of the Habr Yunis Sultans, although his father, Segulleh, had tried to pose as such. Sultan Deriyeh lived to a great age, and had no less than eighteen sons, of whom the first two were borne to him by a woman of the Makahil section of the Habr Awal tribe, and the elder of these, Aman by name, joining with his brother, formed the Ba Maka-hil, while his remaining sixteen stepbrothers formed the Baha Deriyeh. Aman had ten sons, the eldest of whom was Ahmed, who died before his father, who himself died before his old father, the aged Sultan Deriyeh. Now, as soon as Sultan Deriyeh died there was trouble as to his successor. The Ba Makahil claimed that Ismail and Hirsi, of their section, were entitled to the honour; but the Rer Segulleh and some of the Baha Deriyeh, said, "No, as several of the late Sultan's sons are still living, one of them should be their Sultan before any of the grandsons"; so they invited Awid Deriyeh to be their representative. In the meantime, Ismail was killed fighting with the Ogaden and Hirsi by the Baha Segulleh. The Ba Makahil now had to look for another successor, so they sent for Nur, the son of Ahmed Aman, and nephew to Ismail and Hirsi, who was living the life of a Mullah at Hahi, near Odweina. Nur, much against his will, consented to be their Sultan, although he preferred the life he was leading as a Mullah. For some years now there were two Sultans of the Habr Yunis, namely, Sultan Nur of the Habr Yunis, Ba Makahil, and Sultan Awd Deriyeh of the Baha Segulleh; so it will be seen the powerful section of the Baha Segulleh had gone to the Baha Deriyeh for their representative". Awad Deriyeh was killed in a fight with the Ogaden Rer Ali, so the Baha Segulleh had to find another Sultan. Accordingly, they chose his brother Hirsi's son, Mattar; but this choice the Baha Deriyeh were not at all pleased with, so all the Habr Yunis tribe decided to meet and discuss the matter out and decide on one Sultan. After a great deal of discussion the two clans, Ba Makahil and Baha Deriyeh, who had claimants for the sultanate, decided to let them toss for it, the winner to be proclaimed Sultan, while the loser got one hundred camels as compensation from the winner. Sultan Nur won, and was proclaimed Sultan of the Habr Yunis tribe.

Nur's ascent to the sultanate in the early 1880s coincided with the Mahdi uprising (1881–1885) Muhammad Ahmad. Various Mahdi and Senussi emissaries visited the Somali coast rallying the population behind their respective Sufi branches. According to Walsh, the British resident counsel at the Somali coast, these two Sufi sects and their followers occasionally collided in Berbera. Nur welcomed the Senousi emissaries and they were regular visitors to his hamlet according to Walsh. Beyond a few minor encounters with the British at the coast in 1886 and 1892, nothing major occurred. in 1890-1891 Awad Sultan Deriyeh was killed in an Ogaden raid and his nephew Mattar Hersi (Mattar Hersi Sultan Deriyeh) was chosen as a rival sultan by some sections within the Segulleh dynasty, the traditional holders of Habr Yunis sultanate. In February 1899, rival Sultan Madar/Mattar Hersi, after having assisted in recovering raided livestock for the mullahs from Kob Fardod, received support for his sultanate from the religious settlement and Mohammed Abdullah Hassan began to champion Mattar's cause.

Upon a visit to the Habr Je'lo they recited this geeraar praising the Sultan. This poem was recorded by British officer J.W.C. Kirk and included in his book.

Hali waa iga salaan
Halna wa iga sacab-qaad
Halna wa iga suaal
Hal wa i sacabqaad
wa i Suldaanka amaanti
Siraadki Berberad
iyo wa haldhaa subax joga
baalashi kala sidoo
wax la sisto la waa
Halna wa iga salan
Geela, Seenyo iyo Laan
Sangayaasha qararystay
Gabdhahaa suurta la moodo
iyo seyaxaanu ku jifna
Sadadaada nabad ba leh

— Habr Jelo Geeraar
Translation:

First we salute thee
Then we shake your hands
Then we ask a question
First is our handshake
is praise to our Sultan
the light of Berbera
Who is as an ostrich standing in the morning
Shaking out his wings
beyond compare
Again we salute thee
The camels, Senyo and Lan,
The stallions have become fat
The young girls are like straight sticks,
and we lie in the dew
the tribute is one of peace

=== The Berbera Mission incident and the rise of Sultan Nur (1898–1899) ===
According to the primary British archival records from 1898 and 1899, the catalyst for the Dervish movement was not a religious dispute in the interior, but a direct political and social confrontation in the port of Berbera led by Sultan Nur Aman.

British Foreign Office files document a growing friction regarding the French Roman Catholic Mission in Berbera. The "emotional trigger" that mobilized Sultan Nur occurred when he encountered a Somali boy at the mission school. When asked his name and clan, the boy allegedly replied that his name was "John" and that he had no clan, only the "Mission."

To a sovereign leader like Sultan Nur, this represented the total erasure of Somali identity and lineage. He interpreted the mission's actions not merely as religious conversion, but as the "buying" of Somali children to dismantle the traditional social and religious structures of the protectorate.

Sultan Nur and a delegation of elders brought a formal grievance to the British Consul-General, James Hayes Sadler. As recorded in the meeting transcripts, Sadler dismissed their concerns as "baseless" and "superstitious."

The breakdown of diplomacy was sealed when Sadler famously suggested that if the children were being cared for and educated, the elders "should be grateful rather than complaining." This dismissive retort—prioritizing feeding over the preservation of the Somali soul—was viewed as a profound insult to Sultan Nur’s sovereign honor and served as the specific catalyst that drove the Habr Yunis leadership to formally support an armed uprising.

In a critical report sent to the Foreign Office in April 1899, Sadler explicitly named Sultan Nur as the "principal agitator" who had moved into the interior to spread news of the mission’s actions.

By the end of March 1899, Sultan Nur reached Kob Fardod (near Burao). It was here that he met with Elmi Duala chief headman of the local Reer Yusuf the Musa Ismail head of the clans a Habr most importantly the chief mullah, namely Haji Osman Abdullah Naleya the head of Rashidia- Ahmedia and other religious scholars.

The Architect of Resistance: While the Sayyid provided the religious oratory, Sultan Nur provided the military weight of the Habr Yunis and the political legitimacy of a deposed ruler. His arrival at Kob Fardod in late March is documented as the formal inception of the Dervish movement, marking him as the movement's political founder and primary architect.

In response to his mobilization efforts, Sadler gathered a group of elders and issued a decree attempting to depose Sultan Nur and replace him with a pro-British nominee. This administrative move effectively declared war on Sultan Nur’s authority, cementing the transition from a religious protest to a national Dervish rebellion.

== A chronology of the first two years of the Dervish movement, February 1899 – March 1901 ==
In mid-February 1899, Mohammed Abdullah Hassan, later the spiritual head of the Dervish movement, for the first time came to the attention of the British authority at Berbera. James Hayes Sadler updating the colonial office on April 12, 1899, stated that the Somali Coastal Administration initially came to hear about this Mullah of Kob Fardod on mid February 1899 when the new Stipendiary Akil Ahmed Muhammad Shermarki (Habr Yunis, Mussa Arrah) raided some livestock belonging to the religious mullahs of Kob Fardod. This incident brought Sultan Nur to the tariqa at Kob Fardod, after Sultan Madar Hirsi, his rival, assisted the mullahs in recovering the stocks and thus gaining the allegiance and support of the tariqa for his rival sultanate.

Contrary to the fanciful adventure later writers wrote about him, the Mullah only came to the attention of the British in February 1899, he never confronted the authority at Berbera upon arrival in 1895 as some claim, nor were there major uprisings in Berbera as official Somali biographies purport, much of this embellishment was a later invention, beyond a few complaints about not receiving their full herds, the mullahs at Kob Fardod and Mohammed Abdullah Hassan had no complaints against the British coastal administration and even the French Roman Catholic Mission which had been established in Berbera since the early 1890s. Mohamed Abdullah Hassan lived in Berbera and his relatives both Duale Liban, a clerk in Berbera customs, and Deria Magan, a personal translator of the council-general, both held high positions in Berbera administration. Mohammed Abdullah Hassan married a sister of Duale Liban and had his first son Mahdi in Berbera in 1893. Throughout the month of March, the Mullahs peacefully corresponded with the coastal authority in friendly terms, requesting the remainder of their herd.

On March 29, 1899, the vice-council at the coast sent a letter to the Mullah requesting the return of a stolen rifle. The Mullah replied in person to this letter as it was addressed to him personally, denying any knowledge of such a matter.

On April 10, camel sowar Ahmed Adan, who carried the letter to the mullah, arrived at Berbera with two replies and made a report to the effect that the assembled mullahs at Kob Fardod and the various tribesmen adopted a hostile attitude and referred to him as a Kafir in addition he reported that a number of them had rifles and were practicing.

On April 20, Dragoman Deria Magan, Hayes Sadler's personal translator and a relative of the Mullah was sent to ascertain the nature of the activities at Kob Fardod. He reported that the Mullah had 52 rifles with about 200 rounds of ammunition and that the various tribesmen Habr Toljaala and Dolbahnata were wavering and they hold no hostile attitude towards the administrations. He added that the Mullah had abandoned the cause of Sultan Madar Hirsi and was now espousing the sultanate of Nur who had recently brought presents and was with him. He also stated that the Mahmood Girad had recently raided the Aligheri.

At the end of April 1899, the dervish movement was declared adopting the term "dervish" to refer to their core followers not their allied clans-men, and they also announced their independence, having their own Amir, Sultan and chiefs. However, they didn't declare war or open hostility, they merely requested to be respected as an independent community.

At the end of June 1899, Sultan Nur leaves the tariqa at Kob Fardod and arrives in his country Odweina in an effort to collect arms and men from the western section of the Habr Yunis clan. On June 27, James Hayes Sadler sent a letter to Nur inquiring about his intentions and involvement in the new movement, no reply was received.

In early July 1899, Sultan Nur called for a tribal assembly for the western Habr Yunis on July 22. However, the assembly was aborted when most of the western Habr Yunis clan refused to join the rebellion. Sultan Nur, failing to convince the western Habr Yunis, left eastward to Burao joining the eastern section of the clan who declared allegiance to the new dervish cause.

In the end of August 1899, the dervish assembled at Burao, declaring an open war. On September 1 a letter arrived from the dervish camp at Burao to Berbera essentially a declaration of war.

In September 1899, after assembling at Burao the Dervish and their clan allies attacked the western Habr Yunis at Odweina under the insistence of Sultan Nur to punish the clansmen who opposed his call to join the rebellion. Also at the end of September they burned and looted the Ahmadia Tariqa at Sheikh.

In October 1899, the chief of the Dolbahnata, Girad Ali Farah, was murdered by the Dervish. The Dolbahnata chief Girad Ali Farah sent a letter to the British Coastal administration disavowing the Mullah's cause and the Dervish rebellion.

In November 1899, the core Dervish forces crossed the border into Ethiopia and settled at Harradiggit (Hara-Digeed).

In March 1900, the Dervish allies in the Ogaden were defeated at the battle of Jig Jiga, no dervishes participated in this battle.

In July 1900, The Dervishes loot and raid the Aidagalla clan in Ethiopia.

In August 1900, the dervish attack the habr Awal tribe killing 220 including women and children, losing 130 raiders killed.

In October 1900, a combined various Isaq tribes (Samatar/Ahmed Abdalla, Habr Yunis and Aidagalla) attack the dervish and the Ogaden in retaliations crossing the border into Ethiopia.

In March 1901, the dervish reentered Somaliland protectorate after being pushed out by the Abyssinian forces and their Somali tribal allies (Mohamed Zubeir Ogaden) from the Ethiopian border.

== The Somali Dervish History "Taariikhda Daraawiishta Soomaaliyeed" 1899–1920 ==
The Somali Dervish movement was an armed rebellion that abruptly began in the spring of 1899 and lasted some twenty years until 1920. Initially, the rebellion began as an anti-French Roman Catholic Mission revolt. The rebelling mullahs and leaders opposed the church's missionary activities, in particular, the education/adoption of young children and in some instances converting them to Christianity. They also protested what they alleged was an interference in their independence and a persecution of their members by the British Somali Coast administration.

The news of the incident that sparked the Dervish rebellion and to the almost twenty one years insurrection according to the consul-general James Hayes Sadler was either spread or as he alleged was concocted by Sultan Nur. The incident in question was that of a group of Somali children who were converted to Christianity and adopted by the French Catholic Mission at Berbera in 1899. Whether Sultan Nur experienced the incident first hand or whether he was told of it is not clear, but what is known is that he propagated the incident in the Tariqa at Kob Fardod in April 1899, precipitating the religious rebellion that later transformed into the Somali Dervish.

The Christian Somali children incident is erroneously attributed to Mohammed Abdullah Hassan the later spiritual head of the movement. Despite their anti-Christian profession, the dervish in Somaliland targeted primarily Somali nomads who were indifferent to their cause or wholly ignorant of it, for twenty odd years the Dervish wreaked havoc on the Somali nomads, through mostly looting and outright killings.

In 1909 the French Catholic Mission in Berbera was closed by the British colonial administrations, when most of the clans demanded that the mission activity should be suspended, as it was the pretext of the Dervish raids on Somali nomads. They also demanded that the Mullah Mohammed Abdullah Hassan and the Dervish be crushed and finally Risaldar Major Haji Musa Farah the highest native officer of Somaliland and an ardent adversary of the Mullah and the Dervish was to be replaced due to abuse of power. Reginald Wingate and Rudolf Carl von Slatin were tasked in 1909 to ascertain the Somali nomad's attitude to both the administration and the dervish and to advise the British colonial office as to how to improve the situation in the protectorate.

Despite the closing of the French Catholic Mission and the British administration withdrawal to the coast at the end of 1909, the dervish continued to raid and maraud in the interior of the country until 1914, when the British reconquered the interior to pacify the well-armed marauding clans and push the dervish back from endangering the coast.

From 1914 to 1919, the colonial administrator severely eliminated the military power and influence of the dervish in the far interior of the protectorate after a long, slow campaign employing the King's African Rifles (some native Somalis and non-natives included within their rank), and the Somaliland Camel Corps and irregulars called "Ilaalos" or native scouts.

Finally in 1919, a final plan to crush the Dervish using airplanes was devised and between January – February 1920 the dervish forts were bombarded and most of the dervish members either were killed, captured or fled to Ethiopia. A final raid of 3000 Habar Yoonis, Habar Jeclo and Dhulbahante horsemen led by tribal chief Haji Waraba raided the Dervish in Ethiopia putting an end to a movement that terrorized the majority of the Somali nomads irrespective of clan affiliations for two decades.

The movement had its spiritual leader Mohammed Abdullah Hassan, it's Sultan Nur Ahmed Aman and its Chief Lieutenant Ahmed Warsama Haji Sudi.

== The beginning of Dervish movement April–August 1899 ==
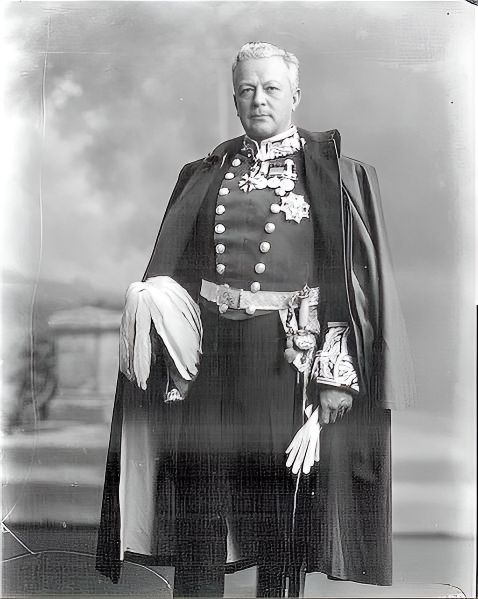
Lieutenant colonel Sir James Hayes Sadler KCMG CB FRGS (11 October 1851 – 21 April 1922)

In the middle of February last, Ahmed Muhammad, who had just been made a Stipendiary Akil in the place of his father, Muhammad Shermarki, deceased, signalized his accession to office by heading a raid by his tribe, the Habr Yunis Mussa Arrah, on some camels belonging to the Mullah and his people. As soon as news of this raid reached me a party of the Camel Corps was sent out to intercept the raiders. This was successfully done, Ahmed Muhammad being brought into Berbera from 60 miles off with over sixty raided camels. These were returned to the Mullah, who wrote a civil letter of thanks, adding that there were more camels to be returned, and hoping they would be sent. In the meanwhile, the Mullah collected a force from the Dolbahanta region and moved against the Habr Yunis. He was written to and told that as his camels had been recovered for him there was no necessity to proceed against the Habr Yunis, and that he should return to his country. There was then no reason to suppose that he was actuated by any desire (other) than that of recovering his raided animals. In the Habr Yunis country, however, he was joined by Madar Hirsi, the rival of Sultan Nur for the Sultanship of the Habr Yunis, and his party.

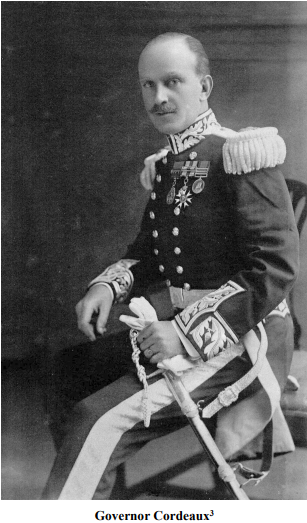
A photo of Sir Harry Cordeaux

This incident brought Sultan Nur to Kob Fardod around March, 1899. Sultan Nur's main objective was to dislodge his rival Madar and to gain the allegiance of the mullahs of Kob Fardod. In March 1899, one Duwaleh Hirsi, a former member of the Somali Aden police, then Mr Percy Cox's (former counsel-resident of Zeila and Berbera, 1893–1895) expedition guide in Somaliland allegedly stole a rifle and sold it to the tariqa at Kob Fardod. The vice-counsel at the coast Harry Edward Spiller Cordeaux sent a letter to the mullahs at Kob Fardod demanding the return of the rifle. Sultaan Nur was in Kob Fardod from March–June 1899. The letter was carried by a Somali mounted police officer named Ahmed Adan, upon his return after the delivery of the letter Cordeaux interviewed Adan and he provided the following information:

I knew many of the people there—some of them were relations of mine. My brother-in-law, Dualeh Aoreb, was there. I asked them if they had any rifles, they said they at first had only six, but had just received fifty-five from Hafoon. I saw two or three of the new lot, they are Martins(new). They told me they had one or two "14-shot rifles". I saw some Mullahs walking about with Sniders. The Sheikh himself and some of his Mullahs used to practice daily shooting at a target; they put up a shield against a tree. I used to talk with people every day. We talked about many things, some of the words they said were good and others were bad. They called me a Kafir, and laughed at my uniform, saying that I smelt, and asking me why I wore the Sircars clothes. There were hundreds of people there, some from every tribe, Dolbahanta, Habr Toljaala, and Habr Yunis.

What is particularly revealing about Ahmed Adan's interview is the confusion that was caused by another letter carried by a Somali one Salan supposedly a message also from the British administration at the coast. This second letter angered the mullahs at the Tariqa;

On the third day the Mullah sent for me. I had seen him before; he often used to come into the house. I went to him, and he said he would give me his reply to the letter I had brought; that he had just received another letter which had been brought by a Somali. He asked me about it, but I told him I knew nothing about it, and asked him who had brought it. He said, "A Somali". A man named Salan had come in that day. I thought that he must have brought the letter. He then gave me a letter. It was written on the back of the letter I had brought him. I saw the Government stamp on it. He (the Sheikh) said, "This is the reply to your letter. I will give you the answer to the other letter to-morrow". He said that the second letter contained "bad words". Next morning he gave me two letters, and I then went away, and got into Berbera on Saturday night.

The second letter provoked the mullahs, the hostile tone in the reply is due to the offensive second letter carried by Salan the Somali. Both replies, one regarding the rifle curt but relatively inoffensive and a second addressing the confusing insolent second letter are in the British record.

Deria Magan, a relative of the Mullah Mohamed Abdullah Hassan (the later spiritual head of the movement), and chief translator of the Somali coastal administration since 1884 visited the tariqa, he added nothing new to the general information gathered earlier by Ahmed Aden other than the fact that purportedly some clans are leaving the mullah and that the mullahs have abandoned Madar Hersi and were now paying allegiances to Sultan Nur, whose sultanate the Mullahs are now embracing.

Another letter from the mullahs at Kob Fardod arrived at the coast on May 3, 1899, this letter had an overall beseeching neutral tone. The mullahs pleaded with the administration not to escalate the manner and pleaded to be left alone; but what is noteworthy in this letter is that the followers of the tariqa and its leaders now declared that they were an independent government with their own Emir persumbl the Mullah, a Sultan, Nur persumbly and subject, naturally the clans that frequented Kob Fardod Dolbahanta, Habr Tol J'alaa and the eastern Habr Yunis.

Praise be to God in all matters, and the blessing of God on our Prophet and his descendants, who are the best of men. This letter is sent by all the Dervishes, the Amir, and all the Dolbahanta to the Ruler of Berbera. We say that we complain against you and against your subjects. Our camels are oppressed by you. We assist your Biladiyahs, and turn away those who backbite you; but you do not guard our reputation, and do not turn away those who backbite us. We inform you that there is peace in all the country; there is no fear. Secondly, I ask you, by God, by your Prophet, by your religion, and by your Church, do not create a disturbance in the country, do not ruin the country, for there is no harm on us if we leave your country, and drink our own milk, and eat our own meat; for if you oppress us, beat our people, take our money, and imprison our people, we will leave coming to your country, and the country will be ruined. We are a Government, we have a Sultan, an Amir, and Chiefs, and subjects. And how much of wisdom and forethought have we? This is what we have written, and salaam.

It is unknown when exactly the tribal followers of the Kob Fardod tariqa and their leaders adopted the term "dervish", but the general time was at the end of April 1899. Sadler, updating the colonial office, sent the following updates on the progress of the movement in mid-June 1899;

Camp, Oodweina, Jun 16, 1899. Mullah Muhammad Abdullah has made no further move, and I have no further information as to his possible intentions. He is now at Bohotele, where he was for a time laid up with fever, brought on during his expedition against the Mahmood Girad. This expedition was not the success previous reports had made it out to be. He obtained no restitution of looted property, and his party was attacked, losing one man killed and several wounded. The horses he brought back were given him by some of the nearer sections of the tribe who had looted them from their neighbors. Sultan Nur is still with him, but is said to be soon returning to his country, when I shall take as early an opportunity as possible of coming to an understanding with him. Outwardly the country is quiet, despite reports of intended movements by one tribe against another which are always rife in Somaliland. All those who have been attracted to the Mullah call themselves Dervishes, and give out that they "do not want the Government". They further designate those who do not join them as Kaffirs, which has naturally aroused the indignation of the rival religious sects.

Sultan Nur returned to his country at the end of June 1899 after more than three months sojourn in Kob Fardod. On June 27 Sadler sent a letter to him, Sadler did not mention what exactly was said in the letter but from Sultan Nur's reaction, the content of the letter was not to his liking. He immediately arrested the camel sowar and stripped him of his gun. Hayes Sadler updating the colonial office of the new development:

Hargaisa, July 16, 1899. I have already informed your Lordship that the Habr Yunis are divided, and that this time last month only the eastern sections of the tribe had so far tribes affected by the Mullah's movement, the western section awaiting the return of Sultan Nur. Nur had called a large meeting of the tribe for the 22nd instant at Odweina, and I had arranged to have a man present to report what takes place. Yesterday I received letters from Haji Musa, the Head of the Mullah Community of Hahiya, informing me that the westerly sections of the Habr Yunis, including the principal portion of Sultan Nur's own tribe, the Rer Segullah, together with the Ishak sections, bordering on the Golis, amongst whom I passed, and whose elders I interviewed on my way here had bound themselves together to keep clear of all disturbance. They are said to have told Sultan Nur that they are dependent on Berbera for their supplies, and that they do not intend to get into difficulties with us on his account, and to have told him pointedly that if he does not ease from making strife in the country, and oppressing people by his exactions, he had better clear off as they would oppose him. If he remained quiet, and did not oppose the Government, they would accept him as Sultan, otherwise, they would have nothing to do either with him or with Madar Hirsi. As regards the Mullah, they are said to have declared that they belong to the Kadiriyah sect, that of Haji Musa, of Hahiya, and Sheik Mattar, of Hargaisa, as opposed to the Salihiya.[1] Sultan Nur hastily left eastward, and is supposed to have repaired to Burao, whence he will probably rejoin the Mullah. The eastern sections of the Habr Yunis are still with the Mullah, but the Position has so far improved that the westerly sections, whose attitude had before been doubtful, are now said to have definitely declared against Sultan Nur and the Mullah. At this point there is now every reason to believe this movement will now stop in its movement westwards, leaving the line of division as reported in my previous dispatch"

Having failed to win over the western section of his tribe for the rebellion and the tribal assembly planned for July 22 having been aborted by Mullah Haji Musa of Hahia (head Mullah of the Ahmediyya tariqa at Hahi), Sultan Nur for the last time left to the east and to Burao and joined the eastern section of the rebellious tribe in his eastern headquarters. A few weeks later, at the end of August, the dervish and their clan followers assembled at Burao, the Mullah with his followers from the Dolbahanata, the various Habr Toljaala sub-clans with their principal headmen (Haji Sudi, Deria Arale, and Duale Adle) and Sultan Nur with his followers from eastern Habr Yunis clan, declared open hostility. The assembled dervish and their clan allies sent the following stern letter to Captain Cordeaux and James Hayes Sadler:

This is to inform you that you have done whatever you have desired, and oppressed our well-known religion without any cause. Further, to inform you that whatever people bring to you they are liars and slanderers. Further, to inform you that Mahomed, your Akil, came to ask from us the arms we therefore, send you this letter. Now choose for yourself; if you want war we accept it, if you want peace pay the fine.

— September 1, 1899.

After assembling at Burao the Dervish and their clan allies, the Adan Madoba, Rer Yusuf, Ali Gheri, Jama Siad and the Musa Ismail what the Sadler calls forces from the Dhulbahnate in his correspondence attacked the western Habr Yunis at Odweina in September 1899 under the insistence of Sultan Nur to punish the clansmen who opposed his call to join the rebellion and instead heeded the rival tribal mullah Haji Musa. Having punished the western Habr Yunis their next target was the Ahmadia Tariqa at Sheikh. They burned and looted the tariqa about the end of September, the various dervish clan followers dispersed and the core dervish moved back once they came. The Mullah and Sultan Nur apparently had a disagreement and they and their followers separated, the Mullah to Lasder with his Ali Gheri and the principle Dervish of the Aden Madoba including Haji Sudi while Sultan Nur with the Musa Ismail and Rer Yusuf moved to the Arori plains and the various Habar Tojalaa followers camped at Ber.

During this time the Dolbahnata chief Girad Ali Farah sent a letter to the British Coastal administration disavowing the Mullah and the Dervish. In October the chief of the Dolbahnata, Girad Ali Farah, was murdered by the Dervish. Through the end of 1899 most of the earlier tribal followers of the Dervish made their peace with the coastal administration, all deputations from Dolbahnata, Habr Yunis and Habr Tojalaa made peace. The core Dervish elements however crossed the border into Ethiopia in November 1899 and settled at Harradiggit (Hara-Digeed) along with their leaders.

Once the Dervish settled in Harradiggit and Milmil throughout 1900 with total followers around 1,000 of Ali Geri, Ogaden and 200 Midgans, the Dervish raided the local clans. They raided the Aidagale in July 1900, followed by a devastating raid on Samanter Abdillah and Ahmed Abdillah (Habr Awal) in September 1900, killing over 220 men, women and children. The affected tribesmen then raided the Dervish at Milmil and Harradiggit, also the Abyssinians began to raid the Dervish around the same time. Finally, in March 1901, the Dervish were compelled to go back to their old settlement and they crossed the border back into Somaliland and settled in Samala (Sacmala) a village near Buhoodle. The British administrations by then had assembled enough tribal forces, mostly from tribes that had been looted and massacred by the Dervish. Led by twenty-two British officers and trained by Indian drill officers, the tribal forces then ready to battle the Dervish.

== The British and dervish wars 1901–1904 ==
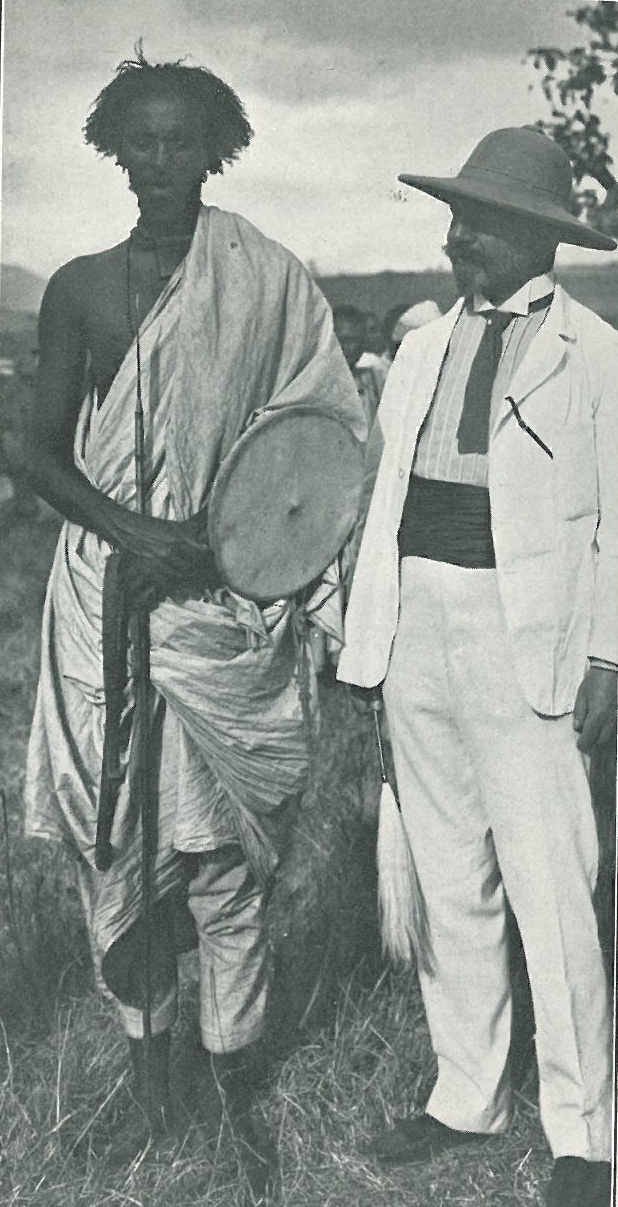
Sheywal Abdi, Habr Awal tribe, a poet and a dervish commander who defected to the English side after a fallout with Sultan Nur, 1905. The dervish murdered his two wives and six children and in retaliation he killed 23 dervishes for revenge

== Samala battle June 2–3, 1901, known as Afbakayle in Somali ==
Before dispatching forces to face the Dervish at Samala Consul-General Hayes Salder made the following instructions to the overall commander of the forces

Eric John Eagles Swayne:

In the unlikely event of the: Mullah offering to surrender, in his case and that of the Following: Ahmed Warsama (known as Haji Sudi), Deria Arale, Deria Gure Only an unconditional surrender should be accepted no guarantee of any kind to future treatment been given. Sultan Nur the late sultan of the Habr Yunis, may be guaranteed his life.

— J. Hayes-Sadler, His Britannic Majesty's Consul-General, Somali Coast Protectorate. Aden April 11, 1901.

By December 1900, 21 officers of the British and Indian army with a force of 1,500 Somali Levy from the looted tribes were ready to operate against the dervish in 1901. To prevent the Dervish from fleeing west across the Ethiopian border, Ethiopian cooperation was sought and the Abyssinian king sent a force of 8,000 soldiers in January 1901, the Ethiopian operations began at once, three months before the British expeditions, the Ethiopians managed to push the dervish across the Somaliland border and punish the clans who were involved in assisting the dervish.

On May 22 Swayne's forces on their way burned the entire settlement of Kob Fardod leaving only the mosque. Their next operation was to punish clans that supported the Mullah, they seized 3,500 camels from the Habr Toljaalaa Adan Madoba and the Dolbahanta Jama Siad. On June 2 these tribes, along with dervish forces, attacked McNeill's zariba at Samala to recapture their herds. On the afternoon of June 2, the dervish attacked McNeil's encampment (zeriba) with a force of some five hundred horse and two thousand foot. The dervish leaders Haji Sudi, Sultan Nur and the Mullah watched the battle from a nearby hill. After have been repulsed with many casualties, the dervish attacked the same night with no avail, on the 3rd of June the following morning at 9:00.A.M the dervish attacked with 5000 strong not been able to get anywhere near the zariba before having been shot, the dervish forces were broken, in the two-day fighting the dervish lost 180 dead on the battlefield and counted on the actual scene and 20 dead whom never been found . McNeil made a final estimate 200 dead and 300 killed/wounded because the enemy carried many of their deads in the two days battle., the British further claimed they have killed six hundreds, counted dead men who died on the road between Weylahed (weyl-lagu-xidh here where the subsequently the dervish came face to face with Swayne's flying column) and Ana Hargili (Caana-Xadhigle). McNeil lost 18 in killed and wounded.

Failing to regain their stocks, both the dervish and their clan allies retreated on June 3. Subsequently, it came to the knowledge of Swayne that the Mullah initially wanted to attack Swayne's zariba, but Sultan Nur persuaded the dervish that an attack on McNeill's zariba would yield some 400 rifles. The fleeing Dervish accidentally encountered the column of Swayne on the 4th of June, here at Weylahed a small skirmishes took place ending with a prolonged chase of the fleeing scattered dervish horsemen, but the dervish managed to escape. The pursuit continued until the dervish crossed into the Haud. A reporter from The London Times on June 22, 1901, sent a report of the campaigns describing the next encounter after Samala:

Prisoners asserted that the Mullah had sworn on the Koran to attack us that day, whatever the consequences might be, and Colonel Swayne, therefore, determined to anticipate him. We prepared to attack the largest body—that on the left side of the valley. The Camel Corps and Mounted Infantry at once moved out, and had proceeded some three miles, when scouts reported that the whole plain beyond the hill was simply swarming with men, both horse and foot, and that an attack' by the Mullah himself, with a large body of cavalry, on the rear of the column, was imminent. It was at once decided to zariba all the transport at the foot' of a small hill under the protection of two companies, and to engage the whole of the enemy with the remainder. Captain Mereweather, with a portion of the Mounted Infantry, was sent back to cover this movement of a large body of the ~ enemy's cavalry began to enter the' valley by an opening in the hills in the rear of our force. They advanced on the Mounted Infantry, firing as they came. The remainder of the Mounted Infantry and the Camel Corps were then reinforced by Captain. Mereweather, and after a few rounds from the Maxim the enemy began to move towards a defile' in the hills. The Mounted and Camel Corps at once started off at a hard galloping pursuit, and' after exciting long chase of about six miles caught up the enemy at the entrance to a "deep gorge in the hills". At this point some 20 of the enemy were slain, their losses killed during the pursuit being about 100. Our losses were two killed, five wounded, and seven horses killed. The retreat -here became a total rout. As the enemy went ' they dropped rifles and ammunition. Much of their ammunition is of the most deadly kind, flat-nosed bullets, split bullets, and soft-nosed bullets, with crosses cut in the tips, figuring prominently. It appeared certain that all three of the enemy's leaders were in front of our men. Namely, the Mad Mullah himself, Haji Sudi, and Sultan Nur, and we needed no further incentive to do our best. At intervals, hand to land fights took place, and the losses of the enemy were evinced by the number of riderless horses.

Subsequently, the British forces concluded from the dervish dead the implicated clans and found out that the bulk of the dervish forces at Samala were of the sub clans of Kayat, Aadan Madoba, Rer Hagar, Ali Gheri, Nur Ahmed, Jama Siad, and Mijjarten. On June 19 Sawayne decided to punish the refractory clans by ceasing their herds, the Jama Siad and Rer Hagar easily came to terms, by July 8 the operations concluded where the Ali Gheri losing some 60 men and some 6,000 camels the last clans came to submission and their elders came to Berbera.

== Ferdiddin July 17, 1901 ==
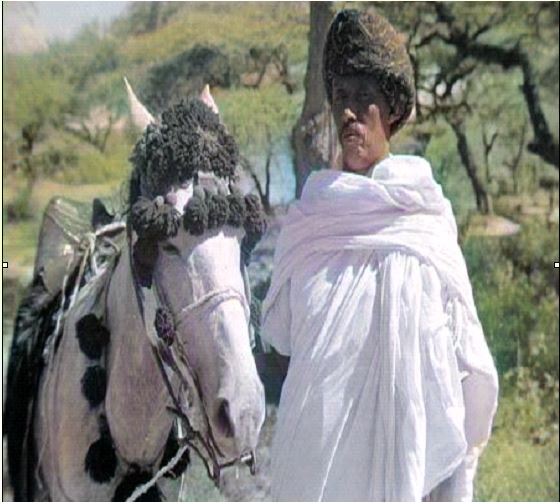
Suldaan Diiriye Garaad. 1947.

Recrossing the border from the Haud into Italian Somalia in the Mudug region, the Mullah collected his most fanatical followers the real dervish (men who were mostly mullahs and under oath to fight to the end as opposed to tribal opportunistic clan allies), the dervish withdrew from Mudug and arrived back into British Somaliland and encamped in Beretabli. Swayne arriving at Courgerod with his forces made contacts with the rear of the enemies and spies later discover the bulk of the enemy forces were in force in Firidddin. Swayne chose to attack at early down travelling through the night, with 700 men 75 mounted and 100 left behind to guard the supplies, Swayne attacked with 600 men and 350 Dolbahnata tribesmen, they attacked the Dervish at Ferdiddin. Sawyne described the fight at Firdiddin in his official correspondence:

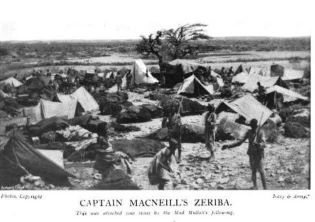
Captain MCneil Zariba. Battle of Samala. 1901.

On getting this news I moved my force from Bohotele via Yaheyl and Weyla Hedd to Firdiddin, and attacked the Mullah at later place. The Mullah's Mijjertein riflemen were in considerable strength with Lebel and Martini-henry rifles. His force were however scattered, and he himself was driven back into Italian territory. The Mijjertein lost heavily, and also the Mullah's own family. His brother-in-law, Gaibdeed, was killed, as well as two sons-in-law, Haji Sudi's brother and nephews, &c. Sultan Nur's camels and the Mullah's cattle were captured. The pursuit was carried on into the bush in the Haud.

Gaibdeed and two of his sons (been the brother of Haji Sudi and nephews) were among the leaders killed. The dervish lost a large numbers of well known mullahs and over 60 bodies counted. The fleeing dervish fared no better after five days in the waterless Haud many died and Haji Sudi, the Mullah and his eldest son only survived by water from the stomach of slaughtered camels. After the defeat the enemy fled south across the Italian border and were pursued some miles the forces had to stop to regroup. Short of water and some 50 miles away from their nearest supplies Swayne was compelled to abort the pursuit. Facing the authentic dervish mostly mullahs, Swayne was impressed by their tenacity and ferocity, commenting:

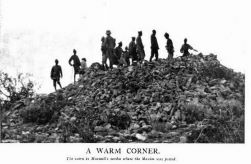
Teeridii Qoriga Gildhigaanku Saarnaa Dagaalkii Afbakayle.

I was impressed with the danger of the Dervish movement. Until I actually saw the Mullah's men fighting, I had no idea that a Somali could be so influenced by fanaticism. I am speaking of the Dervishes, the men who, following the custom of the Suakin Dervishes, have thrown over father and mother and their own tribe to follow the Mullah. They have passwords, wear a white turban and special bravery, and have sworn to throw up all worldly advantages. Of course a certain number even of these Dervishes have joined the Mullah simply for the sake of loot, but there are, on the other hand, a considerable number who are pure fanatics. At Ferdiddin and at McNeil's Zeriba these were the men who led and who were shot down. At Ferdiddin, after the others had fled, a number of these men remained behind to fight to end, and were shot down as we advanced. When recording the name of the enemy's dead, I found that a large number were Hajis or Sheikhs.

== Erigo/Erego October 6–7, 1902, known as Beer-dhiga battle in Somali ==
In December 1901 the Dervish raided the a sub sections of the Habr Tojaalaa and on February 1, 1902, news reached the Somaliland protectorate British authority that the Dervish were planning a raid against the tribes from their positions east of the protectorate. On February 7 and 13, the dervishes waged a devastating attack on Habr Yunis and Dolbahnata tribes men east of Burao. The London Gazette reported "On the 7th February, the Mullah had despatched another raiding force against our Jama Siad friendly tribes, 100 miles to the east of the scene of his raid of the 13th February, and here again our tribes suffered heavily. Burao and Berbera became filled with destitute refugees and 2000 persons were fed daily at Burao alone." 1903

On the first week of October the Somali and Yoas led by few British officers at last arrived within the reach of their enemies. They formed a Zariba in a clearing Awan Eergo in a very dense bush, and around 4 pm the enemy were hiding in all the surrounding bushes. The British led forces were compelled to advance slowly, immediately the Dervish attacked from all directions causing the British led forces front line to fall back in a disarray, but the rear companies stood firm holding their position, the 2nd King African Rifles and 6th King Africans Rifles in the extreme right and left, however, fell back in a sudden panic, rescued by one-half company in the front the troops rallied and held their ground under intense fire. In the severity of the fight the transport camels stampeded with the 2nd African Rifles and two Somali companies Ltd Swayne managed to push the enemies for 2 miles and recover 1,800 of the transport camels. in the aftermath of the battle it was discovered a maxim gun was missing, casualties included 2 officers killed and 56 levies. Both the Somali and Yoa performed great in the 6th but on the 7th of October the severity of the fight sunk their spirit and the officers leading the forces complained that they couldn't rely on their men. The dervish in the other hand lost greatly, some 62 death 40 of them Hajis and Mullahs and all 6 commanders of their force were killed,

In the western side of the protectorate the highest Somali native officer Risaldar-major Musa Farah attacked the dervish tribal allies, "By June 10, Musa Farah's detached Levy of 450 rifles had reached Kurmis. After collecting 5,000 tribesmen from the western side of the Protectorate, Musa Farah had transported them across the waterless Haud where it was over 100 miles broad, had attacked the western Dervish encampments, had routed them in all directions, and had finally succeeded in transporting his force back across the Haud, together with his captured livestock, amounting to 1,630 camels, 200 cows, and 2,000 sheep. For this service His Majesty King Edward VII rewarded the Risaldar-Major with a sword of honour."

At the conclusion of the first and second expeditions, the British administrations and the colonial office were satisfied at the conclusion of the first two expeditions, despite the leaders of the Dervish having not all been either killed or captured. Gabriel Ferrand, the Vice-Council of France following these events observed that "Neither the Mahdi nor his chief advisor Ahmed Warsama, better known under the name Haji Sudi, nor the Sultan Nur, leader of the Habr Younis clan were killed or captured. The optimism Colonel Sadler and Lieutenant-Colonel Swayne in the latest reports relating to military operations is inexplicable."

== Gumburu April 17, 1903 and Daratoleh April 22, 1903 ==
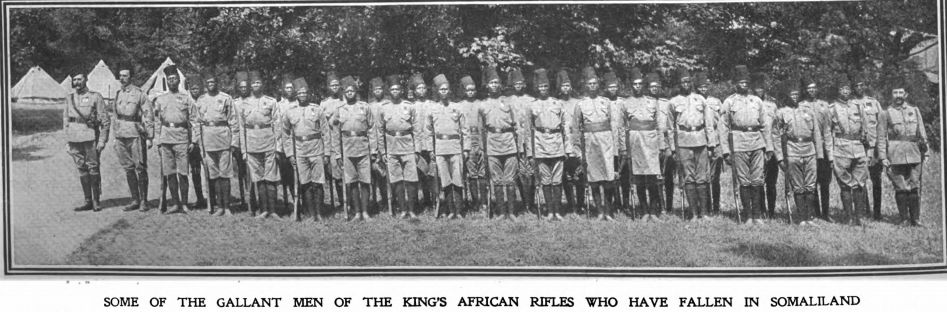
King's African Rifles

The third expedition was launched January 3, 1903 with a new commander, Sir William Henry Manning. The plane was to encircle and trap the dervish from all sides. The main body of the forces were to advance from Obbia in Italian Somalia to the wells of Galkayo while one land at Berbera and form lines through Bohotleh. The dervish leaders, upon hearing news of the Obbia forces landing with a body of horsemen, left for Milmil and Haradiggitt rallying tribal allies:

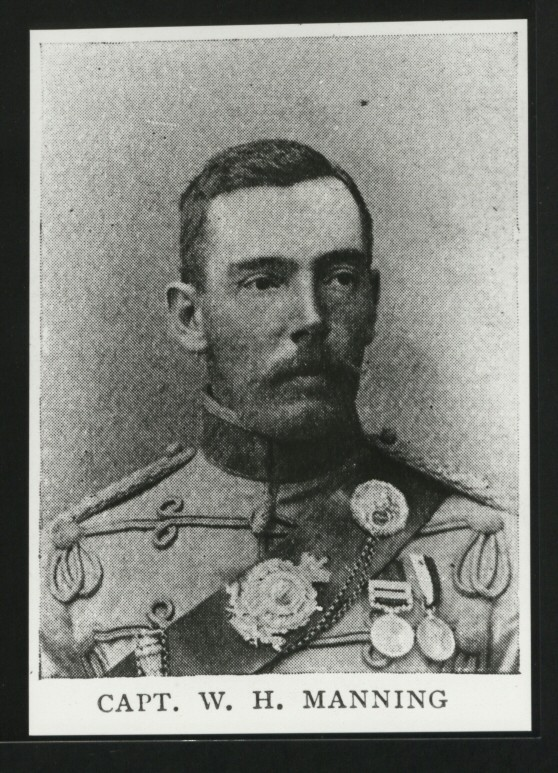
The National Archives UK - CO 1069-111-7

Towards the end of March news reached the British forces of whereabouts the bulk of the dervish forces. Defectors and captives claimed the dervish forces were in Galadi. A reconnaissance patrol led by captain Plunkett was sent by Manning to Galadi where they met the bulk of the dervish forces majority made of Somali Bantu clans of the Makana and Derjele tribes. Between 16 and 17 April the British small forces made up of Somalis, Indians and Yaos were encircled from all directions and decimated. All 9 officers were killed and 89 rank and file were killed. The battle took place in a small hill Gumburu close to Galadi. Before the news of the disaster at Gumburu made it to the British forces another column from Bohotleh forces engaged another dervish forces at Daratoleh the later forces were defeated by the British forces. John Gough (VC) The bulk of the main dervish forces without their tribal allies moved to Halin in June 1903; according to the intelligence report of the period:

"A deserter from the enemy stated that the Mullah. accompanied by Haji Sudi and Sultan Nur, with a large force of horse and footmen, reached Kurmis on 8th June, camped near Lasakante on 9 June, and moved towards Dannot early on 10 June on their way towards the Nogal. On 12th June mounted scout could not get through from Bohotle to Dannot owing to the numbers of the enemy's horsemen watching the road. On 13th June two deserters from the mullah came into Bohotle and stated that the Mullah with his whole force was on his way to Nogal with a view of establishing his Haroun at Halin. Intelligence Report from 11th July 1903".

August 4, 1903 – a deserter from the Mullah, named Abbas Isman (Ibrahim), came into Bohotle at 5.30 a.m. His story is as follows Haji Sudi is still his trusted adviser. Sultan Nur still lives with the Mullah, but no longer is keen to help him. Abbas was with the Mullah at Wardair during the fight. When the fight was over a horseman galloped to Wardair and announced that the English had been wiped out. The Mullah immediately mounted his pony, Dodimer and rode hard to the field of battle. The Mullah was absent from the battle and much of the command of the dervish fighters fell upon Sultan Nur. This fact caused the rift between the Mullah and Sultan Nur which the informant alluded to in his report.

These two encounters, despite a heavy loss by the dervish, were the only dervish victory over the British forces.

== Jidballi January 10, 1904 ==
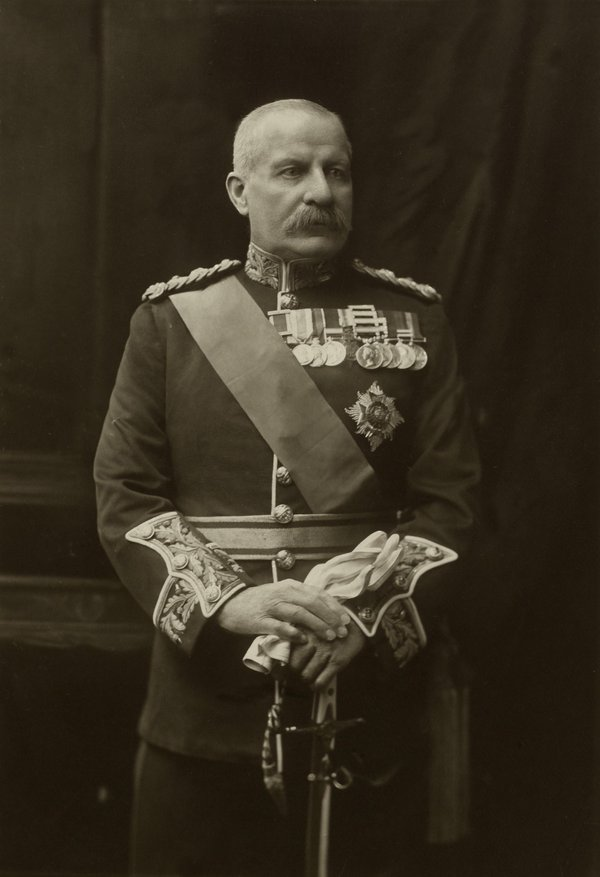
Sir Charles Egerton

This was not the mere handful they had fought at Samala, at Gumburu, or at Daratoleh. It was no reconnaissance, nor yet was it a hastily recruited tribal levy such as they had faced at Ferdhiddin or Erigo. In comparison, General Egerton's force at Jidbali must have seemed to them a mighty army; and, in very truth, it comprised some of the best seasoned British, Indian, and African troops at the Empire's disposal. On the other hand, the Darwishes numbered from 6000 to 8000 fighting men, representing the pick of the Mullah's forces.

The command of the British forces was taken over by major-general Charles Egerton with fresh reinforcement from India and Aden, on July 4, 1903, Egerton arrived at Berbera. From his arrival to mid October Egerton was engaged in improving roads, building an advance bases at kirrit and improving water supplies. Also Egerton raised two more Somali irregular mounted corps, the Gedabursi Horse (500 men from the Gedabursi clan) and the Tribal Horse (mainly from eastern Habr Yunis, Habr Tojalaa and Dolbahnata clans). Meanwhile, the dervish were encamped at Halin-Gerrowei-Kalis line of villages and they made Halin their main headquarter. In October the Dervish occupied the small port at Illig in the Mijjertein coast.

Manning was given orders to occupy Galadi and by end of November 1903 Galadi was occupied without incidents. The water was insufficient, Manning left a detachments there and stationed the bulk of his troops at Bohotle. The first clashes between the Dervish and British forces occurred in December 1903 when news came that the Dervish camp was formed at Jidbali. Egerton ordered lieutenant-Colonel Kenna to make a reconnaissances and to induce the Dervish in an engagement. Coming upon many dervish camp fires at Jidbali, Kenna opened fire in an attempt to dislodge the dervishes from their zaribas. After three hours of periodic fires Kenna withdrew estimating the enemy to be around 1,500 foot and 200 horsemen.

On January 9, Egerton assembled his massive forces 20 miles east of Badwein having ascertained the dervish were in force in Jidbali. On 10 January 1904, the dervish for the first time fought regular troops in an open country, also in terms of numbers of troops the British forces were the largest thus far. The Mullah was not present in the battle, he was curiously absent. Sending Kenna to the flank of the enemy to block any retreats, Egerton opened his mountain battery guns orderings his troops to kneel or lay down. Upon the commencing of the fight the dervish rushed from cover to cover to through grass and brushes attacking the left. However they were unable to stand the intensity of the fire, the dervish again regrouped and tried to attack from the front and the right. Sergeant Gibbs did an excellent job with the maxim gun, and the K.A.R and Sikh firing was remarkable, with in few minutes the dervish line collapsed and they retreated in full flight, pursued by the mounted Gedabursi Horses and Tribal Horses the rout of the dervish army was completed.

== Pestalozza Agreement 1904–1905 ==
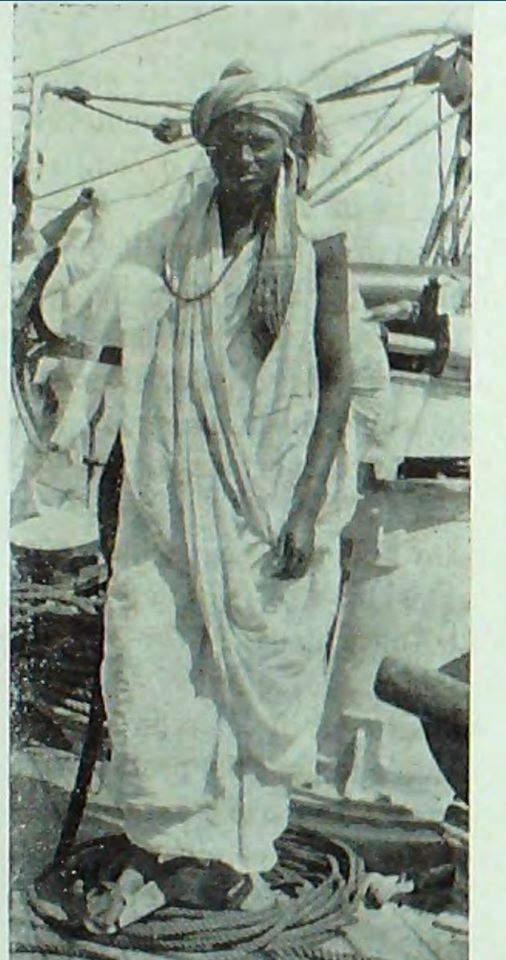
Dervish Abdullah Sheri 1909.

As the Mahdi of Khartoum and his lieutenant Osman Digna, H'àdjdj Mohammed ben Abdallah and his lieutenant H'àdjdj Soudi frequently write to the head of the British Protectorate and the commander of the expeditionary corps. They once offered peace on payment of compensation by Britain and the assignment of a port. At least as far back as in 1903 as Ferrand Gebriel noted the dervish offered terms for peace to the British.Pressured by the English and the Mijertein Somalis whom in their territory the dervish carved out a settlement, after consulting with his dervish and religious rebels, at last the dervish were desperate for peace and willing to negotiate. In 1904 the Mullah wrote to the Italians through Abdilahi Shahri a trusted dervish and his boyhood friend.

These initiative for these negotiations, started by the Mullah himself who wrote three letters in March 1904 to Lt. Vessel Spagna, commander of the Italian squad in Bender-Cassin. In August 1904; and from Aden, embarking on the royal ship Volturno, Pestalozza went to Bender Cassem, on the northern Somali coast, to feel the ground, and to send a courier to Mullah, who was in Upper Nogal, benefiting from these practices, as an intermediary, certainly Abdallah Sceri, a trusted man of Mullah himself, who had employed him in various missions. During the war, the British had captured him as a suspect, and then had to hand him over to the Italian consular authority, having claimed in his capacity as an Italian protégé. Councilor Abdallah Sheri was kept on board the Volturno, in a state of arrest, not allowed by the British Authorities to have relations with the natives in Aden and on the coast. He was the chief auxiliary of Pestalozza to the success of his mission.

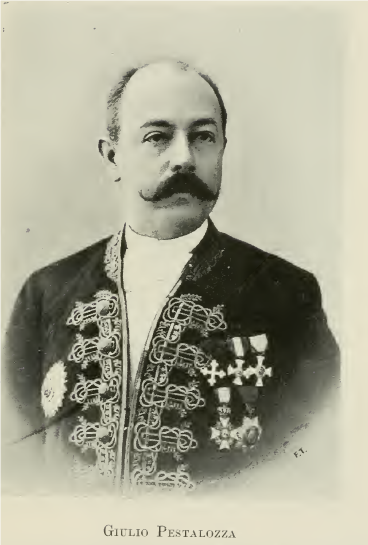
Giluio Pestalozza.

Giulio Pestalozza in his second meeting with the dervish October 17, 1904 was accompanied by Sylos and Paladini, two fellow Italians. After the second meeting the Mullah declared to Sheri and Pestalozza the following:

Now, O Pestalozza, you and Abdallah Sheri, are delegated by me and to you I bestow the power for our cause. If you ask me pacification, I accept the peace and mutual trust – and I promise to stop the discord and the war in the interior. I, the Derwishes and all my people will molest no one, neither Mijerteyns, nor the people of Yusuf Ali, neither the English nor their dependents. I and my people are the people and dependents of the Government of Italy if it favours us and cools our heart (the text says our stomach or our desire); we will be under its flag. We only request that the Government of Italy allow(s) us to build a country at a point which it will consider suitable, from Gabbee to Garad.

— Declaration by the Mullah to Pestalozza, Ilig, I7 October 1904.

After a long, three-way negotiation between the powers of Britain, Italy, Ethiopia and the Dervish, the British received a dervish delegation for a peace agreement:

1. Abdallah Shihiri, Habr Toljaala, Adan Madhoba; 2. Diria Arraleh, Habr Toljaala, Adan Madhoba; 3. Adem Egal, Mejertein, Rer Egaleh; 4. Moallem Mohamed Nur, Dolbahante Kayet.

On March 5, 1905, the treaty of Ilig or the Pestalozza agreement was signed between the dervish and the powers, the dervish represented by Sultan Nur and other dignitaries, who signed the final agreements. In the original Arabic, the following signatures appear - Sultan Nur Ahmed (the chief dervish sultan) and his brother Geele Ahmed (Kila Ahmed), Ugas Diria Arabe and Ugas Issa Farek.

The Dervish were now technically an Italian protected religious community, they had their own semi-autonomous enclave, the dervish agreed to live peacefully with their Miijerteyn neighbours, the Ethiopians and the British. The Italians granted a fixed sea access for the Dervish between Ras Garad and Ras Gabbe with an Italian representative as a governor with soldiers and custom house, till such representative arrive the Mullah himself shall act as an Italian agent. The Italians assigned the Nogal and Hawd in the Italian sphere of influence as a territory accessible to the dervish, in the English sphere the dervish were only granted grazing for their cattle in British Somaliland Nogal in the area limited by the wells of Halin, Hodin, Tifafale and Damot. On March 24, 1905, the four Dervish Representative and the commissioner of Somaliland Protectorate reaffirmed the March 5, 1905 Pestalozza and Dervish agreement.

Less than a year of the agreement, the dervish and the Mullah were back to their usual raids and general looting, the Mullah was not satisfied with the financial outcome of the agreement. In 1906 Eugenio Cappello the Italian council in Aden went with the usual Abdallah Sceri, to the Mullah who told him, openly, that Italy had failed in all the promises made to him by Pestalozza. "You promised me money," he said, "and I haven't seen it; you promised me that Osman Mahmud would bring down the fort, as this sort of surveillance that exercises on my movements annoys me and he has not done so: you promised me gifts, and the gifts did not come.

== Sultan Nur's death, 1907 ==
The last intelligence report mention of Sultan Nur in the Italian archives was in 1907. After the death of Sultan Nur 1907/1908 in the dervish camp at Illig, his son Dolal Sultan Nur ascended the sultanate in the dervish camp, while among the non-dervish Habr Yunis clans, Jama Sultan Hirsi Aman (the son of Sultan Hersi Aman circa 1824–1879), the first cousin of Sultan Nur, was proclaimed a sultan.

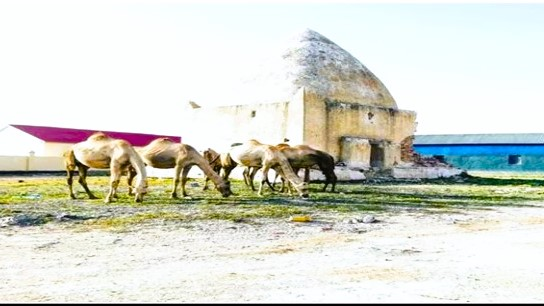
The tomb of the dervish Nur Ahmed Aman Constructed by the dervish themselves in 1910 honoring Nur's contribution creating the movement..

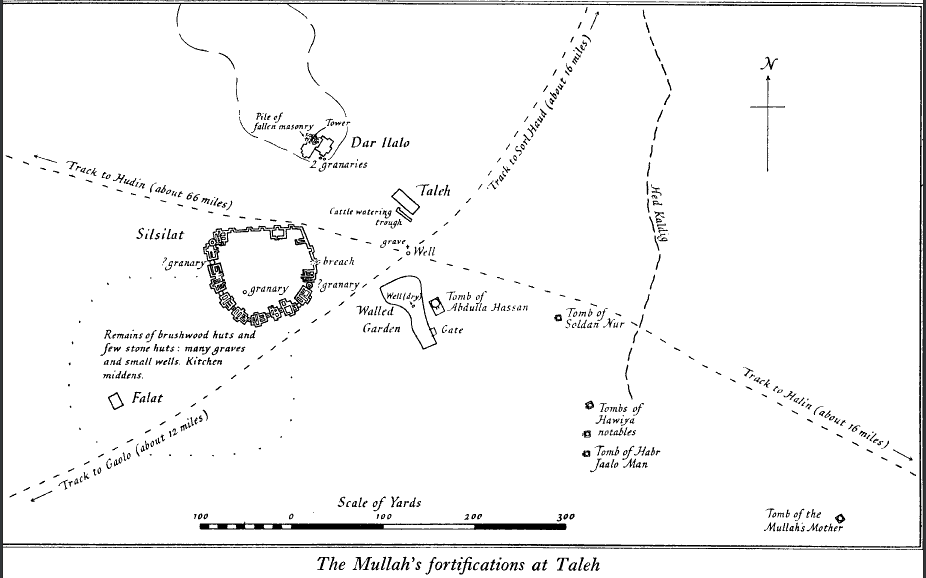
'The Mullah's fortifications at Taleh'.. The tombs of Mohammed Abdullah Hassan, Sultan Nur and unnamed Habr Je'lo ( Haji Osman Abdullah) and Hawiye notabales can be seen in the plan

Sultan Nur was buried by his dervish in a large, domed tomb in Taleh, his tomb predated the later dervish forts. His white tomb in the dervish capital is a testimony to his contribution to the movement. Only four dervish founders are commemorated in Taleh Nur included. William Archibald Macfadyen, a British geologist and the only scholar to study the structures of Taleh fort, mentioned the handful of tombs constructed by the dervish for their leaders and gave a detailed description of the tombs in 1931. In his article Macfayden only identified Sultan Nur's tomb by name out of the four dervish entombed in Taleh:

South of the main cave-well is the considerable tomb of 'Abdullah Hasan senior, well plastered inside and out; it is now said to be empty. Adjoining this on the west is a walled garden with massive gateway and guard-house; the rest of the wall is not more than 5 feet high and plastered. There are still odd bushes and signs of cultivation to be seen, but the comparatively deep well in the middle is dry. To the east lies a row of four tombs. The most northerly is that of one Soldan Nur of the Habr Yunis tribe; the next two, neither being plastered, and the first with the top left unfinished, are those of Hawiya notables whose names my Somalis did not know. The most southerly tomb is that of a man of the Habr Jaalo tribe. The isolated tomb still farther east is that of 'AbdullahHasan's mother. All the tombs are provided with narrow but very massive wooden doors, swinging about vertical extensions from top and base of one side.

== Modern Somali Dervish revisionism, 1974–1991 ==
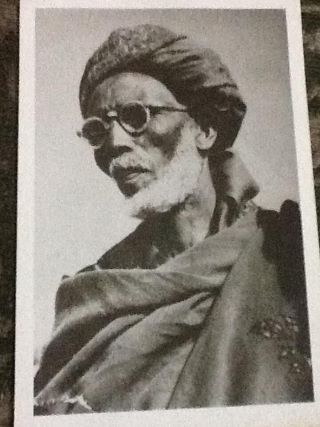
Cabdi dheere

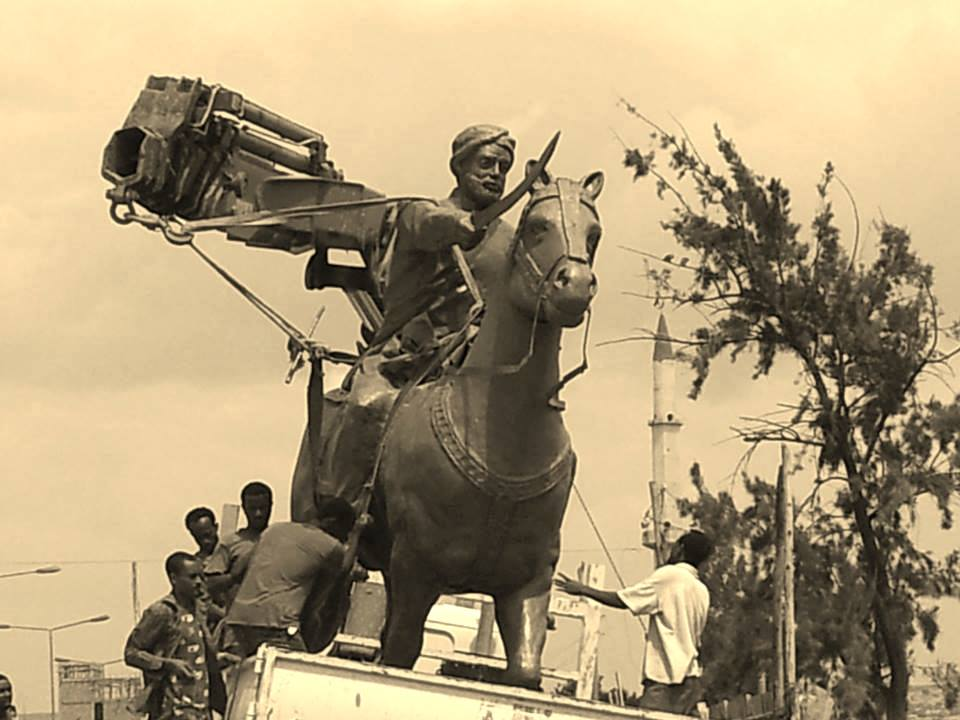
Statue of the Mad Mullah was removed from Mogadishu after the fall of the dictator Siad Bare

Despite such high regard by his dervish contemporaries, Sultan Nur and most of the non-Daarood dervishes were entirely expunged from Somali history. Aw Jama Umar Ise and his assistant Ahmed Farah Ali Idaja and the rest of the Somali Academy of Sciences and Arts. The Somali Academy of Sciences and Arts (Mogadishu, Somalia), a government institution, in 1976 printed the official Somali version of dervish history (Taariikhdii daraawiishta iyo Sayid Maxamad Cabdille Xasan, 1895–1920. 1976) by Aw Jama Umar Ise (Aw-Jama Omar Isse). In that official Somali account, Sultan Nur appears in but one sentence in the book.

Said S. Samatar in his book (Oral Poetry and Somali Nationalism: The Case of Sayid Mahammad 'Abdille Hasan. 2009), basically a translation of the official Somali version into English, passingly reduced the role of Sultan Nur in the dervish rebellion to one paragraph in which he claimed Mohammed Abdullah Hassan deposed Sultan Nur as the head of the Habr Yunis clan and replaced him with another sultan, a claim that he fails to substantiate by any citation. In other versions of his dissertations which later were published as a book, he claimed Sultan Nur used the influence of Mohammed Abdullah Hassan to outset his rival Madar Hersi.

Abdi Sheik Abdi, another Somali author of a book about the dervish (Divine madness: Moḥammed ʻAbdulle Ḥassan (1856–1920). 1993.), again essentially reduced the Dervish history into a clan narrative, where one side was in British lines and the other clan in dervish sides, further contributing to the single-clan-based dervish Somali narrative widely propagated by the late dictator Mohammed Siad Bare, where one clan was depicted as anti-colonial and nationalist while the rest, in particular the Isaaq (Sultan Nur's clan), was depicted as a British collaborators. Abdi Sheik Abdi minces no words in his book applying the word "collaborators" to the Isaaq and despite the majority of his Daarood clan's presence in the anti-dervish camp and British and Italian camp, he never uses such term to describe their position.

The late dictator himself Siad Barre believed in the clan-based narrative of the dervish, where the dervish story is reduced to a Daarood struggle against Great Britain, according to the former chief of the Somali police and the author of (The cost of dictatorship: the Somali experience) the Somali dictator believed that he was the new Mad Mullah incarnate and that the Isaaq were responsible for the defeat of his "hero" Mohammed Abdullah Hassan.

The Dervish historiography in Somali society was dominated by a one clan, virtually all of the Somali authors of the dervish, history and poetry hailed from Siad Barre's clan, with the exception of Musa Haji Ismail Galal. The clan used the state resources to turn Somali history into what Professor Ali Jimale Ahmed called a process of "dervishization" of Somali history to the exclusion of all others. This one-sided narrative dominated Somali media, school curriculum and even public discourse. During the civil war, Bashir Goeth, a Somali author from the Gedabursi clan which during the civil war was allied with Siad Barre clan against the Isaaq and SNM, called for the destruction of the what he called "Isaaq the troublesome child", in his article Goeth used the Dervish one-sided narrative to depict the Isaaq as "traitor"s. He opened his diatribe with the following paragraph:

... I will try to tackle the Isaaq threat to Somalism, starting from their stand on the Dervish Movement to the present situation in a historical perspective. I will not even go into details to include some of their terrorist activities such as hijacking a Somali ship in 1961 and a national carrier in 1966 and again in 1987. The Dervish Movement, led by Sayyid Mohamed Abdulle Hassan, started the first Somali patriotic struggle against the colonialists. This nationalist movement which entered a long and a bloody war with three foreign powers, namely the British, the Italians and the Ethiopian kingdom, would have been victorious if the Isaaq clan did not conspire against it with the British administration. The British government armed the Isaaq – the ‘friendlies’ as they were called (Lewis, I. M: The Modem History of Somaliland; Weidenfeld and Nicolson, London, 1965) – to fight against Sayyid Mohamed's nationalist movement. They also spied on and guided the British forces to the Dervish bases. The Isaaq had even sent several unsuccessful missions to Sayyid Mohamed Abdulle Hassan on the pretext of mediating between him and the British but each time they asked him to surrender. Sayyid Mohamed never yielded to the Isaaq games and even punished them on several occasions for their treachery and cooperation with the colonialists.

Dervish history was used and disseminated as clan propaganda and minor foot soldiers and latecomers into the dervish camps were elevated above the original founders of the movement and supplanted them all, thanks to the Siad Bare's government's overhaul of Dervish history. Ismail Mire (circa 1880s-1961) was promoted in the early years of Siad Bare's rule as the commander and lieutenant and right-hand man of the movement replacing Haji Sudi.

Preceded by Hersi Aman	Habr Yunis Sultanate	Succeeded by Madar Hersi

== See also ==
- Haji Sudi
- Abdallah Shihiri
- Sultan Deria Hassan
- Mohammed Abdullah Hassan
- Dervish state
- Sharmarke Ali Saleh
- Sheikh Madar
- Garhajis
- Isaaq
