= John William Carnegie Kirk =

John William Carnegie Kirk (1878–1962) was a British Army officer, and botanist working in South Africa and author of A British Garden Flora.

== Biography ==
Kirk was commissioned a second lieutenant in The Duke of Cornwall's Light Infantry on 18 October 1899, and promoted to lieutenant on 16 February 1901. In August 1902 he was seconded for service under the Foreign Office, and transferred to the 3rd (East Africa) Battalion of the King's African Rifles.

=== Geeraar for Sultan Nur ===
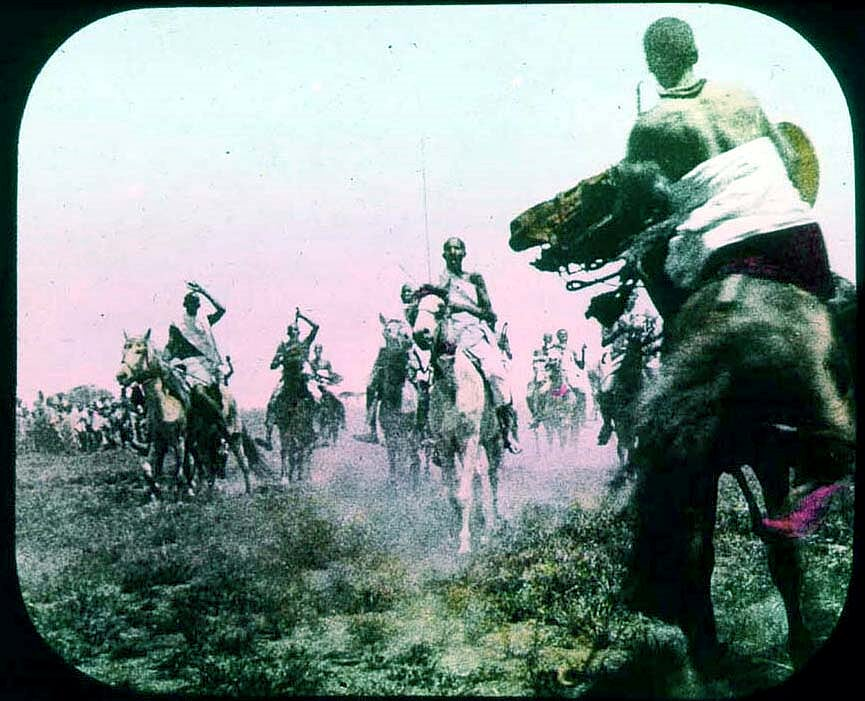
Sultan Nur (centre) and Habar Yunis horsemen

During his time in British Somaliland he recorded many poems and translated accounts and stories in the Somali language and compiled them into a book. One of such poems was about a visit from the powerful Sultan Nur Ahmed Aman to the Habr Je'lo. The Habr Je'lo recited this geeraar praising Sultan Nur.

Hali waa iga salaan
Halna wa iga sacab-qaad
Halna wa iga suaal
Hal wa i sacabqaad
wa i Suldaanka amaanti
Siraadki Berberad
iyo wa haldhaa subax joga
baalashi kala sidoo
wax la sisto la waa
Halna wa iga salan
Geela, Seenyo iyo Laan
Sangayaasha qararystay
Gabdhahaa suurta la moodo
iyo seyaxaanu ku jifna
Sadadaada nabad ba leh

—Habr Jelo Geeraar
Translation:

First we salute thee
Then we shake your hands
Then we ask a question
First is our handshake
is praise to our Sultan
the light of Berbera
Who is as an ostrich standing in the morning
Shaking out his wings
beyond compare
Again we salute thee
The camels, Senyo and Lan,
The stallions have become fat
The young girls are like straight sticks,
and we lie in the dew
the tribute is one of peace

== Works ==
A Grammar of the Somali Language: With Examples in Prose and Verse 1905
